= List of battles in the Spanish Civil War =

The Spanish Civil War was fought between July 17, 1936, and April 1, 1939, between the Second Spanish Republic and the Nationalist Rebels. Republicans tended to align with left-leaning political beliefs, and their faction consisted of Republicans, anarchist, liberals, communist, socialist, and separatist groups. The President of the Second Spanish Republic was the politician Manuel Azaña. In contrast, the Nationalist faction consisted of more right-leaning groups such as monarchists, traditionalists, conservatives, and Falangists. Their faction was led by a military junta, which came to be under the control of General Francisco Franco. The war began on July 17, 1936, with an attempted coup organized by generals in the Spanish Republican Armed Forces. The rebellion failed to overthrow the government quickly, however, the rebels gained control over large sections of the country. Their power bases were centered in the west and south of the country. The Republican government still maintained control over important cities such as Madrid. By 1937, the rebels had captured much of Spain's coastline and had laid siege to Madrid. They also conquered the remaining areas in the north. This sector of the war is known as the War in the North. Throughout 1938 the rebels marched to the east of the country, capturing Aragon and Catalonia. This cut off the Republican government from their primary source of supplies in Catalonia. By this point in the war, the Republicans had lost hundreds of thousands of men, and their morale was wavering. Colonel Segismundo Casado staged a coup against the government and hoped to take control and negotiate peace with the Nationalists. However, Franco rejected all offers. Franco had conquered Madrid on April 1, 1939, declaring victory. Afterward, Franco punished those who had associated with the Republican faction in a series of purges and executions known as the White Terror.

== Battles ==
| Battle | Date | Image | Description | Outcome |
|---|---|---|---|---|
| July 1936 military uprising in Melilla | July 17, 1936 – July 18, 1936 | | Francoist rebels in Melilla, a city in Spanish Morocco, overthrew the Republican government and seized control over the colony. | Nationalist Victory |
| Siege of the Montaña barracks | July 18, 1936 – July 20, 1936 | | Rebels attempted to stage a coup in Madrid. The majority of the soldiers in the city remained loyal and the rebellion was squashed. | Republican Victory |
| July 1936 military uprising in Barcelona | July 19, 1936 | | Officers of the Spanish army staged a coup in Barcelona. The Civil Guard, Assault Guard, the Mossos d’Esquadra, and Spanish Anarchists defeated the rebels. | Republican Victory |
| Siege of Gijón | July 19, 1936 – August 16, 1936 | | Spanish forces and Anarchist militia besieged a rebel garrison in Gijón. The defenders ran out of supplies and were forced to surrender. | Republican Victory |
| Siege of Oviedo | July 19, 1936 – October 17, 1936 | | Republican forces besieged rebel forces in Oviedo. The defenders resisted until a Nationalist relief force arrived. | Nationalist Victory |
| Siege of the Loyola barracks | July 19, 1936 – July 27, 1936 | | Soldiers in the Loyola barracks joined the uprising. Republican forces arrived and besieged the barracks. After a few days of fighting, the rebels surrendered. | Republican Victory |
| July 1936 coup d'état in Granada | July 20, 1936 – July 23, 1936 | | The garrison of Granada rebelled against the government. Workers, civilians, and soldiers still loyal to the Republican government held out in the neighborhood of Albaicín. After several days the Republicans surrendered. | Nationalist victory |
| Campaign of Gipuzkoa | July 20, 1936 – September 26, 1936 | | Nationialist forces invaded and captured the province of Gipuzkoa. | Nationalist Victory |
| Siege of the Alcázar | July 21, 1936 – September 27, 1936 | | Republican forces besieged the Alcázar. It is the former residence of the Spanish monarchs, and was of significant symbolic importance to the Nationalists. They viewed it a representation of Spanish dominance. The siege was lifted when a rebel relief force arrived repelling the loyalist army. | Nationalist Victory |
| Battle of Guadarrama | July 22, 1936 – September 15, 1936 | | Nationalist forces attempted to cross the Sierra de Guadarrama to reach Madrid from the north. The loyalist army repelled them. | Republican Victory |
| Extremadura campaign | August 2, 1936 – August 14, 1936 | | Nationalist forces conquered Extremadura. This connected the two disparate parts of the rebel territory in the south and west. | Nationalist Victory |
| Battle of Almendralejo | August 7, 1936 – August 15, 1936 | | Nationalist troops occupied the town of Almendralejo. Loyalist forces retreated, although 40 remained in the parish. The rebels besieged the remaining soldiers, and took the town. | Nationalist Victory |
| Battle of Sigüenza | August 7, 1936 - October 15, 1936 | | Sigüenza is captured by nationalist army. | Nationalist Victory |
| Battle of Mérida | August 10, 1936 – August 11, 1936 | | Nationalist forces conquerued Mérida and repelled Loyalist attempts to retake the city. | Nationalist Victory |
| Battle of Badajoz | August 11, 1936 – 14, 1936 | | Nationalist forces captured the city of Badajoz. Securing them control of Extremadura. | Nationalist Victory |
| Battle of Majorca | August 16, 1936 – September 12, 1936 | | Republican forces staged an amphibious landing of Mallorca in an attempt to reconquer it. Their assault was repelled by the rebels. | Nationalist Victory |
| Battle of the Sierra Guadalupe | August 17, 1936 – August 31, 1936 | | Nationalist forces captured several towns in the Sierra Guadalupe mountains | Nationalist Victory |
| Battle of Irún | August 19, 1936 – September 5, 1936 | | Nationalist forces captured the city of Irún, cutting off loyalist provinces from receiving French aid. | Nationalist Victory |
| Córdoba offensive | August 19, 1936- August 22, 1936 | | Nationalist forces repelled a failed Republic attempt to retake Córdoba | Nationalist Victory |
| Battle of Monte Pelado | August 28, 1936 | | Volunteers of the Matteotti Battalion defeated a Nationalist force at Monte Pelado. | Republican Victory |
| Battle of Talavera de la Reina | September 3, 1936 | | Nationalist forces conquerued the city of Talavera de la Reina. José Giral was forced to resign following the defeat. | Nationalist Victory |
| Battle of Cerro Muriano | September 5, 1936 | | Nationalist forces overwhelmed a Spanish Republican position at the village of Cerro Mariano in Andalusia. | Nationalist Victory |
| Siege of Santuario de Nuestra Señora de la Cabeza | September 4, 1936 – May 1, 1937 | | Rebel soldiers encamped at the shrine of Nuestra Señora de la Cabeza. Republican forces besieged and squashed the rebels. | Republican Victory |
| 1936 uprising in Spanish Guinea | September 19, 1936 - October, 1936 | | Nationalist forces staged a coup against the Republican governor of Spanish Guinea. Remaining Republican forces were driven out. | Nationalist Victory |
| Battle of Seseña | October 29, 1936 | | Republican forces armed with Soviet tanks launched a counteroffensive to stop the Nationalist advance on Madrid. Their assault fails, and the rebels continued their march. | Nationalist Victory |
| Villarreal Offensive | November 3, 1936 – December 24, 1936 | | Euzko Gudarostea besieged the town of Villarreal. Although Nationalist forces repelled their offensive, they secured some land in the nearby mountains. | Inconclusive |
| Siege of Madrid | November 8, 1936 – March 28, 1939 | | Nationalist forces besieged the city of Madrid. After a few years of fighting the city fell to the rebels. | Nationalist Victory |
| Battle of Ciudad Universitaria | November 15, 1936 – November 23, 1936 | | Republican forces halted the Nationalist advance on Madrid at the campus of the Ciudad Universitaria. | Republican Victory |
| First Battle of the Corunna Road | November 29, 1936 – December 3, 1936 | | Republican forces repelled a Nationalist attempt to cut off the Corunna Road. This prevented Madrid from being cut off from the west. | Republican Victory |
| Aceituna Campaign | December 13, 1936 – December 31, 1936 | | Nationalist forces launched a campaign to conquer Andújar. They defeated Republican forces but failed to occupy the city. | Inconclusive |
| Second Battle of the Corunna Road | December 13, 1936 – January 15, 1937 | | Nationalist forces successfully took the Corunna Road. Although Republican forces successfully prevented the encirclement of Madrid. | Republican Victory |
| Battle of Lopera | December 27, 1936 – December 29, 1936 | | Republican forces launched an assault on the town of Lopera. Their assault is repelled by the Nationalists. | Nationalist Victory |
| Third Battle of the Corunna Road | January 1937 | | Nationalist forces conquerued more land along the Corunna Road. However, Republican forces maintained control of the countryside, preventing the rebels from encircling Madrid. | Inconclusive |
| Battle of Málaga | February 3, 1937– February 8, 1937 | | Nationalist and Italian forces routed a Republican army and captured Málaga. | Nationalist Victory |
| Los Blázquez Offensive | | | Nationalist forces launch an offensive as part of their assault on Málaga. | |
| Battle of Jarama | February 6, 1937 – February 27, 1937 | | Nationalist forces attempted to dislodge the Republicans at the Jarama river. Republican forces were pushed back, although no breakthrough was made. Following the initial assault there was a series of failed Republican counteroffensives. | Inconclusive |
| Battle of Cape Machichaco | March 5, 1937 | | One Nationalist cruiser attacked a Republican convoy guarded by four trawlers. One trawler was sunk, two were damaged, and the convoy was captured. | Nationalist Victory |
| Battle of Pozoblanco | March 6, 1937- April 16, 1937 | | Republican troops repelled a Nationalist effort to capture Pozoblanco. | Republican Victory |
| Battle of Guadalajara | March 8, 1937– 23, 1937 | | Nationalist and Italian forces attempted to encircle Madrid. The Republican forces successfully pushed the rebels back and launched a successful counteroffensive. | Republican Victory |
| War in the North | March 31, 1937 – October 21, 1937 | | Nationalist forces conquered all the land in northern Spain that remained loyal to the Republic. | Nationalist Victory |
| Biscay Campaign | March 31, 1937 – July 1, 1937 | | Nationalist forces occupied the province of Biscay and captured the city of Bilbao. | Nationalist Victory |
| Segovia Offensive | May 31, 1937 - June 6, 1937 | | Republican forces launched an offensive to capture Segovia. This was intended to divert the rebel armies marching on Bilbao. The offensive failed due to a lack of air support. | Nationalist Victory |
| Battle of Bilbao | June 12, 1937 – June 19, 1937 | | Nationalist forces captured Bilbao and all of the remaining territory in the Basque Country. | Nationalist Victory |
| Huesca Offensive | June 12, 1937 - June 19, 1937 | | Republican troops launched an offensive to capture Huesca. The rebels successfully repelled the assault. | Nationalist Victory |
| Battle of Albarracín | July 5, 1937– August 11, 1937 | | Republican forces assaulted the city of Albarracín. They experienced short term success, forcing the rebels to take defensive positioning. However, the Nationalists soon launched a counterattack repelling the Republicans from the area. | Nationalist Victory |
| Battle of Brunete | July 6, 1937 – July 25, 1937 | | Republican troops launched an offensive on Brunete to alleviate rebel pressure on Madrid. They gain 24 kilometers of territory during the earlier part of the battle. The Nationalists organized a counterattack and forced the Republicans to retreat. | Inconclusive |
| Battle of Santander | August 14, 1937 – 17 September 1937 | | Nationalist forces launched an offensive to conquer the province of Santander, which is now Cantabria. Their assault was successful, they captured the land and inflicted catastrophic losses on the Republicans. | Nationalist Victory |
| Zaragoza Offensive | August 24, 1937 – September 7, 1937 | | Republican forces launched an offensive to retake Zaragosa. They failed to retake the city, however they captured Belchite. | Inconclusive |
| Battle of Belchite | August 24, 1937 – September 7, 1937 | | The Republicans retook Belchite and surrounding towns as part of the Zaragoza Offensive. Afterwards, the Nationalists launched a counteroffensive to try and recapture the city. However the Republican lines held firm. | Republican Victory |
| Asturias Offensive | September 1, 1937 – October 21, 1937 | | The Nationalists launched an offensive to capture Asturias. They successfully took the land, ending the War in the North. | Nationalist Victory |
| Battle of El Mazucu | September 6, 1937 – September 22, 1937 | | Republican forces protecting El Mazucu temporarily halted the Nationalist offensive in Asturias. After eight weeks of fighting, the rebels overwhelmed the defenders. | Nationalist Victory |
| Battle of Cape Cherchell | September 7, 1937 | | One Nationalist heavy cruiser unexpectedly encountered two Republican naval light cruisers guarding a convoy. The warships engaged in battle, and the Republican convoy was lost. | Nationalist Victory |
| Battle of Sabiñánigo | September 22, 1937 – November 8, 1937 | | Republican forces attempted to capture Sabiñánigo. They encircled the city, but failed to occupy it. However, they retook Biescas. | Republican Victory |
| Battle of Teruel | December 15, 1937 – February 22, 1938 | | Republican and Nationalist forces fought of the city of Teruel. Republican forces initially occupied the city. However the rebels used their superior equipment and manpower to recapture the area. | Nationalist Victory |
| Battle of Alfambra | February 5, 1938 - February 7, 1938 | | Nationalist forces launched an offensive as part of the Battle of Teruel to rake the city. They broke through Republican lines at Alfambra, took thousands of prisoners, and threatened the Republican position in Teruel. | Nationalist Victory |
| Battle of Cape Palos | March 5, 1938 – March 6, 1938 | | Republican and Nationalist naval forces engaged each other at Cape Palos. During the battle, the Nationalist cruiser Baleares was sunk. | Republican Victory |
| Aragon Offensive | March 7, 1938 – April 19, 1938 | | After retaking Teruel the Nationalists launched an offensive on Aragon. They took control over the province and conquered land in Catalonia and the Levante. | Nationalist Victory |
| Battle of Caspe | March 16, 1938 – March 17, 1938 | | Nationalist forces defeated a Republican garrison in Caspe, conquering the town. | Nationalist Victory |
| Battle of Lérida | March 27, 1938 – April 3, 1938 | | | |
| Battle of Gandesa | April 1, 1938 - April 3, 1938 | | After conquering Caspe Nationalist forces marched on Gandesa, capturing the town. | Nationalist Victory |
| Battle of the Segre | April 4, 1938 – January 3, 1939 | | Republican forces were pushed back to the Segre river following the loss of Aragon. Nationalist forces launched an assault on the area. They were met with a line of heavily fortified Republican defensive positions. After months of fighting, the Nationalists broke through the Republican lines. | Nationalist Victory |
| Battle of Biesla pocket | April 14, 1938 – June 16, 1938 | | Republican soldiers in Bielsa were encircled after the fall of Aragon. They successfully escaped and crossed the border to France. Nationalist forces captured the town of Bielsa afterwards. | Nationalist Victory |
| Levante Offensive | April 25, 1938 – July 24, 1938 | | Nationalist forces launched an offensive to capture Valencia. They conquered the province of Castellón, however failed to take Valencia. | Republican Victory |
| Balaguer Offensive | April 1938 - May, 1938 | | Republican forces launched a series of failed counter offensives after losing Aragon. | Nationalist Victory |
| Battle of the Merida pocket | July 20, 1938 - July 24, 1938 | | Nationalist forces launched a successful offensive to capture Mérida. | Nationalist Victory |
| Battle of the Ebro | July 25, 1938 – November 16, 1938 | | The Republicans launched an offensive across the Ebro river to halt the Nationalist offensive. They expended much of their resources and manpower, but failed to halt the Nationalist assault. In the ensuing rebel counteroffensive, they retook some of the land the Republicans had conquered. | Nationalist Victory |
| Siege of Gandesa | July 31, 1938 – November 2, 1938 | | Nationalist forces repelled an attempt by Republican troops to capture Gandesa. | Nationalist Victory |
| Catalonia Offensive | December 23, 1938 – February 10, 1939 | | Nationalist forces launched an offensive, successfully conquering all of Catalonia and Barcelona. | Nationalist Victory |
| Battle of Valsequillo | January 5, 1939 – February 4, 1939 | | Republican forces launched an offensive on Sierra Morena to divert Nationalist forces in Catalonia. They retook 500 kilometers of land, but the Nationalists soon launched a counteroffensive retaking all the lost territory. | Nationalist Victory |
| Battle of Minorca | February 7, 1939 – February 9, 1939 | | Nationalist forces captured the island of Menorca. | Nationalist Victory |
| Cartagena uprising | March 4, 1939 – March 7, 1939 | | Republican troops in Cartagena rebelled against the Republican government. Loyal Republican forces were tasked with squashing the revolt, which they soon accomplished. Nationalist forces were sent to aid the disloyal Republicans, however by the time they arrived the Rebellion was crushed. One Nationalist ship was sunk. | Republican Victory |
| Final offensive of the Spanish Civil War | March 26, 1939 – April 1, 1939 | | Republican forces overthrew the government and established a military Junta. This new government attempted to negotiate peace with the Nationalists, however the rebels were only interested in an unconditional surrender. They launched an offensive and took control over all the remaining land in Spain. | Nationalist Victory |
