= Tommy Wood (International Brigades) =

Irish volunteer in the Spanish Civil War

- Born: Thomas Wood c. 1919
- Died: December 1936; Battle of Lopera, Andalusia
- Cause of death: Battlefield injuries
- Burial place: Andújar Cemetery
- Other name: Bernard
- Relatives: Patrick Doyle; Séan Doyle
- Military career
- Allegiance: Irish Republican Army; Second Spanish Republic
- Branch: International Brigades
- Service years: 1936
- Rank: Volunteer
- Unit: Connolly Column
- Conflicts: Battle of Lopera

Tommy or Thomas Wood (Note: Sometimes misnamed Woods.) (c. 1919 – 1936) was an Irish volunteer who joined the International Brigades, fighting on the side of the Spanish Republic during the civil war against General Franco's Nationalists. Wood came from a Dublin family which had a strong tradition of Irish Republicanism, and he had lost two uncles in the Irish War of Independence.

Following Wood's arrival in Spain, just before Christmas 1936, his unit was despatched south to Córdoba, where they built a bridgehead. The fighting was bitter, however, and little progress was made, particularly due to air attacks from Nationalist forces. During the assault on nearby Lopera, Wood was wounded. It is uncertain whether he died immediately or in hospital, and it took some time for news of his death to be received in Ireland.

== Early life ==
Little is known of Wood's early life, but his father was John Wood, who worked for the Department of Local Government, and his mother was Sarah, née Doyle. He had siblings. Wood's precise date of birth has gone unrecorded, but his parents' letter to the External Affairs Department states he was 17 in 1936. (Note: The only other 17-year olds to have joined up were the black radical Charlie Hutchison and Ronnie Burghes, Charlotte Haldane's son, both from London.) He grew up at 16 Buckingham Place in the north of Dublin's inner city. Wood's family had a "respected" history of Irish Republicanism: two maternal uncles died fighting British forces. Patrick Doyle had been executed by at Mountjoy Gaol in 1921, during the Irish War of Independence, and another, Séan Doyle was killed in an action at The Custom House the same year. Wood joined the IRA's youth organisation, Fianna Éireann, as a youth. Wood was one of at least three active members of the Fianna who joined the International Brigade—known as International Brigaders or brigadistas—another of whom, along with Wood, was also to die on active service.

== Spanish Civil War ==
The Spanish Civil War had broken out in July 1936 after a failed right-wing coup against the elected left-leaning Popular Front government of the Second Spanish Republic. Supported by the Fascist governments of Germany and Italy, the Nationalist Army was commanded by General Franco. Republican government forces were supported by the Soviet Union as well as thousands of citizens from non-interventionist countries. The volunteers mostly joined the International Brigades. The Irish section, known as the Connolly Column, began leaving for Spain in November 1936. One of its chief recruiters was Frank Ryan.

By the time Wood left for Spain, he was in the Dublin 2nd Battalion, the unit reserved for members who were 16 or over and ready to graduate into the IRA itself. According to the obituary subsequently run in the Irish Democrat, he wrote to his mother before leaving, explaining his reasons as "going to fight for the working class. It is not a religious war, that is all propaganda." It is possible that Wood lied about his age in order to join up; the Irish Democrat later reported that he had been "a mere boy who added years to his real age in order to get to Spain". The Party also rejected volunteers for service on the grounds of youth. (Note: Historian Fearghal McGarry notes that the CPI vetted new recruits' suitability on the grounds of "physical or mental condition, political unsuitability, as well as the importance to the party", as well as age: Bob Doyle was rejected at the age of 21.)

Ryan's group mostly comprised ex-IRA men and organised under the name Connolly Column. Wood had been attached to the recently formed XIV International Brigade at Albacete, and was almost immediately despatched—on 24 December—to the Córdoba area as part of the Aceituna Campaign. (Note: Not to be confused with the Battle of Córdoba itself, which had taken place between 19 and 22 August earlier the same year.) A fellow of Wood's, Joe Monks, described their departure for the front on Christmas Eve: "The people turned out to wish us bon voyage; the little girls kissed us. Their mothers cried for us because in their eyes, most of us were but boys." On 26 December Wood's unit created a bridgehead at Lopera. However, heavy enemy airfare prevented an all-out assault on the Nationalist lines.

== Death ==
The brigade's attempted offensive in Lopera, comments the historian R. Dan Richardson, "received a baptism of fire [which] turned into a thorough debacle". Including Wood, eight Irishmen were to die as a result of the fighting. Of these, six of these—including Wood—had crossed the Pyrenees with Ryan. Wood was either killed outright on Boxing Day (26 December), as The Worker reported or died five days later in Andújar Hospital following injuries sustained during the battle. He had been gone from Ireland 18 days. He was buried in Andújar Cemetery.

On 15 February Joseph Walshe, Secretary of the Irish Free State's Foreign Affairs Department wrote to the Irish Plenipotentiary in Spain, Leopold H. Kerney, advising him that Wood had "secretly" joined Ryan's group and departed for Spain on 11 December 1936. (Note: In the same letter, Walshe advises that "representations have been received in the Department from the parents of four boys under 21 years of age". The boys had joined the pro-nationalist and pro-Catholic Irish Brigade under Eoin O'Duffy and were by then in Spain.) Kerney was requested to contact the republican Spanish Government Authorities and seek Wood's return on account of his being a legal minor still. Kerney was unable to establish Wood's movements, however.

News of his death did not reach Ireland until 1937, and early reports were confused. In his autobiography, the political commissar of the column Michael O'Riordan, reported that on 21 January, Ryan wrote that Wood had been wounded but did not list him among the dead. On 6 February, Ryan wrote to the Irish Communist Party's paper, The Worker, (Note: Historian Pete Jackson has described The Worker as "a small, duplicated, four-page weekly bulletin ... Costing one penny and edited by Sean Murray, the General Secretary of the CPI, the Worker was a shoestring operation published from 32 Lower Ormond Quay, and ran for only thirty-six issues from 11 July 1936 to 13 March 1937".) that Wood had been "slightly wounded and [was] progressing favourably". It was believed Wood was suffering from shell shock as the result of an air raid, but alive. However, ten days later, the Irish Democrat carried an obituary with a message from Ryan. In it, they state that Ryan wrote to Wood's parents and said he was wounded above the left knee and required hospital treatment. He was carried off the field by the English communist and historian Ralph Winston Fox and ex-British soldier and Auxiliary George Nathan, (Note: Both Fox and Nathan died during the Civil War, the former at Lopera on the same day as Wood and the latter at the Battle of Brunete the following year.) but after being collected by stretcher bearers, he was hit again, this time in the head. Throughout this, he remained conscious, said Ryan, before dying on 29 December. Ryan suggested the late arrival of news was the result of a local confusion with the surname 'Wools', which was the name of a Dutch volunteer in the same hospital at the time.

== In culture ==
The Irish folk and rebel music singer and songwriter Christy Moore wrote a song in 1983 while on holiday in Spain, which he titled 'Viva la Quinta Brigada'. A condensed story of Ireland's involvement in the Spanish Civil War, Moore says in his autobiography that he was influenced by reading O'Riordan's mémoire of the fight in Spain, The Connolly Column, subsequently noting that he "began this song as I read on. The song was lifted entirely from his book." Moore devotes a verse to Tommy Woods [sic], which reads:

Tommy Woods age seventeen died in Cordoba

With Na Fianna he learned to hold his gun

From Dublin to the Villa del Río

Where he fought and died beneath the blazing sun

In a 1961 interview with Sylvère Lotringer, the Irish writer Brendan Behan claimed Wood as a friend of his (albeit "two years older than myself when he went away"). Fellow brigadista Monks—also from Dublin and a friend of Seán O'Casey—later spoke to the John Cornford Poetry Group and described his memories of Wood at Lopera. On Christmas day night, their unit was "eyeball to eyeball" with fascists; Cornford kept his comrades amused, and Wood enjoyed himself.

== See also ==
- International Brigade Memorial Trust
