= John O'Reilly (soldier) =

Irish soldier (1908-1986)

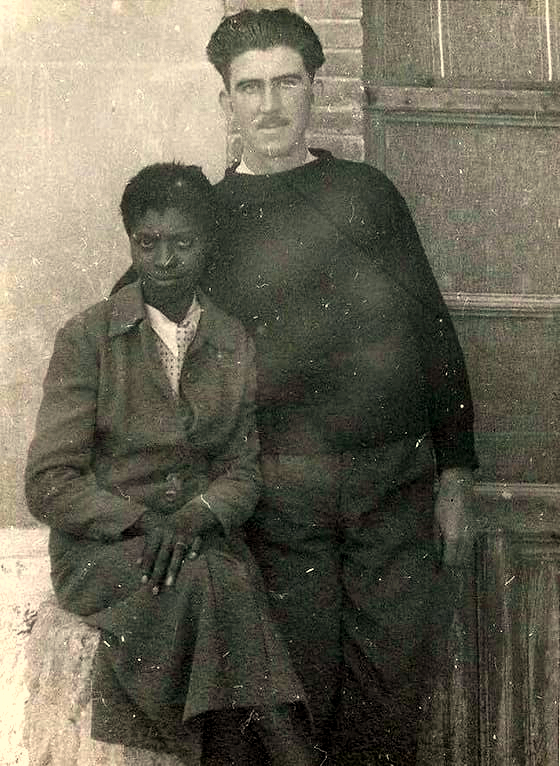
- John O'Reilly with his wife Salaria Kea circa 1938
- Born: 29 March 1908; Thurles, County Tipperary, Ireland
- Died: 31 December 1986 (aged 78); Akron, Ohio
- Spouse: Salaria Kea (m. 1937)
- Military career
- Allegiance: United Kingdom; Republican Spain; United States
- Branch: British Army; International Brigades; US Army
- Service years: 1928–1931; 1936–1938; 1943–1945
- Nickname: Pat
- Units: Irish Guards; British Battalion; 82nd Engineer Combat Regiment
- Conflicts: Spanish Civil War; Battle of Lopera; Second Battle of the Corunna Road; Battle of Jarama; World War II; Western Front; Invasion of Normandy; Allied advance from Paris to the Rhine; Battle of the Bulge; Western Allied invasion of Germany

John O’Reilly (29 March 1908 – 31 December 1986) was an Irish soldier who fought in the Spanish Civil War on the Republican side and in World War II as part the British Army. During the Spanish Civil War, he met and married Salaria Kea, an African-American nurse, who was also volunteering her services.

== Early life ==
John O'Reilly was born in Thurles, County Tipperary, Ireland in 1908, the third of four sons. His father fought as part of the Royal Irish Regiment of the British Army during World War I. O'Reilly describes his childhood as one of poverty and boredom in rural Ireland. At the age of 14, O'Reilly moved in with his recently widowed aunt on the Tipperary/Waterford border to work her farm, with the expectation he would eventually inherit the property, but O'Reilly came to find that lifestyle "stultifying". O'Reilly claimed later in life he was a member of the Anti-Treaty IRA from 1922 onwards, however, he would have only been 14 years old at this point.

At the age of 20, O'Reilly emigrated to England to search for work. He soon joined the Irish Guards regiment of the British Army. O'Reilly served 3 years of a 7-year term before deserting. By now it was 1931 and the onset on the Great Depression. O'Reilly spent the next years traveling between England and Ireland working as a bricklayer and as a tannery worker. In 1934 he joined the Irish Transport and General Workers Union following a push for members in his hometown of Thurles.

In 1936, O'Reilly left Ireland, never to return.

== Spanish Civil War ==
The flag of the International Brigades, which O'Reilly fought as part of

By 1936, O'Reilly was working and living in Oxford, England at a brickyard. While there, O'Reilly began attending meetings at Oxford University, particularly ones relating to Spain. Soon, O'Reilly saw a newspaper advertisement requesting volunteers to go and fight on behalf of the government/republicans in the now-begun Spanish Civil War. O'Reilly, armed with his previous military experience, seems to have departed England for Spain in December 1936. Explaining his motive for fighting later in life, O'Reilly stated "I thought there was going to be a war and if I was going to be killed anyway, it would be better to be fighting for the poor than for the rich".

=== Battle of Lopera ===
Upon his arrival, O'Reilly was attached to an English-speaking battalion of the Sixth of February Battalion of the XIV International Brigade. Of the 145 volunteers in his company, 42 others besides O'Reilly were Irish. On Christmas Eve 1936, O'Reilly battalion sent out to join the front around Córdoba. O'Reilly's commanding officers were George Nathan and Kit Conway; Nathan was controversial amongst the Irish volunteers who became aware that Nathan had previously served as a member of the Black and Tans during the Irish War of Independence. O'Reilly's unit took part in the Battle of Lopera but were defeated. Seven Irish volunteers died at Lopera and many were wounded. Overall, approximately 300 members of the battalion died and approximately another 600 were wounded. In a 1975 interview, O'Reilly described that a French volunteer officer named LaSalle was executed for treason after the battle by the republican leadership. O'Reilly complained that this paranoid behaviour set the tone for the rest of the war, and that unlike the formal discipline he had previously experienced in the British army, the republican army was plagued by chaos and infighting: "Because we had lost, that charge was made that he led us into a trap. Anytime anything went wrong, somebody would charge it was sabotage. This kind of suspicion was a problem throughout the war". O'Reilly opined that republican officers were not selected for merit, but "because they happened to be members of some political organisation".

=== Second Battle of the Corunna Road ===
On 11 January 1937 O'Reilly's company was redeployed to Madrid to take part in the Second Battle of the Corunna Road, which involved thousands of troops from both the republican and nationalist sides. O'Reilly's company was tasked with retaking the suburban village of Las Rozas. The mission ended in failure when the republicans found that their opponents had superior weapons. In the aftermath, only 67 of the company's original 145 volunteers returned to the International Brigade base at Albacete.

While O'Reilly's company had been on the frontline, a new company had been forming within the XV International Brigade; the British Battalion. However, many Irish volunteers had split off from this unit to form their own; the Connolly Column which attached itself to the American Lincoln Battalion. O'Reilly choose to stay with the British Battalion. Survivors of earlier engagements were kept in reserve and thus O'Reilly was assigned Quartermaster of the British cookhouse, a role that quickly left him disillusioned with his choice.

=== Battle of Jarama ===
As the Battle of Jarama commenced in February 1937, O'Reilly offered to work as an ambulance guard at Morata de Jalón close to the battlefront. For three months, O'Reilly worked transporting troops from the frontline back to the hospitals in the area. It was during this time, while working in and around American No.1 Base Hospital at Villa Paz, that O'Reilly encountered the new head nurse Salaria Kea who had just arrived from New York City.

=== Medical service and meeting Salaria Kea ===
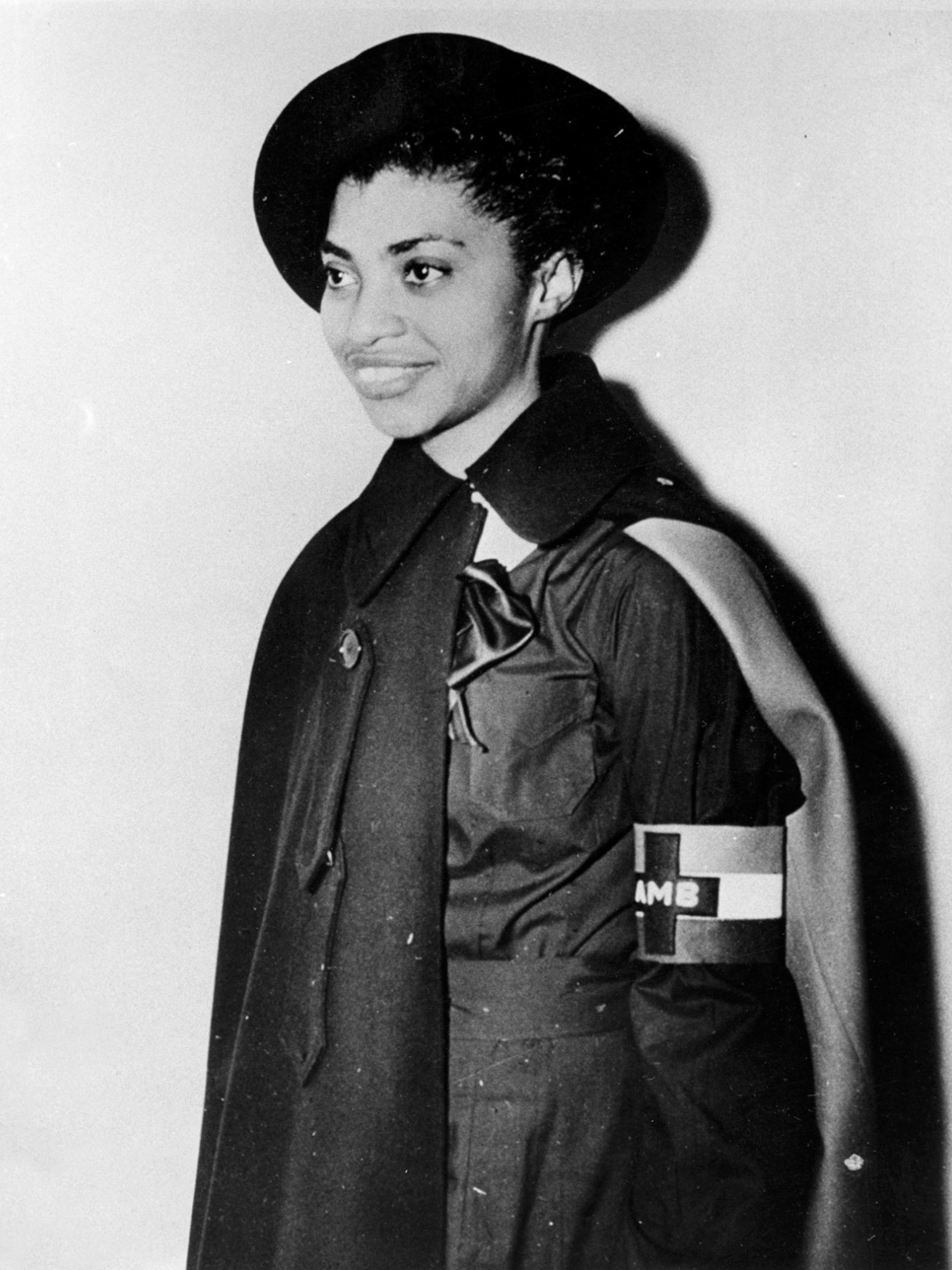
Salaria Kea in March 1937

Over the course of the spring of 1937, O'Reilly quietly developed a romantic crush on Kea. O'Reilly, who had become quiet and withdrawn, had taken to writing poetry alone in his room in the hospital. One of the other nurses took an interest in this, and began prying at the poetry. She quickly released that O'Reilly's poetry mainly revolved around Kea, and soon began encouraging Kea to interact with O'Reilly. Kea, an African-American originally from Ohio, was initially reluctant to begin courting a white man, however, O'Reilly soon made a plead to Kea: "Would you let the reactionaries take away the only thing a poor man deserved and that thing is his right to marry the one he loved and believed loved him?". After a summer courtship, O'Reilly and Kea married in October 1937.

O'Reilly and Kea continued to serve the Republican forces in the Civil war, providing medical services. After the wedding, Kea served during the Battle of Teruel; during the republican retreat, she briefly became detached from her unit and was later temporarily jailed by republican police fearing betrayal. In March 1938, the hospital at Villa Paz was evacuated and staff were transferred to Vic, a large convalescent hospital 45 miles north of Barcelona.

Within weeks of the relocation, Kea alongside many other medical staff were sent back to the United States as they suffered from Post-traumatic stress disorder. O'Reilly remained working at Vic but the conditions became worse and worse. The hospital became overcrowded and in September 1938 there was an outbreak of typhoid which dedicated patients and staff alike. O'Reilly was forced to leave Spain for England the next month in October 1938, with the help of the Irish Legation in Paris. Upon O'Reilly's arrival at Victoria Station in London he was immediately hospitalised for three weeks. Thereafter he spent some time living in a refugee camp in Surrey. During this period O'Reilly sent a letter home to his father, explained he felt he could not return to Ireland with his new wife without them facing discrimination.

== Immigrating to America ==
Having both returned home, both O'Reilly and Kea sought to reunite in the United States. However, the process was long and O'Reilly found it difficult to obtain a visa. Even the American Embassy in London told him he was unlikely to succeed. However, back in New York Kea was able to return to her position as head nurse at Harlem Hospital, which strengthened their case. Kea also directly wrote to the President of the United States, Franklin Roosevelt, for assistance, and some seemed to be forthcoming. O'Reilly was granted a visa and rejoined Kea in New York on 22 August 1940. Once there, Reilly was able to find work with the Interborough Rapid Transit Company (IRT). Under Irish republican and socialist organiser "Red" Mike Quill, the IRT was popularly known as the "Irish Republican Transit" Company because so many Irish republican exiles worked there.

== World War II ==
In early 1943, O'Reilly was drafted into the 82nd Engineer Combat Regiment of the US Army at age 35. The unit received training at Camp Swift in Texas before being shipped to North Africa in November 1943, and from there to Frome in Somerset, England, where they were kept in waiting for D-Day. 10 days after the landing at Omaha Beach, the 82nd deployed into Normandy. Over the next 11 months, O'Reilly and the 82 would support the allied advance into France towards Paris, from there on towards Northern France and Belgium. In December 1944 they participated in the Battle of the Bulge as frontline infantry. By April 1945 the 82nd had pierced all the way to Magdeburg in Germany, just 95 miles from Berlin. On 5 May 1945, victory was declared in Europe and O'Reilly was sent home.

== Later life ==
The Second war powers act of 1942 made it much easier for non-citizens who served in the American military to obtain citizenship after their service had ended. Because of this, O'Reilly was able to obtain American citizenship while still overseas; O'Reilly received his Certificate of Naturalization while in Paris on 28 May 1945.

O'Reilly and Kea reunited in New York after the war. They met immediately tragedy when their first and only child died during pregnancy in 1946, and afterwards, Kea was unable to conceive again. Additionally, O'Reilly and Kea were occasionally harassed by the FBI because of their involvement in the Spanish Civil War, fearing that they were communists. Nevertheless, Kea became a nursing tutor while O'Reilly became a Transport Police officer.

Mindful of reactions to their interracial marriage, O'Reilly and Kea lived in a Jewish neighbourhood until the mid-1950s, before moving to Grace Avenue in the Bronx. However, once there, they were pressured to move away by neighbours. In 1973 they moved to Akron, Ohio where much of Kea's family had settled. While they enjoyed the comfort of Kea's family, they also experienced harassment from the Ku Klux Klan on Sunday after they attended Catholic Mass together.

From the late 1970s onwards, Kea began to experience mental health issues and memory issues that would later be diagnosed with Alzheimer's. O'Reilly cared for her until his death in 1986. Kea died four years later on 18 May 1990. They were buried together in Glendale Cemetery, Akron.
