= No Other Way =

Short Biographies

No Other Way: Oxfordshire and the Spanish Civil War 1936-39
- Authors: Chris Farman, Valery Rose, Liz Woolley
- Language: English
- Subjects: Spanish Civil War
- Genres: History, Biography
- Publisher: International Brigade Memorial Trust
- Publication date: 2015
- Media type: Paperback book
- Pages: 124
- ISBN: 978 1 910448 05 2

No Other Way: Oxfordshire and the Spanish Civil War 1936-39 is a collection of short biographies detailing the lives of people from Oxfordshire, England, who fought against fascism during the Spanish Civil War. This book was the first ever attempt by historians to identify all the known volunteers with links to Oxfordshire who fought in the war, and was created through a collaboration between local Oxford historians and the International Brigade Memorial Trust (IBMT). The title "No Other Way" is a reference to a quote by Cecil Day-Lewis.

The forward contains an introduction to the Spanish Civil War written by Oxford University professor Tom Buchanan.

== Creation and memorial ==
The creation and sale of the book was used by the IBMT to raise funds for the first Spanish Civil War memorial in Oxfordshire. This campaign was a success partially thanks to the No Other Way book sales. The memorial was raised in 2017 with the erection of the Oxford Spanish Civil War memorial in South Park, Oxford.

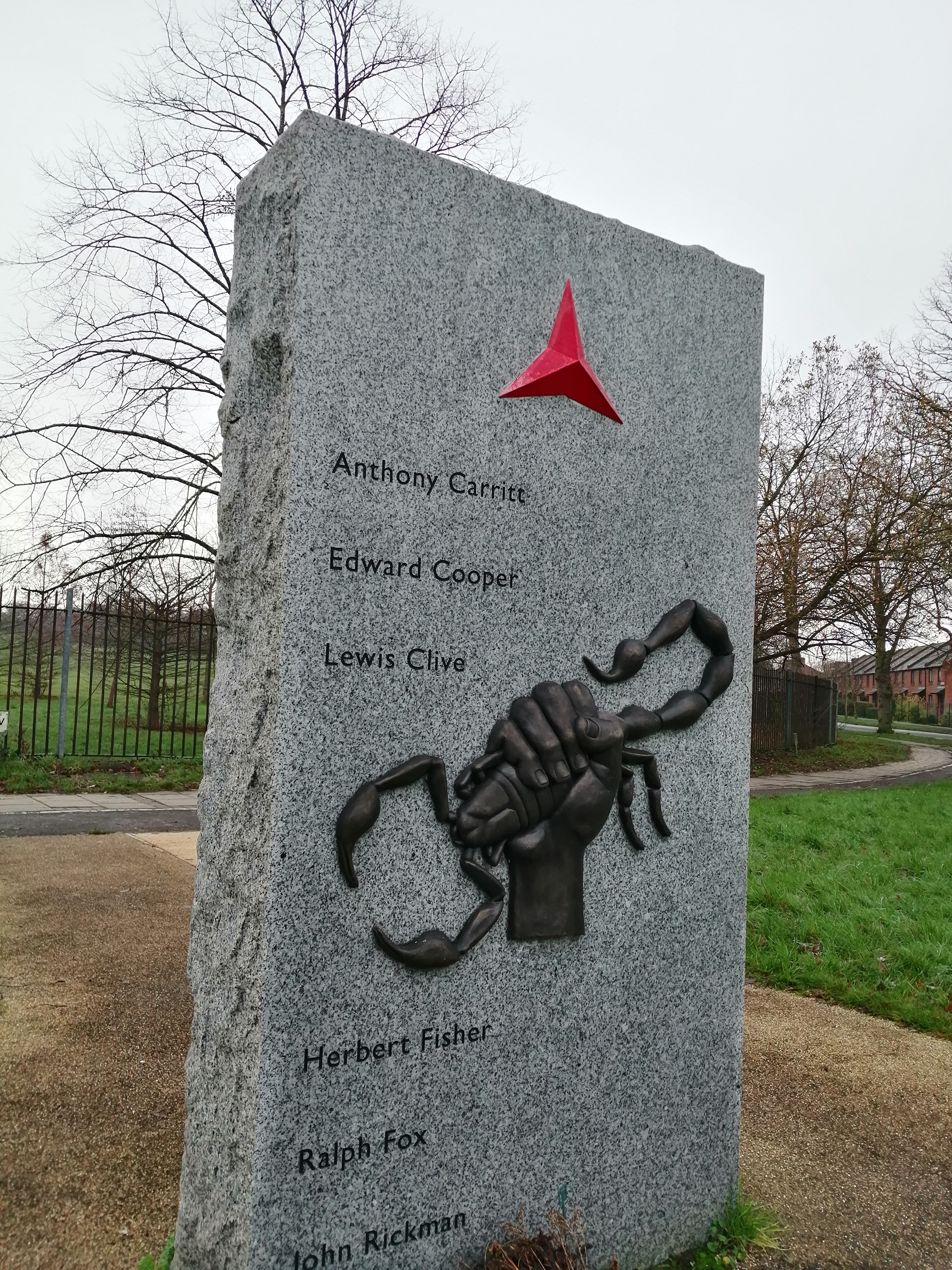
The Oxford Spanish Civil War memorial, created partially using funds raised from the sale of No Other Way

== Reception ==
No Other Way received generally positive reviews.

Graham Stevenson, a British trade union leader and author on the history of communist activism in Britain, gave a positive review.

Professor of history at the Lancaster University Ben Edwards gave a positive review, although he lamented the fact that more references to the existing literature could have improved the work.

Peter Hill of the Oxford Left Review wrote a review detailing the ways in which the book's contents can be linked to modern Oxford.

== Known volunteers ==
No Other Way identified 31 individual people with links to Oxfordshire, England, who fought against fascism during the Spanish Civil War.

- Alfred Smith
- Alec Wainman
- Anthony Carritt
- Carl Marzani
- Christopher Thornycroft
- Claud Cockburn
- Dorothy Collier
- Edward Henry Burke Cooper
- Gavin Henderson, 2nd Baron Faringdon
- George Orwell
- Giles Romilly
- Herbert Fisher
- James (Jim) Brewer
- John (Jock) Birrell
- John Montgomery
- John Rickman
- Kathleen McColgan
- Lewis Clive
- Michael (Mike) Wilton
- Murray Fuhrman
- Nathan Clark
- Noel Carritt
- Peter Ferguson
- Peter Harrisson
- Philip Norman
- Ralph Winston Fox
- Robert Wheeler
- Thora Silverthorne
- Tom Wintringham
- Victor Claridge
- Wogan Philipps, 2nd Baron Milford

== Missing biographies ==
Despite attempts by the writers to include every known volunteer, historians have since discovered two more volunteers who were previously undiscovered. Their names are:

- Charlie Hutchison - The only known Black-British man to have fought in the Spanish Civil War.
- Liesel Carritt - A German-Jewish refugee who had fled to Oxford with her family to escape the Nazis.

In recognition of this mistake, a correction was included on the website of the local Oxford branch of the International Brigades Memorial Trust.
