= George Nathan =

British International Brigade volunteer

Samuel George Montague Nathan
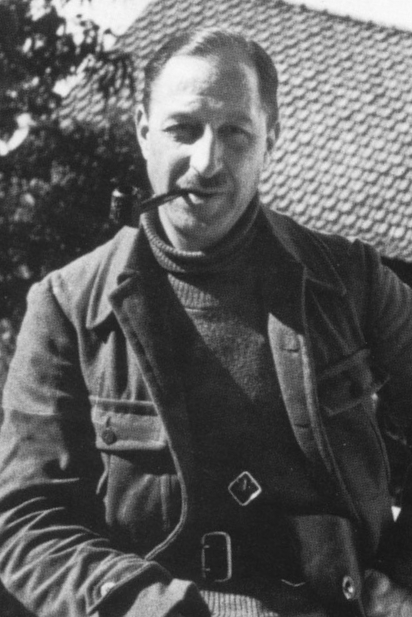
- Nathan in Spain, c. 1937
- Nickname: George Nathan
- Born: 20 January 1895; Hackney, London, England
- Died: 16 July 1937 (aged 42) Madrid, Spain
- Allegiance: (United Kingdom) British Empire (Spain) Second Spanish Republic
- Branch: (United Kingdom) Army Cyclist Corps (1913-17) (United Kingdom) Royal Warwickshire Regiment (1917-20) (United Kingdom) Auxiliary Division (1920-21) (United Kingdom) West Yorkshire Regiment (1921-22) (United Kingdom) Royal Fusiliers (1925-26); International Brigades (1936-37)
- Rank: Lieutenant (British Army); Major (International Brigades)
- Commands: Chief of Staff of the XV International Brigade
- Conflicts: World War I Anglo-Irish War; Spanish Civil War: Battle of Lopera; Battle of Jarama; Battle of Brunete

Samuel George Montague Nathan (20 January 1895 – 16 July 1937) was an English soldier who served in the British Army during World War I, the Royal Irish Constabulary's Auxiliary Division during the Anglo-Irish War and the International Brigades in the Spanish Civil War. During his service in the Auxiliary Division, Nathan was suspected of being involved in the assassination of two Sinn Féin politicians, which later contributed to the alienation of Irish volunteers in the International Brigades from their British counterparts during the Spanish Civil War.

In the Spanish Civil War, Nathan initially commanded the British company of the majority-French Marseillaise Battalion but was appointed battalion commander in early 1937 following the execution of his predecessor for espionage. Nathan later became Chief of Staff of the XV International Brigade and was killed in action on 16 July 1937 at the Battle of Brunete. Even though he had been turned down in his attempt to join the Communist Party of Great Britain either because of his "sexual orientation" or because of his unwillingness to "pretend great political enthusiasm" - Comintern observers admired him for his "cool arrogance under fire".

== Background ==
Samuel George Montague Nathan was born in Hackney, London in 1895. His father was Jewish and the Nathans had been settled in England since the 18th century. His mother was an Englishwoman and was a Christian. George Nathan himself was baptised into the Church of England at St Mark's, Bow Street on 24 January 1897. Although nominally raised an Anglican and identifying himself as such earlier in life, after 1917 he referred to himself as Jewish.

== Military ==
=== World War I ===
During the First World War, he fought in the British Army on the Western Front. He rose from private to company sergeant major and "after three years and 334 days in the service, he was commissioned in the field on 9 April 1917" to become "the only Jewish officer in the Brigade of Guards". This is what he claimed but Nathan was, as his medal index card shows, commissioned into the Royal Warwickshire Regiment and was never a CSM.

=== Irish War of Independence ===
In 1920, Nathan was discharged from the Royal Warwickshire Regiment. On October of that year, Nathan joined the Auxiliary Division of the Royal Irish Constabulary (RIC) and was posted to G Company as a Section Leader, being stationed at the Lakeside Hotel in Killaloe, County Clare. The Auxiliary Division was a paramilitary unit of the RIC and fought in the Irish War of Independence against the Irish Republican Army, working heavily in conjunction with paramilitary RIC constables known as the Black and Tans. Nathan was ordered to return to Dublin on 30 April 1921 and left the Auxiliary Division on 2 May 1921, returning to London.

During his service in the Auxiliary Division, Nathan was suspected of being involved with a series of assassinations in Limerick which took place on 7 March 1921, when the sitting mayor of Limerick, Sinn Féin politician George Clancy, councillor and former mayor Michael O'Callaghan and city clerk Joseph O'Donoghue were all shot and killed in their homes. Groups of plainclothes men had knocked on the door of each, claiming to be a search party and once inside struggled with each party, shooting them. George Clancy's wife Máire, who had struggled with the party before they shot her husband, identified George Nathan in a statement.

An article published in the New Statesman by Richard Bennett in 1961 stated that two former Auxiliary Division members had anonymously identified Nathan as the killer of the two mayors. Local rumours in Limerick claimed that Leslie Ibbotson was the other man involved, but this has never been proven. Frank Percy Crozier, a former Auxiliary Division officer, wrote in his book Ireland for Ever that he agreed with Kathleen O'Callaghan (wife of one of the men killed, Michael O'Callaghan) that the mayors were "murdered by police, acting under orders, as part of a plan to 'do away with' Sinn Fein leaders, and put the blame on Sinn Fein".

=== Spanish Civil War ===
After returning from Dublin, Nathan relinquished his commission and rejoined the British Army; this time the West Yorkshire Regiment as a private, but had left the military by October 1922 at his own request. Having spent his entire adulthood in the military, Nathan was ill-prepared for civilian life. He worked a number of jobs, such as being a doorman for Peter Jones, but was fired after trying to form a trade union. He also worked as a butcher. He briefly rejoined the Army as a private in the Royal Fusiliers but was discharged with ignominy after a Court Martial on 25 May 1926. He traveled to Halifax, Nova Scotia in February 1928, intending to become a farmer, but only found work as a salesman, staying in Canada for some years. His financial state was poor and he wrote to the British Legion in 1935, requesting assistance.

The Spanish Civil War began in the summer of 1936 in the Second Spanish Republic, as a Nationalist insurgency was launched by elements of the Spanish Republican Armed Forces. In September 1936, the Communist International under the control of Joseph Stalin decided to found the International Brigades to assist the sitting Popular Front government (ranging from the bourgeois liberals of the Republican Union to the Marxist-Leninists of the Communist Party of Spain) of the Second Spanish Republic. Nathan elected to travel to Spain in December 1936, where he joined the mostly French Marseillaise Battalion of the XIV International Brigade, as a Captain of the British Company with it.

Nathan's first action in the conflict was at the Battle of Lopera. This was a disaster for the International Brigade, in their attempt to take the town of Lopera, they were decimated by local Andalusian requetés and the Moroccan regulares. 78 of the 145 "British" (which also included Irish) Company died including John Cornford and Ralph Winston Fox. Comintern were embarrassed by this and so André Marty, the political commissar, had Marseillaise Battalion commander Gaston Delasalle executed for "incompetence, cowardice" and being a "fascist spy" (on the recommendation of André Heussler.) That day Nathan had organised a retreat under fire, which saved even more of his men from being killed.

In January 1937, the British Battalion of the XV International Brigade was founded, training at Madrigueras. However, problems emerged when some Irish members were unhappy about being referred to as part of a "British Battalion" (the Communist name of the Saklatvala Battalion had not caught on and the Spanish referred to them even more offensively as "el batallón inglés"). Irish volunteers from the Republican Congress also found out that they were subordinated to two former members of the Auxiliary Division from the Anglo-Irish War; Nathan and Wilfred Macartney. The tension was such that Nathan, confronted, said to Frank Ryan and the other Irishmen that he had indeed served the Auxiliaries in County Limerick.

"If you want to shoot me for what happened in Ireland, all right, but I was under orders."

Nathan denied being a fascist, saying he had come to Spain to fight fascism and that "we are Socialists together now." Joe Monks claims that, "the meeting responded to the spirit of his speech and clapped him." Nevertheless, later that month the Irish volunteers voted 26 for and 11 against the motion to instead join the American Lincoln Battalion as the Connolly Column.

Nathan's purported homosexuality did not go down well with the Communist International representatives (being then defined in official Marxist–Leninist terminology as a "fascist perversion") and though he professed a vague allegiance to socialism, he was not a hardcore Marxist–Leninist and had not been a member of the Communist Party of Great Britain before arriving in Spain. However, he proved to be generally popular among the rank and file of the International Brigades, according to the likes of Jason Gurney and Fred Copeman. Aside from this, as a man with proven military experience, he was an asset at a time when the British volunteers consisted mostly of people with little prior training.

According to Copeman, Nathan performed well during the Battle of Jarama in February, one of the most heated contests of the Spanish Civil War. Particularly on the third day, he is claimed to have been the most capable officer of the XV International Brigade. During this battle, the Brigade lost more than half of their men; 375 out of 600 died; including Christopher Caudwell. Nathan finally came unstuck at the Battle of Brunete where he was killed as a result of bomb fragments from a Junkers Ju 88 aerial bombardment and died on the 17 July 1937. Romantic myth claims he was "buried under olive trees close to the River Guadarrama," but he was actually buried in the village cemetery of Torrelodones, which was along the way on an evacuation route for the combat wounded and dead from Brunete to Madrid.

== Quotes ==
... efficient, capable, with loads of courage; above all, a typical British officer ... who when giving orders left those receiving them under no illusions as to what was required ... At first I thought him a snob, yet I shall never forget on the third day of Jarama, among the chaos and the slaughter, he stood out as the most capable officer.

In Spain, where he invariably appeared immaculately dressed, his boots being polished to the point of dazzlement by one or other of his invariably good-looking batmen, he genuinely found himself a mercenary leader — resourceful, brave and respected by all. The very sight of Nathan, with his gold-tipped swagger stick, was an encouragement to his men.

At the end of the battle, the gallant English major ... was killed.... In his last moments, he ordered those around to sing him out of life. At nightfall he was buried in a rough coffin beneath the olive trees near the River Guadarrama ... "Gal" and Jock Cunningham, two tough men who had been jealous of Nathan, stood listening [to the funeral oration] with tears running down their cheeks.

== Sources ==
- Beevor, Antony. The Battle for Spain: The Spanish Civil War 1936-1939. London: Weidenfeld & Nicolson, 2006. ISBN 978-0-297-84832-5
- Bennett, Richard, "Portrait of a Killer", New Statesman, 24 March 1961, pp 471–472
- Cook, Judith. Apprentices of Freedom. Quartet Books, 1979. ISBN 978-0-7043-2186-1
- Eby, Cecil. Comrades and Commissars, Pennsylvania State University Press, 2007. ISBN 978-0-271-02910-8
- Gurney, Jason. Crusade in Spain, 1974. ISBN 978-0-571-10310-2
- Copeman, Fred. Reason in Revolt, 1948. Blandford Press
- McGarry, Fearghal. Irish Politics and the Spanish Civil War, 1999, Cork University Press. ISBN 978-1-85918-239-0
- Monks, Joe. With the Reds in Andalusia, 1985, John Cornford Poetry Group.
- Szurek, Alek. The Shattered Dream, 1989. Columbia University Press. ISBN 978-0-88033-160-9
- Thomas, Hugh. The Spanish Civil War, 1961. 1st ed.
- Thomas, Hugh. The Spanish Civil War, 2003. 4th Rev. Ed
