= 30th Mixed Brigade =

Unit of the Spanish Republican Army

- 30.ª Brigada Mixta
- Active: December 31, 1936–March 1939
- Country: Spain
- Allegiance: (Second Spanish Republic) Republican faction
- Branch: Spanish Republican Army
- Type: Infantry
- Size: Brigade
- Engagements: Spanish Civil War: Segovia Offensive; Battle of Brunete; Levante Offensive; Battle of Peñarroya

The 30th Mixed Brigade was a unit of the Spanish Republican Army created during the Spanish Civil War. Throughout the war he intervened in various battles, such as the Segovia Offensive, Battle of Brunete, Levante Offensive and the Battle of Peñarroya.

== History ==
The unit was created on December 31, 1936, on the Guadarrama front from the forces of Domingo Moriones, being assigned to the 2nd Division of the I Army Corps. The command of the 30th Mixed Brigade was entrusted to Manuel Tagüeña Lacorte. Among the brigade units was the Alpine battalion, of which part was formed by the Club Peñalara skiers. The 30th Mixed Brigade remained in its positions in the mountains until the spring of 1937.

In May 1937, the brigade was assigned to participate in the Segovia Offensive. On May 30, two of its battalions attacked Cabeza Lijar's position, while another battalion attacked Cabeza Rey, although the assaults were unsuccessful. In July, it took part in the Battle of Brunete, successfully defending its positions on July 22.

In August, Tagüeña took command of a division, (Note: On August 1, 1937, he assumed command of the 3rd Division, who also covered the front of the Madrid highlands.) being relieved by José Suárez Montero. For about a year the brigade remained located at the Madrid front, with its command post at Los Berrocales.

On July 3, 1938, the brigade was assigned to the 61st Division, being sent to the Levante front, under the command of Vicente Pragas, to face the nationalist offensive. On January 13, 1939, it was sent to the Hinojosa del Duque sector, with the 51st Division, to take part in the Battle of Peñarroya.

== Command ==
Commanders

- Manuel Tagüeña Lacorte;
- José Suárez Montero;
- Vicente Pragas;

Commissioners

- Ángel Marcos Salas, of the CNT;
- Diego Pastor, of the JSU;
- Pedro Orgaz Librero, of the PCE;
- Cristóbal Cáliz Almirón, of the PSOE;
- Tomás Catalán;

Chiefs of Staff

- Alejandro Veramendi Bueno;
- Paradinas;
- Ángel Tresaco Ayerra;

== Bibliography ==
- Álvarez, Santiago (1989). Los comisarios políticos en el Ejército Popular de la República (in Spanish). Ediciós do Castro.
- Alpert, Michael (1989). El ejército republicano en la guerra civil (in Spanish). Siglo XXI Editores.
- Alpert, Michael (2013). The Republican Army in the Spanish Civil War, 1936-1939. Cambridge University Press.
- Engel, Carlos (1999). Historia de las Brigadas Mixtas del Ejército Popular de la República (in Spanish). Madrid: Almena. ISBN 84-922644-7-0.
- García Candau, Julián (2007). El deporte en la Guerra Civil (in Spanish). Espasa-Calpe.
- Rojas, Carlos (1975). La Guerra civil vista por los exiliados (in Spanish). GeoPlaneta.
- Zaragoza, Cristóbal (1983). Ejército Popular y Militares de la República, 1936-1939 (in Spanish). Barcelona: Ed. Planeta.
