= John O'Reilly =

John O'Reilly or Jack O'Reilly may refer to:

== Politics ==
- John O'Reilly (politician) (born 1951), Canadian politician
- John B. O'Reilly Jr. (1948–2025), mayor of Dearborn, Michigan
- John Francis O'Reilly (1888–1942), Australian politician
- John Joe O'Reilly (politician) (1881–1967), Irish politician
- John Joseph O'Reilly (1888–1933), Australian politician

== Sports ==
- John O'Reilly (baseball) (born 1995), American baseball player
- John O'Reilly (cricketer) (1930–2024), Australian cricketer
- John Joe O'Reilly (Gaelic footballer) (1919–1952)

== Other fields ==
- John O'Reilly (soldier) (1908–1986), Irish soldier
- John O'Reilly (composer) (born 1940), composer and music theorist
- John Boyle O'Reilly (1844–1890), poet and novelist
- John O'Reilly (engineer) (born 1946), vice-chancellor of Cranfield University

== See also ==
- John O'Reily (1846–1915), Australian bishop
- John O'Riley (c. 1817–1850), Irish soldier
- John Reilly (disambiguation)
- Jack O'Reilly (disambiguation)
