= Eddie Cooper =

Eddie Cooper may refer to:

- Eddie Cooper (actor) (born 1987), British actor
- Eddie Cooper (cricketer) (1915–1968), English cricketer
- Eddie Cooper (footballer), English footballer

== See also ==
- Edward Cooper (disambiguation)
