= Aceituna Campaign =

- Part of the Spanish Civil War
Date	13–31 December 1936
Location	Province of Córdoba, Andalusia, Spain
Result	Nationalist victory

Belligerents
(Spain) Spanish Republic; International Brigades	(Francoist Spain) Nationalist Spain

Commanders and leaders
(Spain) General Martinez Monje (Spain) General Juan Hernández Saravia	(Francoist Spain) Gonzalo Queipo de Llano

Strength
?	4,000 men

Casualties and losses
?	?

The Aceituna Campaign took place during the Spanish Civil War in 1936. In December 1936, the Nationalists launched an offensive in order to occupy the town of Andújar. The Nationalists occupied 2,600 square kilometres (1,000 sq mi) and defeated the Republican Army at Lopera, but failed to occupy Andújar.

== Background ==
In December 1936, Queipo de Llano started an offensive in Córdoba province in order to capture the rich olive-growing area of Andújar, and to relieve the besieged civil guards of the Nuestra Señora de la Cabeza's sanctuary.

== The offensive ==
The Nationalist launched their offensive on 13 December, with 2,000 requetes and moorish troops (later 4,000). On 20 December, the Nationalist occupied the town of Bujalance, on 22 December Pedro Abad and Villafranca. The Spanish Republican Army decided to launch a counteroffensive in order to halt the Nationalist advance and a new Army of the South was organised, under the command of the General Martinez Monje. The XIV International Brigade was sent to the Córdoba front. On 24 December the 9th company of the XIV International Brigade (600 men) was decimated by the Nationalist troops at Villa del Rio (400 dead) and the Nationalist occupied Villa del Rio and Lopera and on 25 December Montoro. On 27 December the XIV International Brigade launched an attack in order to recover the town of Lopera. The Brigade suffered appalling casualties and the attack was called off on 29 December. Among the Republican dead were English poets, John Cornford and Ralph Winston Fox, while Dubliner Tommy Wood was killed at the age of 17. By 31 December the Nationalist occupied the town of Porcuna and halted their advance.

== Aftermath ==
The Nationalists occupied 2,600 square kilometres (1,000 sq mi) of olive-growing land (hence "Aceituna"), some towns and the hydro-electric station at El Carpio. Nevertheless, the Nationalist, did not occupy Andújar and on 1 May 1937 the Republican Army stormed the Nuestra Señora de la Cabeza's sanctuary.

== See also ==
- List of Spanish Nationalist military equipment of the Spanish Civil War
- List of Spanish Republican military equipment of the Spanish Civil War

== Bibliography ==
- Beevor, Antony. (2006). The Battle for Spain. The Spanish Civil War, 1936-1939. Penguin Books. London.
- Moreno Gómez, Francisco. (2008). 1936: el genocidio franquista en Córdoba. Editorial Crítica. Barcelona. ISBN 978-84-7423-686-6
- Thomas, Hugh. (2001). The Spanish Civil War. Penguin Books. London. ISBN 978-0-14-101161-5
