= Edward Cooper =

Edward Cooper may refer to:

- Edward Cooper (West Virginia politician) (1873–1928), West Virginia congressman
- Edward Cooper (mayor) (1824–1905), mayor of New York City 1879–1880
- Edward Cooper (VC) (1896–1985), British recipient of the Victoria Cross
- Edward Cooper (actor) (1883–1956), British actor
- Edward Cooper (pilot boat), New York pilot boat
- Edward Elder Cooper (1859–1908), 19th century black journalist and publisher in the U.S.
- Edward H. Cooper, law professor at the University of Michigan Law School; civil procedure and jurisdiction scholar
- Edward Cooper, real name of Dancing Harry, featured at Madison Square Garden in the early 1970s for all New York Knicks home games
- Edward Synge Cooper (1762–1830), member of the UK Parliament for County Sligo 1806–22
- Edward Joshua Cooper (1798–1863), Irish astronomer and politician, member of the UK Parliament for Sligo County 1830–41 and 1857–59
- Edward Cooper (British Army officer) (1858–1945), commander of the 58th (2/1st London) Division in the First World War
- Edward Henry Cooper (1827–1902), member of the UK Parliament for County Sligo 1865–68
- Edward Henry Burke Cooper (1912–1937), British actor, communist activist, and newspaper worker
- Edward Cooper (publisher) (fl. 1682–1725), English print seller
- Sir Edward Cooper, 1st Baronet (1848–1922), lord mayor of London
- Ed Cooper (ice hockey) (born 1960), retired Canadian professional ice hockey forward
- Ed Cooper (politician), member of the Wyoming Senate
- Ted Cooper (1920–1999), American television set designer, producer and consultant

== See also ==
- Edward Ashley-Cooper (1906–2000), actor
- Eddie Cooper (disambiguation)
