= Gaston Delasalle =

French officer of the Spanish Republic executed for treason

Major Gaston Ernest Delasalle
- Died: January 1937; Albacete, Spain
- Cause of death: Execution by firing squad
- Military career
- Allegiance: (Second Spanish Republic) Spanish Republic
- Rank: Major
- Unit: Marsellaise Battalion
- Conflicts: Black Sea mutiny; Spanish Civil War; Battle of Lopera

Major Gaston Delasalle (? – January 1937) was a French soldier who served as the commander of the Marseillaise Battalion of the International Brigades of the Republicans during the Spanish Civil War. Following his failure at the Battle of Lopera, he was charged by the André Marty with cowardice and treason and executed by firing squad.

== Biography ==
Prior to the Spanish Civil War, Delasalle served as a French military intelligence officer. In 1919, he allegedly took part in attempts to squash the navy mutiny led by André Marty in the Black Sea.

Delasalle was sent from France to Spain in 1936. The major was made commander of the Marseillaise Battalion. In 1937 the Nationalists attempted to cut supply lines to Madrid, Delasalle planned to make a diversion by making an attack against the village of Lopera, which was controlled by the Nationalists. The order for the attack was issued on the night of January 3, 1937. He commanded from the rear, issuing orders that were slow and allegedly caused confusion amongst the ranks. Despite the defeat at the Battle of Lopera and the large casualty toll, the Delasalle retained his popularity among the International Brigades.

Following the battle, the communist leadership sought a scapegoat for the military failure. Witnesses claimed it was Mieczysław Domanski Dubois, the communist Polish medical chief, who first pointed the finger at Major Gaston Delasalle. André Marty, who was now serving as Political Commissar of the International Brigades, happily laid the blame on Delasalle.

Delasalle was arrested in the nurses' quarters at a nearby field hospital, where a girlfriend of his from Barcelona was volunteering as a nurse. A court-martial was set up to try him in a classroom in Arjonilla where Delasalle was accused of working with anarchists and fascists based out of Catalonia and Albacete. André Heussler, a political commissar who would later be deemed a traitor by the French Resistance during World War II, served as the prosecutor. Joseph Putz, a subordinate of Delasalle, who had fought at Lopera, presided over the court. Marty was chief among Delasalle's accusers, crafting the aforementioned theory and claiming that Delasalle had fascist documentation on his person when he was arrested. He was additionally charged with incompetence and cowardice.

Delasalle was ultimately found guilty and sentenced to be shot; he protested his innocence up to his execution. He was executed in January 1937 in Albacete by firing squad. Putz was promoted and given command of the Marseillaise Battalion.

== Legacy ==
In France his execution was received as a scandal, with many criticizing Marty. The death of the popular commander was received by the soldiers as a sign that Marty was a harsh disciplinarian or that this 'absurd' court martial was a biproduct of communist leadership in the International Brigades.

Many scholars today doubt that he was working for the Nationalists, although some recognize he may have been working in part for French Intelligence, based in part on his previous affiliation.
