= Joseph Putz =

French Military Officer

Lt. Col. Joseph Putz
- Born: April 24, 1895; Brussels, Belgium
- Died: January 28, 1945 (aged 49) Grussenheim
- Cause of death: Artillery
- Allegiance: French Third Republic (Second Spanish Republic) Spanish Republic; Free France
- Rank: Lieutenant Colonel
- Commands: Marseillaise Battalion; La Nueve
- Conflicts: World War I; Spanish Civil War; Battle of Lopera; Battle of Jarama; Battle of Bilbao; World War II; Liberation of Paris; Colmar Pocket
- Awards: Companion of the Liberation

Lt. Col. Joseph Putz (April 24, 1895 – January 28, 1945) was a French officer from Brussels, Belgium that served in World War I, the Spanish Civil War, and World War II. He was known for his left wing political views. Following his death, he was posthumously awarded the Companion of the Liberation.

== Biography ==
Putz was born in Brussels, Belgium to a Alsatian family on April 24, 1895. He was raised by his mother, of French descent, who was abandoned by his German father who had refused to acknowledge him.

Putz began his military career during World War I as an infantry and tank officer. He would be injured via gas in the war.

=== Spanish Civil War ===
During the Spanish Civil War, Putz volunteered for the French forces in the International Brigades. He would come out of the conflict with the rank of Lieutenant Colonel and a reputation for his left wing politics.

Early into his service, Putz would fight in the Battle of Lopera before quickly going on to be one of the soldiers presiding over the court martial of his then commanding officer, Delasalle. Later he would admit to a colleague, Nick Gillain, that the execution was not on account of military failure or treachery but due to Delasalle's connection with Anarchists in Barcelona. Putz would take command of the mostly French Marseillaise Battalion. He notably fought and was injured in the Battle of Jarama while leading the battalion.

Putz was then given command of the 1st Basque Division on June 14 of 1937. This would thrust him into a leadership role during the Defense of Bilbao.

=== World War II ===
In 1939, Putz worked as an official for the Algerian colonial administration. He would continue to so until the rise of Vichy France, which he feared would arrest him, and would then flee to southern Morocco where he would eventually join the Free French after the Allied invasion.

Putz would help put together the Corps Francs d'Afrique before going on to serve as the commander of the third battalion of the French Régiment de marche du Tchad. Putz would utilize his Spanish connections, such as Miguel Buiza and Miguel Campos, to encourage many Spaniards to join their unit opposing Vichy France. This would help establish La Nueve, which Putz would take a leadership position role in under the command of captain Dronne. He would also allow the unit to name their tanks after battles from the Spanish Civil War, purposefully avoiding the names of politicians, in order to better welcome the large contingent of Spanish volunteers.

During World War II, Putz would be part of the French leadership in the retaking of Paris in August 1944. He served under Colonel Pierre Billotte, with the colonel splitting his forces in preparation for combat within the city's streets and placing Putz in charge of one of the groups.

Putz died on January 28, 1945 in the village of Grussenheim. He was a victim of artillery during the Colmar Pocket operation.

== Awards ==
Putz was posthumously awarded the Companion of the Liberation by decree on March 24, 1945.
