= John Rickman =

John Rickman may refer to:

- John Rickman (activist) (1910–1937), British communist activist
- John Rickman (broadcaster) (1913–1997), British broadcaster and journalist
- John Rickman (parliamentary official) (1771–1840), British statistician and parliamentary official
- John Rickman (psychoanalyst) (1891–1951), British psychoanalyst
