= 2nd Division (Spain) =

2nd Division 2.ª División
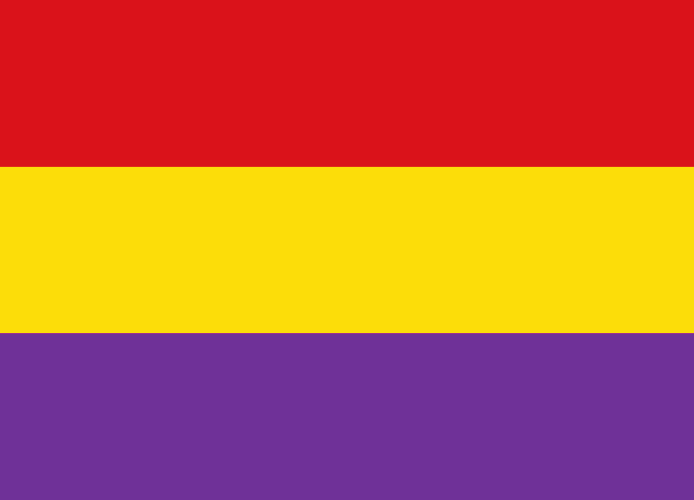
- Military flag of the Popular Army
- Active: 1936–1939
- Country: Spanish Republic
- Branch: Spanish Republican Army
- Type: Infantry division
- Role: Home Defence
- Part of: 1st Army Corps (1936 - 1939)
- Engagements: Spanish Civil War

Commanders
- Notable commanders: Luis Barceló Jover

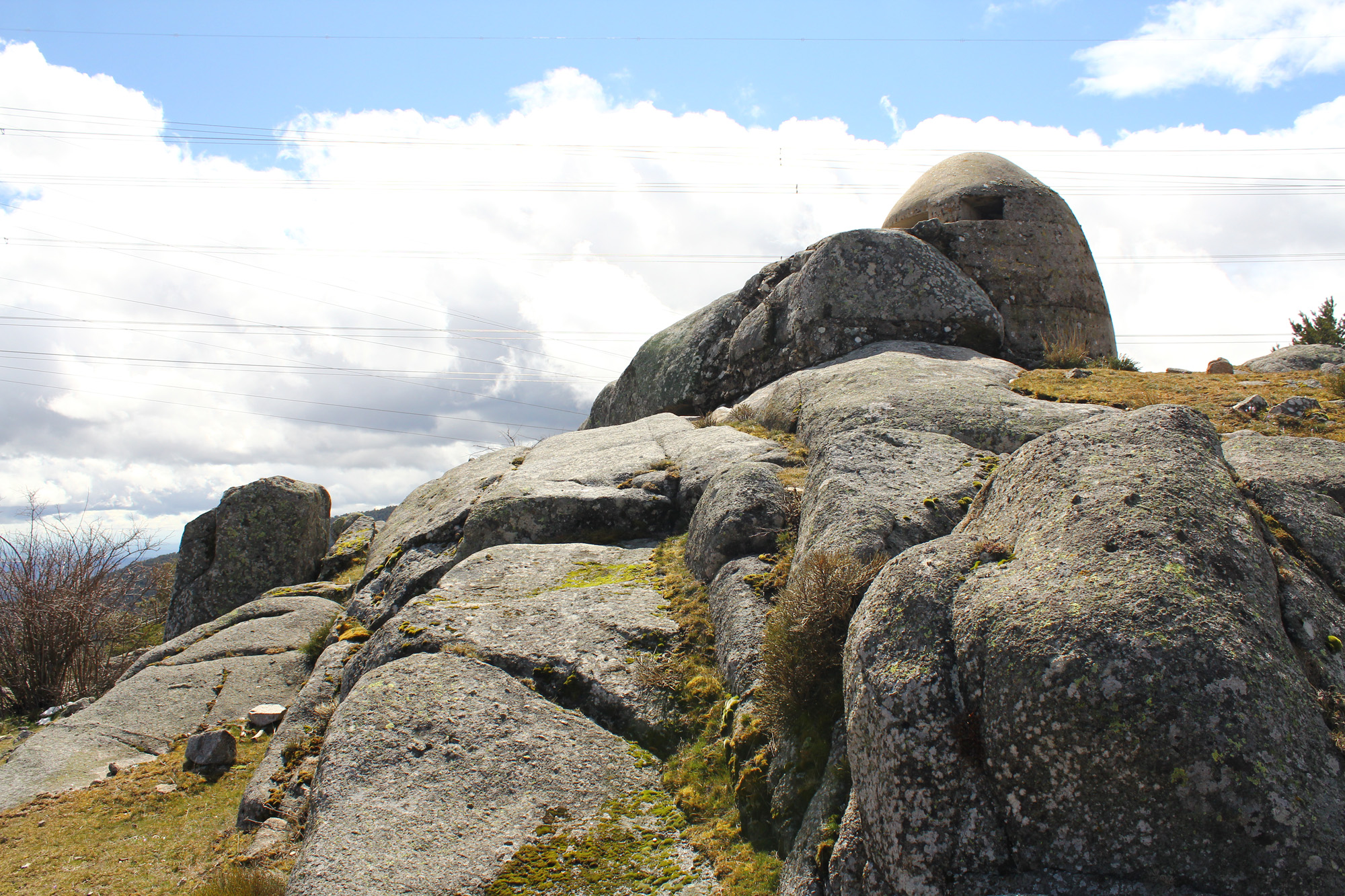
Gun emplacement in the Alto del León from the time of the Spanish Civil War.

The 2nd Division (Spanish: 2.ª División) was a division of the Spanish Republican Army in the Spanish Civil War.

This unit took part in the Segovia Offensive in June 1937.

== History ==
The Second Division was established on 31 December 1936 with the militia forces that had been operating in the mountainous area north of Madrid. During the Segovia Offensive it carried out a diversionary attack in the Alto del León led by Lt. Colonel Luis Barceló.

During the rest of the war it stayed in the same relatively inactive mountain front and was finally disbanded on 27 March 1939.

== Order of Battle ==
Date	Army Corps	Mixed Brigades	Battlefront
December 1936	1st Army Corps	29th, 27th and 31st	Center
December 1937	1st Army Corps	29th, 27th and 31st	Center
April 1938	1st Army Corps	29th, 27th and 34th	Center

== Leaders ==
Commanders

- Engineering Lt. Colonel Domingo Moriones;
- Infantry Colonel Enrique Navarro Abuja;
- Infantry Lt. Colonel Luis Barceló Jover;
- Militia Major José Suárez Montero;
- Militia Major Casto Losada Quiroga;

Commissar

- José Delgado Prieto, member of the Spanish Socialist Workers' Party (PSOE);

Chief of Staff

- Engineering Captain Juan Manzano Porqueres;

== See also ==
- Mixed Brigades

== Bibliography ==
- Alpert, Michael (2013). The Republican Army in the Spanish Civil War, 1936–1939. Cambridge University Press. ISBN 978-1-107-32857-0.
- Engel Masoliver, Carlos (1999). Historia de las Brigadas mixtas del Ejército popular de la República, 1936-1939. Madrid: Editorial Almena. ISBN 84-96170-19-5.
- Romero Salvadó, Francisco J. (2013). Historical Dictionary of the Spanish Civil War. Scarecrow Press. ISBN 978-0-8108-8009-2.
- Thomas, Hugh (1976). Historia de la Guerra Civil Española. Barcelona: Círculo de Lectores. ISBN 84-226-0874-X.
- Zaragoza, Cristóbal (1983). Ejército Popular y Militares de la República, 1936-1939. Barcelona: Ed. Planeta.
