= Jack O'Reilly =

Jack O'Reilly may refer to:

- Jack O'Reilly (association footballer), Irish footballer
- Jack O'Reilly (Gaelic footballer), Irish Gaelic footballer
- Jack O'Reilly (rugby league), Australian rugby league player and coach
- John B. O'Reilly Jr., American politician, mayor of Dearborn, Michigan

== See also ==
- John O'Reilly (disambiguation)
