= Gustavo Durán =

Spanish military officer

Gustavo Durán Martínez
- Born: Gustavo Durán Martínez; November 4, 1906; Barcelona, Spain
- Died: March 26, 1969 (aged 62); Athens, Greece
- Military career
- Allegiance: (Second Spanish Republic) Spanish Republic
- Branch: Army
- Service years: 1936–1939
- Rank: Lieutenant Colonel
- Commands: Mixed brigade (1936), chief of the SIM in the Central zone (1937), Division (1936–1938)
- Conflicts: Spanish Civil War: Siege of Madrid; Second Battle of the Corunna Road; Segovia Offensive; Battle of Brunete; Aragon Offensive; Levante Offensive

Gustavo Durán Martínez (4 November 1906 – 26 March 1969) was a Spanish composer, Lieutenant Colonel in the Spanish military, diplomat and United Nations official.

== Early life ==
Born in Barcelona, Spain in 1906, he moved with his family to Madrid at the age of four, and studied music. During his piano studies he befriended Federico García Lorca, Salvador Dalí, Buñuel, Rafael Alberti (some of whose poems he set to music) and other Residencia de Estudiantes guests. In 1927 he composed a ballet, Fandango del Candil, for Spanish dancer Antonia Mercé, La Argentina, and accompanied her on a European tour. In 1929 he moved to Paris, where he lived with and served as manager, secretary, and partner to the Canarian painter Néstor Martín-Fernández de la Torre until 1934. During this period, Durán also studied under Paul Le Flem of the Schola Cantorum. In 1933 he became an employee of the Spanish section of Paramount Pictures, and continued in that role, after returning to Madrid, at Fono-Espana, Inc., where he dubbed and scored films for the Latin American market. He was a leading figure in the Motorizado, the motorized section of the socialist youth movement associated with Prieto.

== Spanish civil war ==
He served in the Army of the Spanish Republic from July 18, 1936, until the end of war. In 1936 he was the chief of staff of Kleber. In winter 1936 he served informally as chief-of-staff to Kléber during the defence of Madrid (citation: J. Juárez, Comandante Durán (Barcelona, 2009), p. 153; R. Skoutelsky, Novedad en el frente (Madrid, 2006), p. 95) and was aligned with the PCE until early 1937, but quite possibly never became a party member (citation: J. Juárez, Comandante Durán, pp. 235–236; A. Orlov, The March of Time (London, 2004), p. 336).After that, he was the republican commander of one Mixed Brigade in the Second Battle of the Corunna Road in November 1936 and in the Segovia Offensive and the Battle of Brunete he led the 69th division. He covered the retreat of the republican forces in the Maestrazgo during the Aragon Offensive and was one of the Republican commanders in the defense of the XYZ Line in 1938. He also served briefly in SIM, the (Servicio de Investigación Militar), as chief of the department for the Army of the centre. In March 1939, when Franco's troops had reached Valencia, Durán escaped from Gandia, Spain, aboard a British destroyer, landing at Marseille and, eventually, London.

== Exile ==
In May 1940, Durán emigrated to New York City, where he was employed by the Office of the Coordinator of Inter-American Affairs to work at the Museum of Modern Art. From there he moved to the Music Division of the Pan American Union, Washington. In 1942, he was granted US citizenship and was transferred to the Havana embassy on the recommendation of his old friend Ernest Hemingway, who had made him a character in his novel For Whom The Bell Tolls. In May 1945, he went to Buenos Aires, where he served as assistant to the Ambassador, Spruille Braden. He was investigated by FBI due to his supposed engagement in the so-called Usera Tunnel scam, but no link has been established.

=== UN officer ===
In October, 1946, after rising to the position of special assistant to the Assistant Secretary of State, he resigned from the State Department and entered the United Nations, where he served as an officer in the Social Department of the Refugee Division. He was accused that year by a U.S. Representative, J. Parnell Thomas, of being an agent of the Russian police and a member of the Comintern. In 1951, Senator Joseph McCarthy, drawing on a report written for the Spanish Falangist journal Arriba (Madrid), denounced him as a communist and member of the Communist-dominated military intelligence, SIM. As a UN officer, he helped start Unesco, CEPAL and was sent to Congo in 1960. He died in Athens in 1969 and he was buried in Alones of Rethymno in Crete.

== Family ==
Durán married Bontë Romilly Crompton, in Totnes, Devon on 4 Dec 1939. Bontë (1914–2002) was the eldest daughter of David Henry Crompton and Lillian MacDonald Sheridan; she was a great-granddaughter of John Romilly, 1st Baron Romilly, her sister Catherine married Baron Henry Walston.

Durán and Bontë were the parents of Cheli Durán Ryan, an author of children's books; Lucy Durán, ethnomusicologist; and Jane Duran, poet.

== In fiction ==
His figure inspired Hemingway's For Whom the Bell Tolls, Andre Malraux's L'Espoir. and Max Aub's Campo de Sangre. Horacio Vázquez-Rial wrote El soldado de porcelana about him.
