= 80th Mixed Brigade =

80th Mixed Brigades
- 80.ª Brigada Mixta
- Active: February 1937–March 1939
- Country: Spain
- Allegiance: (Second Spanish Republic) Republican faction
- Branch: Spanish Republican Army
- Type: Infantry
- Size: Brigade
- Part of: 21st Division
- Garrison/HQ: Jaén
- Engagements: Spanish Civil War: Levante Offensive

The 80th Mixed Brigade was a unit of the Spanish Republican Army created during the Spanish Civil War. Located on the secondary front of Andalusia, the brigade played a minor role during the war.

== History ==
The unit was created in February 1937 on the Jaén-Granada front from the "Granada" and "Maroto" battalions, as well as confederal militia forces from the Noalejo sector. The command of the new brigade fell to Enrique García Moreno, while the command of the General Staff was entrusted to José Gavilanes Verea. In April the 80th Mixed Brigade was assigned to the 21st Division; (Note: As of June 1937, the division was integrated into the IX Army Corps. The 80th Mixed Brigade was assigned to the 21st Division throughout the entire conflict.) By then it had its headquarters in Jaén and covered the Frailes-Mures-Charilla sector.

García Moreno was briefly replaced in June 1937 by Antonio Gallego Abril, and shortly after by Carlos Cuerda Gutiérrez. He held command of the unit until January 20, 1938, when he was replaced by Manuel Galván Rodríguez.

In May 1938, one of the unit's battalions was sent as reinforcement to the Levante front, being replaced by another battalion made up of recruits. In October, it was relieved of its positions by the 106th Mixed Brigade, with the 80th Mixed Brigade being subjected to a reorganization in the Martos and Torredonjimeno area. In November, it was scheduled to participate in an attack against Granada, but the operation was eventually thwarted and instead it participated alongside the 78th Mixed Brigade in an attack against the Tózar-Limones sector — which resulted in the near destruction of its 3rd battalion. It remained on the Andalusian front until the end of the war.

== Controls ==
Commanders

- Enrique García Moreno;
- Antonio Gallego Abril;
- Carlos Cuerda Gutiérrez;
- Manuel Galván Rodríguez;

Commissars

- Ángel Marcos Salas, of the CNT;
- Severiano Rico Leal;

Chief of Staff

- José Gavilanes Verea;

== Bibliography ==
- Álvarez, Santiago (1989). Los comisarios políticos en el Ejército Popular de la República (in Spanish). Ediciós do Castro.
- Álvarez Rey, Leandro; Lemus López, Encarnación (1998). Historia de Andalucía Contemporánea (in Spanish). Universidad de Huelva.
- Engel, Carlos (1999). Historia de las Brigadas Mixtas del Ejército Popular de la República (in Spanish). Madrid: Almena. ISBN 84-922644-7-0.
- Zaragoza, Cristóbal (1983). Ejército Popular y Militares de la República, 1936-1939 (in Spanish). Barcelona: Ed. Planeta.
