= Battle of Caspe =

1938 battle during Spanish civil war

- Part of the Spanish Civil War
Date	March 16–17, 1938
Location	Caspe, Aragon, Spain
Result	Nationalist victory

Belligerents
Spanish Republic	Nationalist Spain

Commanders and leaders
?	(Francoist Spain) Fernando Barron (Francoist Spain) Agustín Muñoz Grandes (Francoist Spain) Bautista Sánchez

Strength
XV International Brigade	Three divisions

The Battle of Caspe took place during the Aragon Offensive of the Spanish Civil War in 16–17 March 1938.

== Background ==
After the Battle of Teruel, the Republican Army in Aragon was exhausted and badly equipped. In March 1938 a huge Nationalist force of 150,000 men and more than 900 planes started an offensive in Aragon, breaking the Republican front. Most of the units of the Republican Army fled and the retreat became a rout, but in some points others fought bravely.

== Battle of Caspe ==
On 9 March the Nationalists advanced 36 kilometres, on 10 March they occupied Belchite held by the XV International Brigade, and pushed forward to Caspe. Then, the commander in chief of the Republican army, Vicente Rojo ordered the establishment of a defensive line with the town of Caspe at its centre. By 16 March three Nationalist divisions of the Varela's Army, led by Fernando Barrón, Muñoz Grandes and Bautista Sánchez, surrounded the town held by the XV International Brigade. The Brigade fought with great valour, but after two days of heavy fighting Caspe fell to the Nationalists.

== Aftermath ==
The Nationalists continued their advance and by 3 April occupied Lérida.

== See also ==
- List of Spanish Nationalist military equipment of the Spanish Civil War
- List of Spanish Republican military equipment of the Spanish Civil War
