= Luis Barceló =

Spanish military officer

- Born: Luis Barceló Jover; July 31, 1896; Madrid, Kingdom of Spain
- Died: March 15, 1939 (aged 42); Madrid, Spain
- Military career
- Allegiance: (Second Spanish Republic) Spanish Republic
- Branch: Army
- Rank: Colonel
- Commands: Commander of the 35th Mixed Brigade (1936); 2nd Division (1937); I Army Corps of the Army of the Centre (1939)
- Conflicts: Spanish Civil War: Siege of the Alcazar; Second Battle of the Corunna Road; Segovia Offensive; Final offensive of the Spanish Civil War (executed)

Luis Barceló Jover (31 August 1896 – 15 March 1939) was a Spanish military officer.

== Spanish Civil War ==
A professional officer of the Spanish Army, he supported the Republican government during the Spanish Civil War. In 1936 he was a major of the Spanish army. In July 1936, he was one of the officers who set up summary courts to try the rebel officers captured after the failure of the coup in Madrid. In September 1936, he took part in the Siege of the Alcazar. Later, he joined the Communist Party of Spain and led one mixed brigade of Juan Modesto's division in the Second Battle of the Corunna Road. Later, he was promoted to colonel and in June 1937, he became one of the Republican commanders in the Segovia Offensive. In 1939, he was the commander of the I Corps of the Republican Army of the Centre.

== Casado coup and execution ==
On March 5, 1939, the Colonel Segismundo Casado, an officer of the Republican Army, supported a section of the PSOE (Julián Besteiro), a section of the UGT (Wenceslao Carrillo), the CNT (Cipriano Mera), the general Manuel Matallana and the secret service of the Republic (SIM), staged a coup, deposed the prime minister, Juan Negrín, and established the National Defence Council (Consejo Nacional de Defensa) to start peace negotiations with Francisco Franco. The Council dismissed the communist commanders of the I, II, and III Corps of the Army of the Centre, such as Barceló, but he rejected the authority of the Council, and on March 7, he appointed himself as Commander of the Army of the Centre, set up his headquarters in the Pardo Palace and entered with his troops in Madrid, supported by the Bueno's II Corps and the Ortega's III Corps, starting a brief civil war inside the Republic. After days of bloody combat, he was defeated by Cipriano Mera's IV Corps and surrendered himself to the Council on March 12. On March 13, he and his commissar, José Conesa, were sentenced to death by a military tribunal and executed.

== Sources ==
- Beevor, Antony. (2006). The battle for Spain. The Spanish Civil war, 1936–1939. Penguin Books. London. ISBN 978-0-14-303765-1.
- Preston, Paul. (1995). Franco. Fontana Press. London. ISBN 978-0-00-686210-9.
- Preston, Paul. (2006). The Spanish Civil War. Reaction, Revolution & Revenge. Harper Perennial. London. ISBN 978-0-00-723207-9. ISBN 0-00-723207-1.
- Thomas, Hugh. The Spanish Civil War. Penguin Books. 2001. London. ISBN 978-0-14-101161-5
