= Ángel Marcos Salas =

Spanish trade unionist

- Born: 1904; Madrid, Spain
- Died: 12 December 1988 (aged 83–84); Tolosa, Occitania, France
- Military career
- Allegiance: Spanish Republic
- Service: Confederal militias (1936–1937); Spanish Republican Army (1937–1939)
- Service years: 1936–1939
- Rank: Commissar
- Units: Rosal Column; 30th Mixed Brigade; 80th Mixed Brigade; 140th Mixed Brigade
- Conflicts: Spanish Civil War: Battle of the Ebro

Ángel Marcos Salas (1904–1988) was a Spanish mechanic, trade unionist and militiaman who fought in the Spanish Civil War.

== Biography ==
Ángel Marcos Salas was born into a working class family in Madrid, in 1904. At the age of 19, he went to work at the Madrid, Zaragoza and Alicante railway. Soon after, he became member of the railworkers' union of the National Confederation of Labour (CNT).

In July 1936, after the outbreak of the Spanish Civil War, he was appointed a member of the Confederal Committee at the Madrid Atocha railway station. He later joined the Rosal Column, and went on to command a centuria within it. After the militarisation of the confederal militias, he joined the political commissariat of the Spanish Republican Army. He came to serve as commissar of the 30th, 80th and 140th Mixed Brigades, within which he fought in the Battle of the Ebro.

After the end of the war he went into exile in France, where he was interned in a concentration camp. In 1941, he went to work as a mechanic at an aircraft plant in Tolosa. He worked there for 25 years, before retiring in 1966. He remained active within the exiled Spanish anarchist movement, as a member of the CNT's National Federation of the Railway Industry (FNIF). He sided with the CNT's reformist faction when it split and was a delegate to its subcomittee in London. He also acted on the council of the Ateno Libertario in Toulouse. After the reunification of the CNT, in 1969, he was expelled from the organisation.

Marcos Salas died in Tolosa on 12 December 1988.

== Bibliography ==
- Álvarez, Santiago (1989). Los comisarios políticos en el Ejército Popular de la República (in Spanish). Ediciós do Castro.
- Engel, Carlos (1999). Historia de las Brigadas Mixtas del Ejército Popular de la República (in Spanish). Madrid: Almena. ISBN 84-922644-7-0.
- Íñiguez, Miguel (2001). "MARCOS SALAS, Angel". Esbozo de una enciclopedia histórica del anarquismo español (in Spanish). Madrid: Fundación de Estudios Libertarios Anselmo Lorenzo. p. 372. ISBN 9788486864453. OCLC 807322760.
- Tagüeña, Manuel (2005). Testimonio de dos guerras (in Spanish). Barcelona: Planeta.
