= Henri Barbusse Battalion =

- Active: December 1936 – 1938
- Country: France
- Allegiance: Republican Spain
- Branch: International Brigades
- Type: Infantry
- Size: Battalion
- Part of: XIV International Brigade
- Patron: Henri Barbusse
- Engagements: Spanish Civil War: Battle of Jarama; Battle of the Ebro

Commanders
- Notable commanders: Joseph Putz

The Henri Barbusse Battalion was a French International Brigade battalion during the Spanish Civil War. The Battalion served in the XIV International Brigade. It was named after French communist and writer, Henri Barbusse, who died in 1935.

== History ==
The Henri Barbusse Battalion was formed in December 1936 as part of the XIV International Brigade. The first commander was Joseph Putz, who, although not a communist, had served with distinction in World War I and was thus appointed on the basis of his military experience. By February 1937 Putz was head of the XIV International Brigade, only to be wounded in the Battle of Jarama.

In 1938 the Battalion was involved in the Battle of the Ebro, suffering numerous casualties. On 25 July 1938 they had crossed the Ebro further downstream near Amposta, one of only two battalions to cross the river, the other being the Commune de Paris Battalion at Campredó. The Henri Barbusse Battalion held on during the day and were able to withdraw across the river overnight.

== Personnel ==
- Landrieu, Pierre
- Landrieux, Pierre
- Joseph Putz - commander
