= 21st Division (Spain) =

- 21.ª División
- Active: 3 April 1937–March 1939
- Country: Spain
- Allegiance: (Second Spanish Republic) Republican faction
- Branch: Spanish Republican Army
- Type: Infantry
- Size: Division
- Garrison/HQ: Jaén
- Engagements: Spanish Civil War

The 21st Division was one of the divisions of the Spanish Republican Army that were organized during the Spanish Civil War on the basis of the Mixed Brigades. Situated on the Andalusian front, the division played a minor role.

== History ==
The unit was created on 3 April 1937, within the Army of the South. The 21st Division was born from the militarization of the old Granada sector. (Note: The other unit that emerged from the militarization of the old Granada Sector was the 22nd Division, commanded by commander Urbano Orad de la Torre.) It was made up of 76th, 79th and 80th mixed brigades, with its headquarters in Jaén. As of June 1937, the division was integrated into the IX Army Corps.

== Command ==
Commanders

- Antonio Gómez de Salazar;
- Martín Calvo Calvo;
- Carlos Cuerda Gutiérrez;
- Luis Bárzana Bárzana;
- Eloy Marín Villanueva;

Commissars

- Rafael Bonilla Pérez, of the CNT;

Chiefs of Staff

- José Mondéjar Gil de Pareja;
- José Rodríguez;

== Order of battle ==
Date	Attached Army Corps	Integrated Mixed Brigades	Battle front
April 1937	-	76th, 79th and 80th	Andalusia
April 1938	IX Army Corps	51st, 76th and 80th	Andalusia
December 1938	IX Army Corps	76th, 80th and 106th	Andalusia

== Bibliography ==
- Alpert, Michael (1989). El ejército republicano en la guerra civil (in Spanish). Siglo XXI Editores.
- Álvarez, Santiago (1989). Los comisarios políticos en el Ejército Popular de la República (in Spanish). Ediciós do Castro.
- Álvarez Rey, Leandro; Lemus López, Encarnación (1998). Historia de Andalucía Contemporánea (in Spanish). Universidad de Huelva.
- Engel, Carlos (1999). Historia de las Brigadas Mixtas del Ejército Popular de la República (in Spanish). Madrid: Almena. ISBN 84-922644-7-0.
- Martínez Bande, José Manuel (1981). La batalla de Pozoblanco y el cierre de la bolsa de Mérida (in Spanish). Madrid: San Martín.
- Zaragoza, Cristóbal (1983). Ejército Popular y Militares de la República, 1936-1939 (in Spanish). Barcelona: Ed. Planeta.
