= Salaria Kea =

American nurse and desegregation activist (1913–1990)

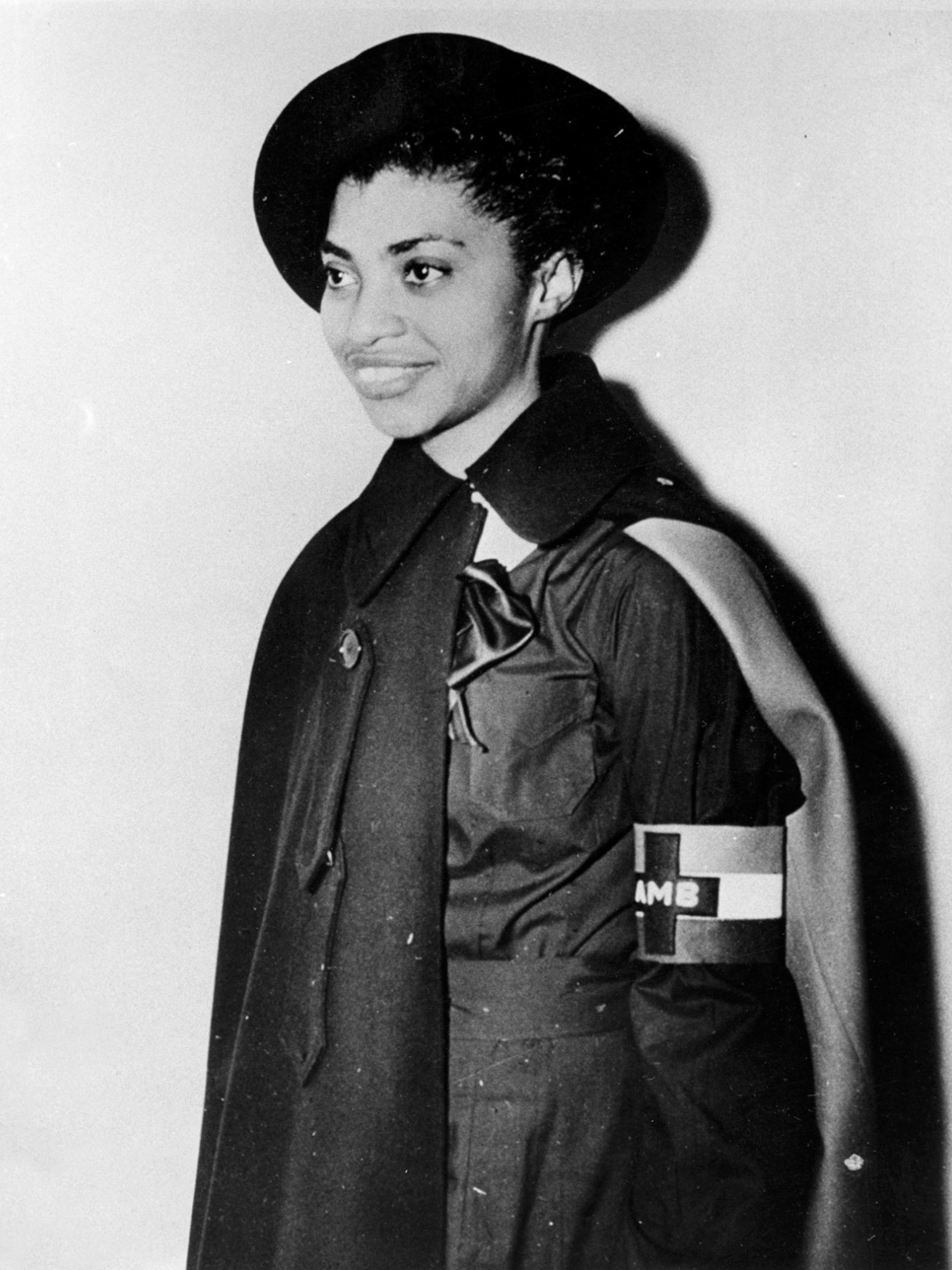
- Kea in March 1937
- Born: 13 July 1913; Milledgeville, Georgia
- Died: 18 May 1990 (aged 76); Akron, Ohio
- Known for: Spanish Civil War; World War II
- Spouse: John O'Reilly (m. 1937)
- Medical career
- Profession: Nurse

Salaria Kea O'Reilly (13 July 1913 – 18 May 1990) was an American nurse and desegregation activist who volunteered in both the Spanish Civil War and the Second World War. During the Spanish Civil War she was the only African-American nurse working in the Abraham Lincoln Battalion.

== Early life ==
Kea was born on 13 July 1913 in Milledgeville, Georgia. Her father was a gardener at the Ohio State Hospital for the Insane in Columbus where he was stabbed to death by a patient when Salaria was a baby. After his death the Kea family moved to Akron. Kea's mother returned to Georgia, leaving Salaria in the care of her three older brothers. Salaria wanted to pursue a career in nursing, but racial segregation policy of the day inhibited this goal in Ohio. She was forced to move on to New York City in 1930, where she graduated from the Harlem Hospital School of Nursing in 1934. As a student she managed to end the segregation in the Harlem Hospital's staff dining room and was also able to improve the working conditions of African American nurses. After her graduation Kea stayed in New York and became the head nurse of Seaview Hospital. During her employment at Seaview she became affiliated with the American left. Some reports indicate that she eventually joined the Communist Party USA in 1935, however Kea herself in later years denied ever having been a member or even having known what communism was in that time period.

== Spanish Civil War ==
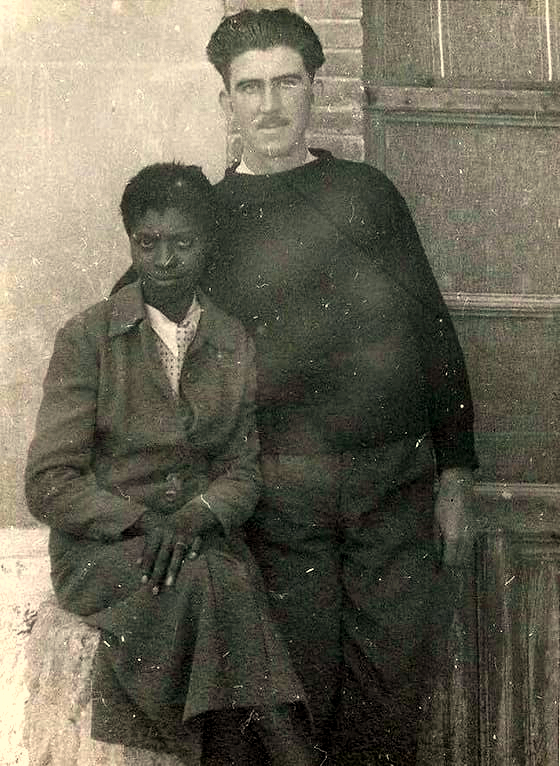
Salaria Kea and her husband John O'Reilly, whom she met while volunteering in Spain

During the Second Italo-Ethiopian War in 1935 Kea and her fellow nurses started raising money to send medical supplies to Ethiopian troops. She was also anxious to work as a nurse in Ethiopia but the emperor Haile Selassie did not accept foreign volunteers. In 1936 she applied to join the American Red Cross to assist Midwest flood victims, but was rejected because of her ethnicity.

Following the outbreak of the Spanish Civil War in 1936 Kea lectured across the United States to raise funds for the Second Spanish Republic. During this time Kea developed strong anti-fascist views. Citing the war in Ethiopia as an influence, Kea decided to volunteer to serve in the International Brigades in the Spanish Civil War and joined the American Medical Bureau working with the Abraham Lincoln Battalion in March 1937. A major inspiration for the move was her Catholic faith.

After her arrival in Spain, Kea helped establish a field hospital at Villa Paz near the Spanish capital Madrid. She was appointed head surgical nurse for an American unit, where she supervised White nurses and treated patients of all nationalities, which would have been impossible in the States.

Kea was captured by the Spanish Nationalist Army but managed to escape with the help of International Brigade soldiers after being held for six weeks. In Villa Paz, Kea met an injured Irish soldier, John O'Reilly, whom she later married. In early 1938, Kea was transferred to different units in Aragon, Lerida and Barcelona and was herself injured in a Nationalist bombing raid. Her wounds were so severe that she was sent back to the United States in May 1938. The same year, Kea wrote her Spanish memoirs While Passing Through. They were published as a pamphlet titled Salaria Kea: A Negro Nurse in Republican Spain. Kea was treated as a celebrity in Black and communist circles. She toured with the Negro Committee to Aid Spain with Thyra J. Edwards in August 1938.

== World War II and later years ==
In 1940, John O’Reilly was allowed to immigrate the United States. He was soon drafted to serve in the military during World War II. In the beginning of 1944, Kea started working as a volunteer nurse for the United States Army as part of the first group of African American nurses the Army was allowed to recruit. In the United States Kea and O’Reilly experienced strong racism. In Akron they experienced personal threats and property damage, and Kea often referred to her time in the International Brigades as the best days of her life since they were free from discrimination. After the war, the O'Reilly family lived in New York, where Kea worked in several hospitals coordinating staff desegregation. In 1973, the couple retired to Akron where Kea died on 18 May 1990. Salaria was featured in the film documentary The Good Fight: The Abraham Lincoln Brigade in the Spanish Civil War (1984).
