= Fernando Barrón =

Spanish military officer

Fernando Barrón y Ortíz
- Born: 1892
- Died: 1952 (aged 59–60)
- Military career
- Allegiance: Nationalist Spain
- Rank: Colonel, later General
- Conflicts: Extremadura Campaign; Siege of Madrid; Corunna Road; Battle of Jarama; Segovia Offensive; Brunete; Battle of Belchite (1937); Aragon Offensive; Battle of Caspe; Battle of the Ebro

Fernando Barrón y Ortiz (1892–1952) was a Spanish military officer. One of the five commanders of the natives troops in Africa, he supported the military coup of July 1936 which started the Spanish Civil War. Later, he was one of the commanders of the Spanish Army of Africa in its advance towards Madrid. In November 1936 led the nationalist attack against the Madrid's suburb of Carabanchel. In December 1936 he led one of General Varela's mobile columns in the Second battle of the Corunna Road. In January 1937 he led a brigade in the Battle of Jarama. In May 1937, he took part in the nationalist counteroffensive during the Segovia Offensive. In June 1937, he led the 13th division in the Battle of Brunete in August in the Battle of Belchite and in March 1938 in the Battle of Caspe. During the Battle of the Ebro he led the Nationalist defense of the town of Gandesa. After the war, he was a minister of the Francoist government.
