= Córdoba offensive =

Battle of the Spanish Civil War

Coordinates: 37°53′5″N 4°46′44″W

- Part of the Spanish Civil War
Date	19–22 August 1936
Location	Near Cordoba, Spain
Result	Nationalist victory

Belligerents
(Spain) Spanish Republic	(Francoist Spain) Nationalists

Commanders and leaders
Gen. José Miaja; Lt. Col. Juan Bernal Segura; Col. Joaquín Pérez Salas; Alejandro Peris	Col. Ciriaco Cascajo; Col. José Enrique Varela

Strength
3,000 men Unknown number of bombers	2,000 men 3 Sa-81 bombers 1 DC-2 bomber

Casualties and losses
High	Unknown

The Córdoba offensive was a failed Republican offensive against the Nationalist held city of Cordoba. It took place from 19 to 22 August 1936 during the Spanish Civil War.

== Background ==
On 18 July, the military governor of Cordoba, Ciriaco Cascajo, started the coup in the city, bombing the civil government and arresting the civil governor, Rodriguez de Leon. After that, he and the civil guard officer Bruno Ibañez, Don Bruno, carried out a bloody repression (in the first weeks, 2,000 persons were executed). In the second week of August, the Nationalist troops were reinforced by 400 regulares who, led by Colonel Varela, after the capture of Huelva, launched an attack eastwards from Seville in order to relieve the besieged nationalist-held city of Granada. After a corridor to the city was established, Varela prepared to attack Malaga. At that point, the Republican Army launched an attack in order to recover Córdoba.

== The offensive ==
The Republican force, led by General Miaja, was composed of 3,000 men, mainly regular troops, civil guards, militiamen from Madrid and local volunteers. Opposing them, the Nationalists had the small force of the Nationalist commander in Cordoba, Colonel Cascajo, and the column of Colonel Varela. The Nationalists also had one DC-2 and several Sa-81 bombers.

The advance of Miaja's force had started on 5 August but its advance was very slow and only occupied small towns like Adamuz and Pozoblanco. The Republican attack against Cordoba itself started on 20 August. The Republican troops reached the gates of Cordoba (5 km from the city), but they were beaten back and the attack failed on 22 August. According to Thomas, the offensive failed because of the skillful use of the Italian Savoia bombers and because Cascajo threatened to execute the family of Miaja who were in Cordoba. According to Beevor, the attack failed because of the incompetence of Miaja and the Republican professional officers. Furthermore, many of Miaja's officers were, in fact, Nationalist supporters (Miaja's adjutant was hoping to cross the lines, and on 23 August one captain, Antonio Reparaz, deserted with 200 civil guards).

== Aftermath ==
Nationalist repression in the towns briefly occupied by the Republicans was very harsh. In the town of Palma del Rio, a local landowner killed 300 supporters of the Republic (the Republicans had killed 42 supporters of the Nationalists there). After a nationalist counter-offensive in September, the Cordoba front was stabilised.

== See also ==
- List of Spanish Republican military equipment of the Spanish Civil War
- List of Spanish Nationalist military equipment of the Spanish Civil War

== Bibliography ==
- Beevor, Antony (2001). The Battle for Spain. The Spanish Civil War, 1936-1939. London: Penguin Books. p. 526. ISBN 9780143037651.
- Moreno Gómez, Francisco (2008). 1936: el genocidio franquista en Córdoba (in Spanish). Barcelona: Grupo Planeta (GBS). p. 1003. ISBN 9788474236866.
- Thomas, Hugh (2001). The Spanish Civil War. London: Modern Library. pp. 1096. ISBN 9780375755156.
