= Segovia Offensive =

Conflict of the Spanish Civil War

- Part of the Spanish Civil War
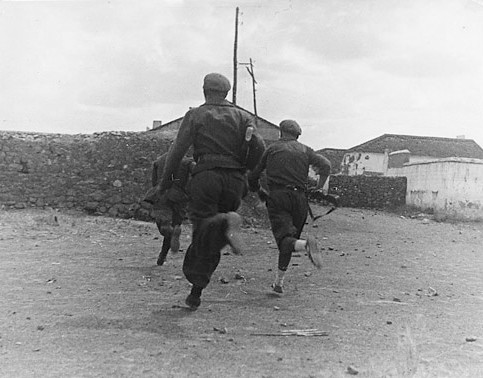
- Republican soldiers during the Segovia Offensive.
Date	31 May – 6 June 1937
Location	Near Segovia, Segovia province, Spain
Result	Nationalist victory

Belligerents
Spanish Republic	(Francoist Spain) Nationalist Spain

Commanders and leaders
(Second Spanish Republic) Domingo Moriones (Second Spanish Republic) Gustavo Durán (Second Spanish Republic) José María Galán; Karol Świerczewski "General Walther"	(Francoist Spain) José Varela (Francoist Spain) Fernando Barrón

Strength
3 divisions	?

Casualties and losses
3,000 casualties	?

The Segovia Offensive was a Republican diversionary offensive which took place between 31 May and 6 June 1937, during the Spanish Civil War. The main goal of the offensive was to occupy Segovia and divert Nationalist forces from their advance on Bilbao. After a brief initial advance the offensive failed due to Nationalist air superiority.

== Background ==
In April 1937, the Nationalists started an offensive against the Republican held, Biscay Province, and, by the end of May, the Navarrese troops had reached the eastern side of Bilbao's defenses. The Republican government then decided to launch two diversionary offensives on the Aragon and Madrid fronts in order to divert Nationalist troops.

== Battle ==
The Republican Army had three divisions in the Sierra de Guadarrama: Galan's 34th, General Walther's 33rd and Duran's 69th divisions (according to Thomas, the commander of the 69th division was Luis Barceló), under the command of Colonel Domingo Moriones, supported by artillery and a company of T-26 tanks.

On 31 May the Republicans started the attack in the Sierra de Guadarrama with a heavy bombardment of the Nationalist positions, broke the Nationalist lines at San Ildefonso and the same day the 69th division occupied Cruz de la Gallega and advanced towards Cabeza Grande, threatening the Segovia Road, although the XIV International Brigade suffered appalling casualties. The Republican advance reached La Granja, but on 1 June the Nationalists started a counteroffensive with General Varela's division, the reinforcements brought from the Madrid front by Barrón and heavy air support. The Nationalists recovered Cabeza Grande and threatened the Republican troops. On 6 June Moriones ordered the Republican troops to retreat to their start lines. The Republicans had lost 3,000 men, among them 1,000 members of the XIV International Brigade.

== Aftermath ==
The Republican offensive failed because of the air superiority of the Nationalists and the ineffectiveness of the Spanish Republican Air Force. Colonel Moriones said: "Our own aircraft carried out bombing attacks from a great height and carelessly...our fighters kept a respectable distance and rarely came down to machine-gun the enemy...enemy aircraft were highly active and extraordinarily effective.". The Segovia offensive only delayed the Nationalist offensive against Bilbao by two weeks.

== In literature ==
The Segovia Offensive is the offensive described in the Ernest Hemingway novel, For Whom the Bell Tolls.

== See also ==
- List of Spanish Republican military equipment of the Spanish Civil War
- List of Spanish Nationalist military equipment of the Spanish Civil War

== Bibliography ==
- Beevor, Antony. The Battle for Spain. The Spanish Civil War 1936-1939. Penguin Books. London. 2006. ISBN 0-14-303765-X
- Thomas, Hugh. The Spanish Civil War. Penguin Books. London. 2001. ISBN 978-0-14-101161-5
