= List of aircraft of Nationalist Spain in the Spanish Civil War =

Aircraft used in Spanish Civil War, by the Spanish Nationalist faction: List

This is a list of aircraft used by the Spanish Nationalist faction in the Spanish Civil War. The aircraft were mainly received from aid from Fascist Italy and Nazi Germany. Aircraft are in chronological order of adoption by the Spanish Nationalist airforce.

== Fighters ==
- Heinkel He 51
- Fiat CR.32
- Heinkel He 112
- Messerschmitt Bf 109

== Bombers ==
- Junkers Ju 52
- Junkers Ju 86
- Fiat BR.20 Cicogna
- Heinkel He 111

== Maritime ==
- CANT Z.501 Gabbiano
- CANT Z.506 Airone
