= John O'Reilly (cricketer) =

Australian cricketer (1930–2024)

Personal information
- Full name: John William O'Reilly
- Born: 16 November 1930; Mosman, Sydney, Australia
- Died: 20 June 2024 (aged 93); Baulkham Hills, Sydney, Australia
- Batting: Right-handed
- Bowling: Right-arm leg break

Domestic team information
- Years: Team
- 1953/54–1959/60: New South Wales
- Source: ESPNcricinfo, 13 January 2017

John William O'Reilly (16 November 1930 – 20 June 2024) was an Australian cricketer. He played seven first-class matches for New South Wales between 1953/54 and 1959/60.

O'Reilly died on 20 June 2024, at the age of 93.

== See also ==
- List of New South Wales representative cricketers
