= Domingo Moriones =

Spanish military officer

Domingo Moriones Laraga
- Born: 1883
- Died: 1964 (aged 80–81)
- Military career
- Allegiance: (Second Spanish Republic) Spanish Republic
- Branch: Army
- Rank: General
- Commands: 2nd Division; 1st Army Corps of the Army of the Center, Andalusian Army (1938–1939)
- Conflicts: Spanish Civil War: Segovia Offensive; Final offensive of the Spanish Civil War

Domingo Moriones Larraga (1883–1964) was a Spanish military officer. Moriones was a professional officer of the Spanish Army. In 1934 he was the military governor in Gijon and took part in the suppression of the 1934 rising there. In July 1936, he remained loyal to the Republic. At the beginning of 1937 he led the 2nd Division in the Somosierra front. He later was appointed commander of the I Army Corps of the Army of the Centre, and in July 1937, he led the republican forces in the failed Segovia Offensive. In 1938, he was the commander of the Republican Andalusia Army. In February 1939, he was one of the military officers who said to the prime minister Juan Negrin that a further military resistance was useless and in March 1939 he supported Casado's coup.

== Bibliography ==
- Beevor, Antony. (2006). The battle for Spain. The Spanish civil war, 1936-1939. Penguin Books. London. ISBN 978-0-14-303765-1.
- Thomas, Hugh. (2001). The Spanish Civil War. Penguin Books. London. ISBN 978-0-14-101161-5
