= Eddie Cooper (footballer) =

English footballer

Personal information
- Full name: Edward Cooper
- Date of birth: 1891
- Place of birth: Walsall, England
- Position: Outside right

Senior career*
Years	Team	Apps	(Gls)
–1912	Stafford Rangers		
1912–1913	Glossop	24	(5)
1913–1920	Newcastle United	45	(2)
1920	Notts County	4	(0)
- Stafford Rangers
- * Club domestic league appearances and goals

Edward Cooper was an English professional footballer who played in the Football League for Glossop, Newcastle United and Notts County as an outside right.

== Personal life ==
Cooper served as a corporal in the West Yorkshire Regiment and the Royal Engineers during the First World War.

== Career statistics ==
Appearances and goals by club, season and competition
Club	Season	League			FA Cup		Total	
Club	Season	Division	Apps	Goals	Apps	Goals	Apps	Goals
Newcastle United	1912–13	First Division	9	1	0	0	9	1
Newcastle United	1913–14	First Division	14	0	0	0	14	0
Newcastle United	1914–15	First Division	11	0	1	0	12	0
Newcastle United	1919–20	First Division	11	1	0	0	11	1
Career total			45	2	1	0	46	2
