= Second Battle of the Corunna Road =

1936–37 battle in the Spanish Civil War

- Part of the Spanish Civil War
Date	13 December 1936 – 15 January 1937; 1 month and 2 days
Location	Near Madrid, Spain 40°24′25″N 3°53′30″W
Result	Republican victory

Belligerents
(Spain) Spanish Republic	(Francoist Spain) Nationalist Spain

Commanders and leaders
(Spain) Vicente Rojo Lluch (Spain) José Miaja (Spain) Luis Barceló (Spain) El Campesino (Spain) Cipriano Mera (Spain) Gustavo Durán (Spain) Juan Modesto (Spain) José María Galán	(Francoist Spain) José Enrique Varela (Francoist Spain) Luis Orgaz Yoldi (Francoist Spain) Sáenz de Buruaga (Francoist Spain) Fernando Barrón Ortiz (Francoist Spain) Francisco García-Escámez

Strength
20,000 infantry, plus reinforcements T-26 light tanks	17,000 infantry and cavalry (13 Dec); 8 artillery batteries of 105 and 155 mm Panzer I light tanks

Casualties and losses
15,000 dead or wounded	15,000 dead or wounded

The Second Battle of the Corunna Road (Spanish: Batalla de la Carretera de Coruña) was a battle of the Spanish Civil War that took place from 13 December 1936 to 15 January 1937, northwest of Madrid. In December 1936, the Nationalists launched an offensive in order to cut the Corunna Road and isolate Madrid, but a Republican counter-offensive stopped the Nationalist advance. The Nationalists cut the Corunna road but failed to encircle Madrid.

== Background ==
The Battle of Madrid in November 1936 had been fought to a standstill, including the First Battle of the Corunna Road, with the Nationalists under Franco failing to take the city. They then started to besiege it, aiming to cut its links to the rest of Spain. Franco decided to attack the city from the north-west in order to cut off water and electricity supplies from the Sierra de Guadarrama and encircle the city. After a failed offensive in November, the Nationalists summoned a force of 17,000 men, led by General Orgaz, with four mobile brigades (led by García Escámez Francisco García Escámez, Barron, Saenz de Buruaga and Monasterio), backed by heavy artillery and Ju 52 bombers. The Republican army had a few battalions led by Luis Barceló.

== Battle ==
=== The Nationalist offensive ===
The Nationalists' offensive started with a heavy artillery bombardment on the 14 December and Franco's troops occupied the town of Boadilla del Monte. As a counter-measure, the Republicans sent a detachment of Russian tanks led by General Pavlov and two International Brigades (XII and XIV) at Boadilla and re-occupied it. Yet they finally became cut-off in the town by Nationalist counter-attacks, and took a defensive stance. After a stalemate, Orgaz decided to halt the offensive on 19 December after gaining a few kilometres.

=== The Battle of the Fog ===
Towards the end of December, Orgaz received reinforcements and decided to relaunch the offensive on 3 January. This offensive became known as the Battle of the Fog. The Republican high command redeployed their units in the Pozuelo-Brunete sector. The Republicans had an army corps led by Miaja with five divisions (led by Nino Nanetti, Modesto, Colonels Perea, Adolfo Prada and Galan) but had little ammunition or supplies.

As the Nationalists advanced on the right flank, the Republican troops collapsed, and Barron advanced from Boadilla and reached Las Rozas on 4 January. Yet in Pozuelo the Republican Modesto division, consisting of four mixed brigades, led by El Campesino, Luis Barcelo, Gustavo Duran and Cipriano Mera, managed to hold the front. Furthermore, the heavy fog slowed the Nationalist advance. On 5 January Nationalist forces under Varela concentrated his eight batteries of 105 and 155 mm artillery, tanks and aircraft on Pozuelo. The Republican troops collapsed and fled in disorder, despite their six Russian T-26 tanks having destroyed 25 German light tanks. With Republican troops scattered without contact and no ammunition, Miaja tried to regroup Lister's brigade and the XIV International Brigade as best as possible.

The Nationalist columns reached the Corunna road at Las Rozas and surrounded Pozuelo. The Republican troops under the German Thälmann Battalion of the XIV International Brigade was ordered to hold Las Rozas and not to retreat. On 7 January, the town was heavily shelled by the Nationalist troops and the Thälmann Battalion subsequently suffered appalling losses, with only 35 men surviving. Historian Hugh Thomas has also claimed that many of the wounded were killed by the Nationalist regulares.

=== Republican counter-attack ===
By 9 January, the Nationalists had conquered seven miles of the Corunna Road from Puerta de Hierro to Las Rozas. On 10 January, the Republicans started a counter-offensive in heavy mist and cold and the XII International Brigade reached recaptured territory to the west of Madrid including the towns of Majadahonda, Villanueva, Pozuelo and Boadilla. However, by 15 January both sides were exhausted and the battle ceased.

== Aftermath ==
The Nationalists cut the Corunna road, but failed to encircle Madrid from the west flank. Both sides suffered about 15,000 killed or wounded. After the Third Battle of the Corunna Road in January 1937 with similar results, the next Nationalist attempt to encircle Madrid was the Battle of Jarama, taking place between 6 and 27 February.

== See also ==
- List of Spanish Nationalist military equipment of the Spanish Civil War
- List of Spanish Republican military equipment of the Spanish Civil War
