= Battle of Bilbao =

Part of the Spanish Civil War (1937)

Coordinates: 43°15′N 2°55′W

- Part of the Spanish Civil War
- The Northern Front. Bilbao is on the right of the red area.
Date	12–19 June 1937
Location	Biscay, Northern Spain
Result	Nationalist victory
Territorial changes	Nationalists capture Biscay from Republicans

Belligerents
Spanish Republic; Basque Army	Nationalist Spain (Fascist Italy) CTV; Condor Legion

Commanders and leaders
(Second Spanish Republic) Mariano Gámir Ulíbarri (Second Spanish Republic) Juan Cueto Ibáñez (surrendered) (Second Spanish Republic) Pablo Belderráin (Second Spanish Republic) Joseph Putz (Second Spanish Republic) Nino Nanetti †; José Antonio Aguirre; Alberto Montaud	(Francoist Spain) Fidel Dávila Arrondo (Francoist Spain) José Solchaga Zala (Francoist Spain) Rafael García Valiño (Francoist Spain) Juan Bautista Sánchez (Nazi Germany) Wolfram Freiherr von Richthofen

Strength
50,000 troops and militia	60,000 Nationalist troops 15,000 Italian troops

Casualties and losses
14,000 killed, wounded, or captured	Nationalist Spain: Unknown; Italy: 105 dead 427 wounded 3 missing

The Battle of Bilbao (Spanish: Batalla de Bilbao, Basque: Bilboko gudua), part of the War in the North in the Spanish Civil War, saw the Nationalist Army capture Bilbao and the rest of the Basque Country that was still being held by the Spanish Republic.

== Background ==
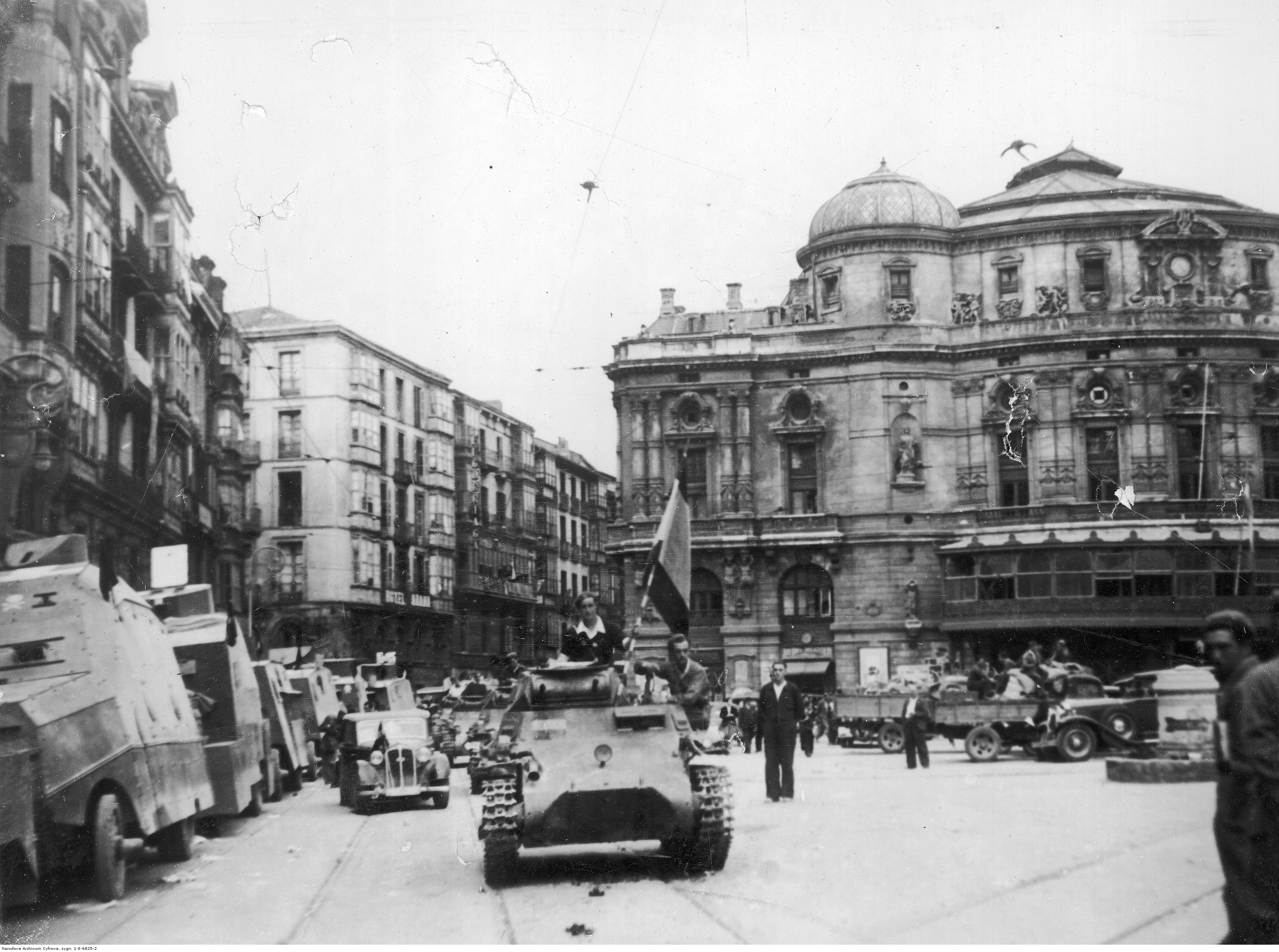
Triumphant nationalist forces parade through Bilbao; a Panzer I light tank passes several armoured vehicles.

Bilbao was the capital of the autonomous Basque area, which had been established by the Spanish Republic after the war began to reward Basque nationalist support of the Republic. The Basque people in Spain generally inhabit four provinces: Navarre, Álava, Gipuzkoa and Biscay. The Basque nationalists were dominant in the last two provinces. Navarre and Álava had rallied to the rising against the Republic.

The Spanish Nationalist troops gained Gipuzkoa early in the war with the fall of Irún in August and San Sebastián on 13 September 1936, isolating the Basque Country and the zone held by the Northern Republicans from the French border. On 31 March, the Nationalists, led by the General Emilio Mola, launched an offensive against Biscay Province. The Basque troops had to retire, and by June, the Nationalists had reached the outskirts of Bilbao.

== Battle ==
By 11 June 1937. the Basque forces had fallen back to the city of Bilbao, which was defended by a series of rushed fortifications called the "Bilbao's Iron Ring". It was poorly designed for defence. It was quite an antiquated concept, akin to First World War fortifications, and so was vulnerable to modern warfare and weapons, such as aircraft and artillery. Also, only 30,000 troops defended it although it had been conceived to be defended by 70,000. Therefore. the Iron Ring was rather easily overcome by Nationalist forces.

The ring was breached by an infantry assault supported by heavy air and artillery bombardment (150 guns and 70 bombers). On 12 June, the Spanish Republican Army launched a diversionary attack against Huesca to stop the Nationalist offensive, but the Nationalist troops continued their advance. On the night of 13 June, the defenders evacuated most of the civilian population from the city. On 18 June, General Ulibarri withdrew his remaining troops from Bilbao, and the Nationalists occupied the city on the following day. The city's bridges had been destroyed to hinder the attackers, but the city remained mostly intact.

== See also ==
- List of Spanish Nationalist military equipment of the Spanish Civil War
- List of weapons of the Corpo Truppe Volontarie
- List of Spanish Republican military equipment of the Spanish Civil War
