= John Francis O'Reilly =

Australian politician

John Francis O'Reilly (19 August 1888 – 11 March 1942) was an Australian politician.

He was born in Newtown to dancing teacher John O'Reilly and Winifred Ward. A hairdresser, he was active in the Hairdressers' Employees' Union, becoming vice-president in 1910, president in 1911, assistant secretary in 1912, and secretary in 1942. From 1931 to 1934 he was a Labor member of the New South Wales Legislative Council. O'Reilly died in North Sydney in 1942.
