= John Rickman (activist) =

British communist activist who was killed during the Spanish Civil War

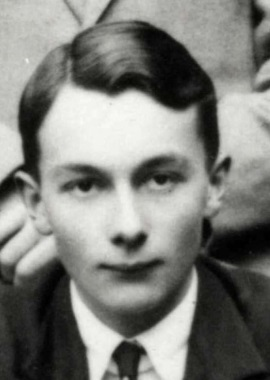
- John Rickman's name on the Oxford Spanish Civil War memorial
- Born: John Pascal Rickman; 1910; Powerstock, England
- Died: 6 April 1937 (aged 26–27); Colmenar de Orejo Hospital, near Madrid
- Cause of death: Injuries sustained during the Battle of Jarama
- Monuments: Oxford Spanish Civil War memorial Family memorial in Powerstock churchyard
- Citizenship: United Kingdom
- Education: Philosophy, politics and economics at Lincoln College, Oxford University (dropped out)
- Organization(s): International Brigade, British Battalion. Toc H. Brothers of the Order of St Francis.
- Known for: Anti-fascist activism. Communist activism
- Political party: Communist Party of Great Britain (CPGB)

John Pascal Rickman (1910–1937) was a British communist activist who was killed during the Spanish Civil War. Before the war, he dropped out from Lincoln College of the University of Oxford, and became an expert on English church architecture, took part in the Battle of Cable Street, and became involved in various religious and political organisations which aimed to better the conditions of the working class, including the Communist Party of Great Britain (CPGB).

In 1937 he was killed outside Madrid from injuries he sustained during the Battle of Jarama. In 2017 his name was included on the newly erected Oxford Spanish Civil War memorial.

== Early life and political activism ==
Rickman was born in Powerstock, a small village near Melplash in Dorset, England. He was the only son of Annie Maide Rickman and her husband William Francis Rickman who was the vicar of Powerstock church.

In 1929 he enrolled onto a degree in Philosophy, politics and economics at Oxford University's Lincoln College, however he dropped out in 1931 without completing his course, with his tutors commenting that he 'can hardly pass' and 'hopeless'. After leaving Oxford he returned to Dorset and settled in Sherborne where he worked with organisations involved in improving the conditions of working-class people such as Toc H, and the Brothers of the Order of St Francis.

Rickman had a strong interest in church architecture, and was credited as having discovered a long-lost book of Dorset church drawings which "proved immensely useful in subsequent preservation work".

In 1936, MI5 had created a file dedicated to John Rickman and began recording all of his activities. Historians believe this was likely a response to Rickman joining the Communist Party. In October that same year, Rickman was present during the Battle of Cable Street where he fought alongside Jews, communists and trade union activists to block a demonstration held by the British Union of Fascists. After the Battle of Cable Street, Rickman told his sister that he would be travelling to France to work for a humanitarian group called the Spanish Youth Foodship Committee, however, when he left Britain he decided to travel to Spain to join the International Brigades and fight for the Second Spanish Republic during the Spanish Civil War.

== Spanish Civil War and legacy ==
Arriving in Spain, Rickman reached the International Brigade's Albacete base in December 1936, and shortly afterwards joined the British Battalion. After less than a month of training he was sent to the front line of the war. Records show that on 1 January 1937, Rickman travelled on the same transport vehicle as Winston Churchill's nephew, Giles Romilly. Rickman was badly injured in February 1937 during the Battle of Jarama.

Rickman died in 'Colmenar de Orejo Hospital', near Madrid in 1937, from injuries he sustained fighting at the Battle of Jarama. His death certificate, currently held by the Marx Memorial Library, dates his death to 6 April 1937. A small memorial to Rickman in his home village was created shortly after his death, with the inscription "He gave his life in the cause of freedom." In 2017 a larger memorial dedicated to six International Brigade members with links to Oxfordshire was raised in east Oxford. This memorial became known as the Oxford Spanish Civil War memorial, and contains John Rickman's name among five others.

== See also ==
- Lewis Clive
- Ralph Winston Fox
- Oxford Spanish Civil War memorial
- Giles Romilly
- Bill Alexander
