= Lopera =

- Municipality
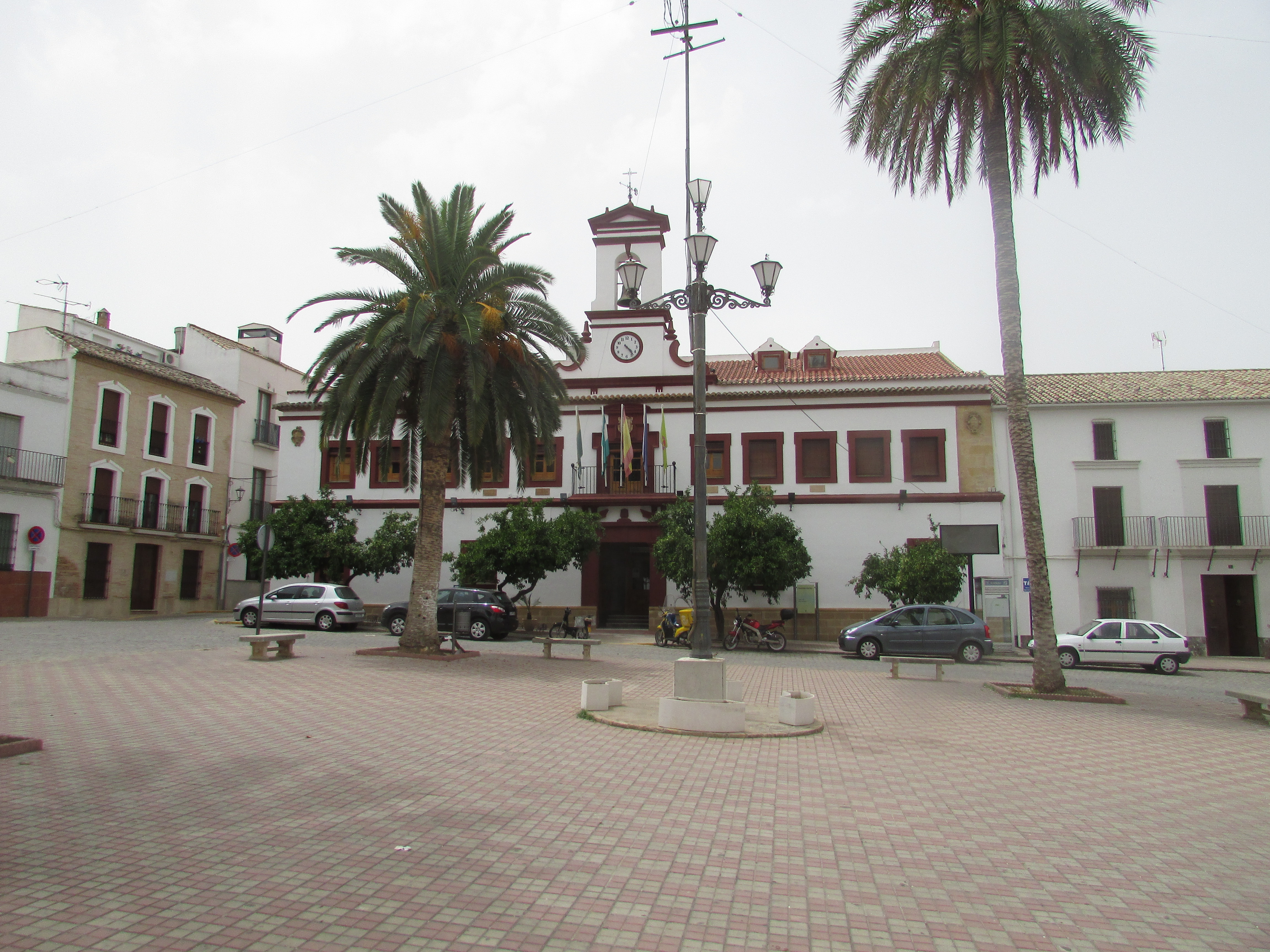
- Town Hall of Lopera (2016)

- Flag Coat of arms

- Location in the Province of Jaén Lopera (Andalusia) Lopera (Spain)
- Coordinates: 37°56′45″N 4°12′54″W
- Country: Spain
- Autonomous community: Andalusia
- Province: Jaén
- Municipality: Lopera

Area
  - Total: 67 km^{2} (26 sq mi)
- Elevation: 276 m (906 ft)

Population (2025-01-01)
  - Total: 3,502
  - Density: 52/km^{2} (140/sq mi)
- Time zone: UTC+1 (CET)
  - Summer (DST): UTC+2 (CEST)

Lopera is a city located in the province of Jaén, Spain. According to the 2014 census, the municipality has a population of 3,837 inhabitants.

== History ==
=== Spanish Civil War ===
The Battle of Lopera took place between 27 and 29 December 1936 during the Spanish Civil War. This battle took place during the Nationalist's Aceituna offensive. On 27 December, the XIV International Brigade launched an attack in order to occupy the Nationalist-held town of Lopera, but the attack failed after two days and the Brigade suffered appalling casualties.

== See also ==
- List of municipalities in Jaén
