= Battle of Lopera =

1936 battle of the Spanish Civil War

- Part of the Aceituna Campaign during the Spanish Civil War
Date	27–29 December 1936
Location	Lopera, Jaén, Spain 37°56′42″N 4°12′54″W
Result	Nationalist victory

Belligerents
(Spain) Spanish Republic	(Francoist Spain) Nationalist Spain

Commanders and leaders
Karol Świerczewski	(Francoist Spain) Luis Redondo

Strength
3,000 international brigadists	2,000 requetes 2,000 Moroccan regulares and Spanish cavalry

Casualties and losses
300 dead 600 wounded 1 executed (Note: Major Gaston Delasalle, the commander of the Marsellaise Battalion)	200 dead

The Battle of Lopera took place between 27 and 29 December 1936 during the Spanish Civil War. This battle took place during the Nationalist's Aceituna offensive. On 27 December, the XIV International Brigade launched an attack in order to occupy the Nationalist-held town of Lopera, but the attack failed after two days and the Brigade suffered appalling casualties.

== Background ==
In December 1936, Queipo de Llano started an offensive in order to capture the olive-growing area of Andújar, province of Jaén. The Republic then sent the recently formed XIV International Brigade to the Andújar front, in order to retake the town of Lopera occupied by the Nationalists on 24 December.

== The battle ==
On 27 December, the Brigade launched an attack in order to recover the town of Lopera. The XIV International Brigade (3,000 men), led by General Walter, had no training or telephone communications. Furthermore, they did not have air or artillery support. On this front the Nationalists had Commander Redondo's column with a shock brigade of Andalusian requetes (2,000 men) and 2,000 Moroccan regulares and Spanish cavalry. The brigade members were decimated by the Nationalists with machine gun fire, mortars and artillery. After 36 hours the attack was called off.

== Aftermath ==
The Brigade had lost 800 men (300 dead), among them the English poets John Cornford and Ralph Winston Fox. Dubliner Tommy Wood was killed at the age of 17. The English company of the 10th battalion lost 78 men out of 145. After the battle, André Marty ordered the detention of the commander of the French battalion of the Brigade, Gaston Delasalle. Delasalle was accused of incompetence, cowardice and of being a fascist spy, and executed by firing squad.

== See also ==
- List of Spanish Republican military equipment of the Spanish Civil War
- List of Spanish Nationalist military equipment of the Spanish Civil War

== Bibliography ==
- Beevor, Antony. (2006). The Battle for Spain. The Spanish Civil War, 1936–1939. Penguin Books. London. ISBN 978-0-14-303765-1.
- Thomas, Hugh. (2001). The Spanish Civil War. Penguin Books. London. ISBN 978-0-14-101161-5.
