= List of Spanish Nationalist military equipment of the Spanish Civil War =

This is a list of all military equipment used by the nationalists during the Spanish Civil War.

== Weapons ==
- List of Spanish Civil War weapons of the Nationals

== Aircraft ==
- List of aircraft of National Spain in the Spanish Civil War

== Ships ==
- List of Classes of Spanish National ships of the Spanish Civil War
