= XIV International Brigade =

XIV International Brigade La Marseillaise
- Active: 1936–1939
- Country: Mostly France and Belgium
- Allegiance: Spain
- Branch: International Brigades
- Type: Mixed Brigade - Infantry
- Role: Home Defence
- Part of: 35th Division (1937-1938); 45th Division (1938)
- Garrison/HQ: Albacete
- Nickname: La Marsellesa
- Engagements: Spanish Civil War: Battle of Lopera; Second Battle of the Corunna Road; Battle of Jarama; Segovia Offensive; Aragon Withdrawal; Battle of the Ebro

Commanders
- Notable commanders: General Walter; Jules Dumont; Joseph Putz

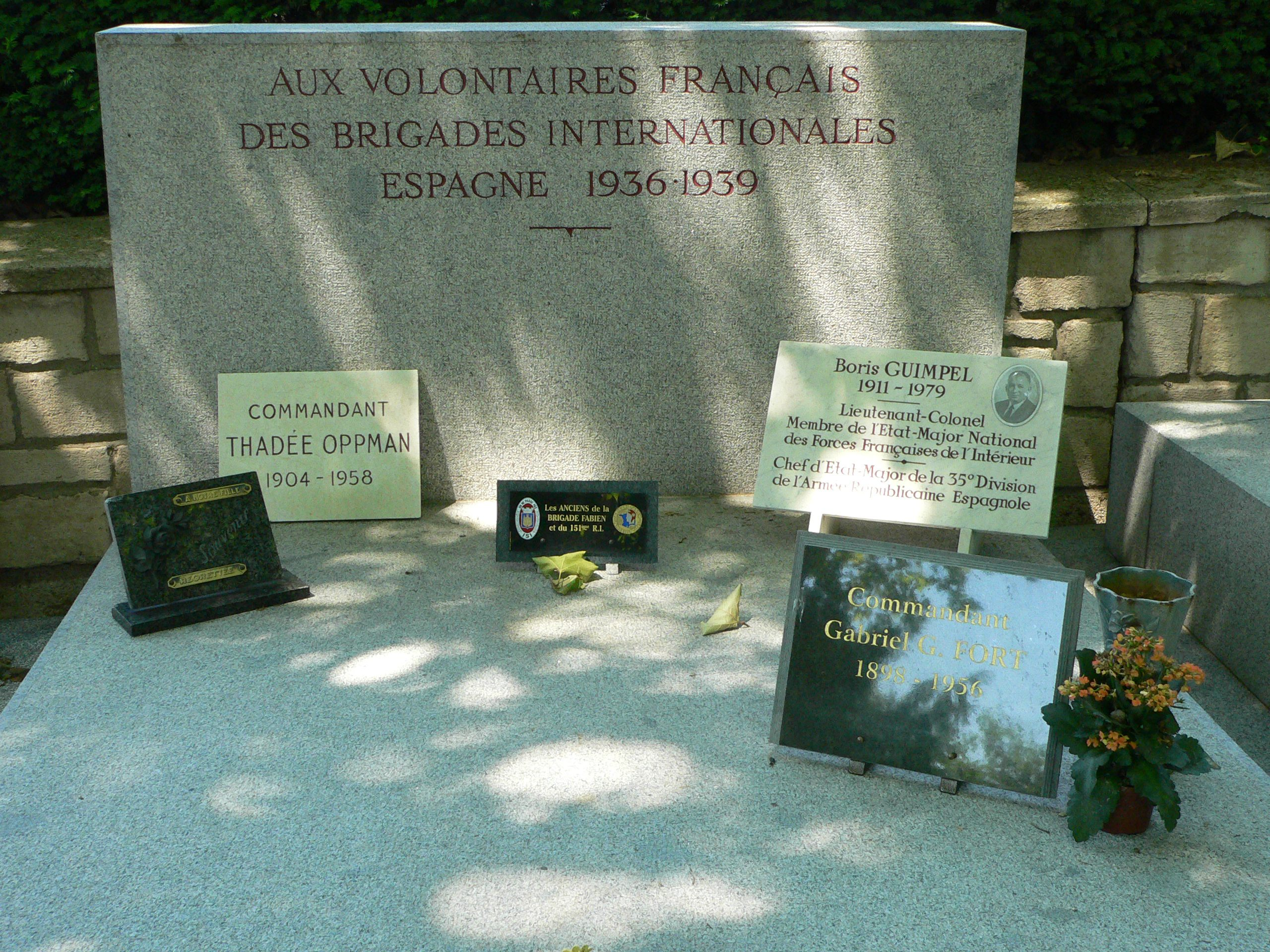
A memorial commemorating the International Brigades

The XIV International Brigade was one of several international brigades that fought for the Spanish Second Republic during the Spanish Civil War.

== History and structure ==
It was raised on 20 December 1936 with volunteers mainly from France and Belgium, under General "Walter" (Karol Świerczewski). This Brigade was the fourth of the international brigades, and it mixed veterans with new, idealistic volunteers. It was formally named the Marseillaise Brigade, after the French revolutionary song (and national anthem).

=== Units ===
With subsequent consolidations and reorganisations, the XIV International Brigade included, among others, the following battalions: all or elements of the following units:

- Commune de Paris Battalion
- Domingo Germinal Battalion
- Henri Barbusse Battalion
- Louise Michel (I) Battalion
- Louise Michel (II) Battalion
- Marsellaise Battalion
- Pierre Brachet Battalion
- Primera Unidad de Avance Battalion
- Nine Nations Battalion ("Sans nom" or "Neuf Nationalités")
- Sixth of February Battalion (Franco-Belgian)
- Vaillant-Couturier Battalion

=== Engagements ===
The brigade fought in the battles of Lopera, the Corunna Road, Jarama, and the Segovia Offensive.

After the Nationalist strategic victory in the Battle of Brunete (6–25 July 1937), heavy losses reduced the brigade strength from four to two battalions. However, the brigade lived on and was able to take part in the last Republican offensive of the war. As with all of the volunteer international brigades, the members of the XIV International Brigade faced a dark future after the eventual Nationalist victory.

== See also ==
- International Brigades
