= Carritt family =

English political family in Oxford, United Kingdom

The Carritt family
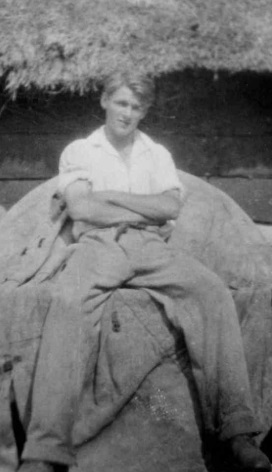
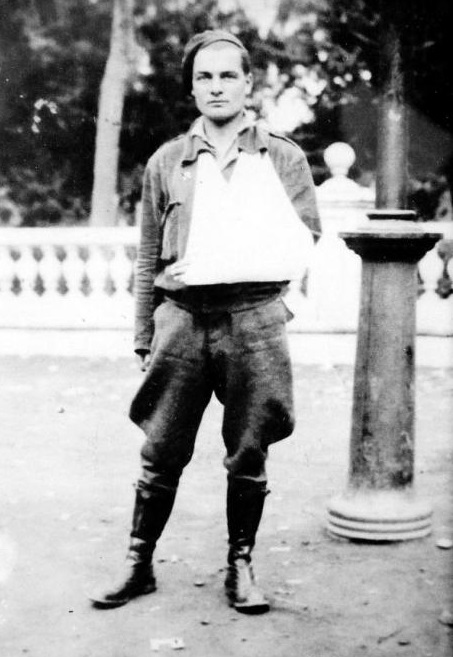
- Clockwise from top left: Anti-fascist Anthony Carritt; Communist revolutionary Noel Carritt
- Country: United Kingdom
- Current region: Oxfordshire
- Origin: Boars Hill, Oxfordshire
- Current head: Colin Carritt
- Members: Anthony Carritt Edgar Frederick Carritt; Michael Carritt; Liesel Carritt; Noel Carritt; Colin Carritt; Brian Carritt; Bill Carritt Winifred Carritt
- Traditions: Communist and left-wing political activism

The Carritt family is an English political family based in Oxford, known for its involvement in anti-fascist activism, Marxist politics, and academic achievements within Oxford University. For much of the 20th century, the involvement of the family revolved around the Communist Party of Great Britain, as various members have traditionally been members of the British communist movement and have served as notable anti-fascist and anti-colonial activists, spies, philosophers, professors, politicians, newspaper editors, and revolutionaries.

The Carritt family's home in Boars Hill became known as a hub for left-wing intellectual debate, attracting a wide number of people including communist trade union leader Abraham Lazarus, multiple Labour Party politicians including Dick Crossman, the novelist Iris Murdoch, and numerous poets including WH Auden and Stephen Spender. The Carritt family were also friends with another family of left-wing activists which lived close to them called the Thompsons, whose members included the historian E. P. Thompson and his brother Frank Thompson. The children of both families attended Dragon School together.

During the early 1930s, the family welcomed and financially supported Jewish refugees arriving in Oxford following the rise of Nazi Germany. Some Carritts also agreed to enter into marriage of conveniences to stop Jewish refugees from being forcefully deported back to Nazi Germany. One of these refugees who married into the Carritt family was the communist revolutionary Liesel Carritt, whose father was the former editor of Weimar Germany's main liberal newspaper the Frankfurter Zeitung.

Three members of the family, Noel Carritt, Anthony Carritt, and Liesel Carritt, all joined the International Brigades and fought battles against fascist forces during the Spanish Civil War. After Anthony was reported as missing, Noel spent days searching for him before being forced to conclude that he had been killed by fascist forces.

Colin Carritt led the successful campaign to create and erect the Oxford Spanish Civil War memorial in 2017, the first memorial to the Spanish Civil War erected in Oxford.

== Notable members ==
- Anthony Carritt – Member of the International Brigades, died while fighting against fascist forces alongside his brother Noel Carritt and sister-in-law Liesel Carritt.
- Noel Carritt – Communist revolutionary and member of the International Brigades, revolutionary, teacher, trade union leader, and ambulance driver during the Spanish Civil War.
- Liesel Carritt – Communist revolutionary and German-Jewish refugee who married into the Carritt family to avoid being deported to Nazi Germany, later fought for the International Brigades during the Spanish Civil War.
- Michael Carritt – Communist activist and university lecturer at Queen's College and the University of Brighton, spied for Indian republicans during the British occupation of India, and campaigned for those involved in the Drigh Road RAF Mutiny.
- Edgar Frederick Carritt – English philosopher and an Oxford University professor based in University College.
- Bill (Gabriel) Carritt – Communist activist and Christ Church scholar and university lecturer, campaigner for the Scottsboro Boys, was tried and found guilty at the Old Bailey in 1946 of leading a campaign to illegally house homeless families in luxury flats following WWII.
- Brian Carritt – Communist activist, known for helping hunger marchers during his time at Eton College, and was friends with Olympic gold medalist and anti-fascist revolutionary Lewis Clive.
- Winfred Carritt – Communist activist who helped to shelter refugees who fled the Spanish Civil War.
- Colin Carritt – Leader of a successful campaign to build Oxford's first memorial to the Spanish Civil War, the result of which was the Oxford Spanish Civil War memorial.

== See also ==
- October Club
- Ruskin College
- Battle of Carfax
- Thora Silverthorne
- Ralph Winston Fox
