= Liesel Carritt =

German teacher

- Born: Liesel Mottek; 1913; Germany
- Died: 1982 (aged 68–69); East Germany
- Occupations: Teacher, translator, soldier
- Organization: International brigades
- Known for: Anti-fascist, communist revolutionary
- Political party: Communist Party of Great Britain
- Spouse: Noel Carritt (1933-1941)
- Father: Heinrik (Heinz) Mottek
- Family: Carritt family

Liesel Carritt (née Mottek; 20 October 1913 – 13 September 1982) was a German teacher, translator, refugee, and later a communist revolutionary who fought against fascism alongside the International Brigades during the Spanish Civil War. As a teenager, Liesel and her German-Jewish family fled the Nazis and came to Oxford, England, where local people rescued them by providing them with the necessary financial security to ensure that the British government would not deport them back into the hands of the Nazis. Her father was the former senior editor of Weimar Germany's main liberal newspaper, the Frankfurter Zeitung.

In 1933 Liesel entered into a marriage of convenience with a fellow communist activist called Noel Carritt. Noel was the son of the Oxford University professor Edgar Carritt and a member of the famous Oxford based Carritt family, notable for its Marxist and anti-fascist politics. Come the beginning of the Spanish Civil War, Liesel, her husband Noel, and her brother in-law Anthony Carritt, all joined the International Brigades and fought against fascist forces led by Francisco Franco and backed by Hitler and Mussolini. At first she fought as a soldier on the frontlines before the government decided to bar women from being frontline soldiers, so she instead became a language translator.

She spent her remaining years in East Germany as a teacher and an interpreter. Historians have suggested that throughout her life she suffered multiple episodes of mental illness. The exact details of her life are still the subject of inquiry by historians, with most details on her life only being discovered in the late 2010s and early 2020s.

== Early life and family ==
Liesel Carritt was born under the name Liesel Mottek into a large German-Jewish family. Her father was a journalist called Heinrik (Heinz) Mottek who was the former editor of Weimar Germany's main liberal newspaper, the Frankfurter Zeitung. During her teenager years Liesel became a communist and joined the Communist Party of Germany.

== Fleeing Germany to England ==
In 1932 Liesel and her family came to Oxford in England to avoid being killed by the Nazis. Under the Aliens Act 1905 (which was designed to halt Jewish immigration), refugees were only allowed into the United Kingdom if they could ensure their financial stability and that they would not be a burden on the government. This guarantee of financial surety was provided to the Mottek family by a doctor living in north Oxford's Summertown. Later the Mottek family would receive financial support from Edgar Carritt of the Oxford-based Carritt family, whose members lived in Boars Hill and were known for their pro-communist and anti-fascist politics.

However, despite being accepted by a local doctor and the Carritt family, the Mottek family did not receive a universally positive welcome from Oxford's residents. Unknown people painted Nazi swastikas on the front-door where Liesel's father lived.

== Marriage to Noel Carritt ==
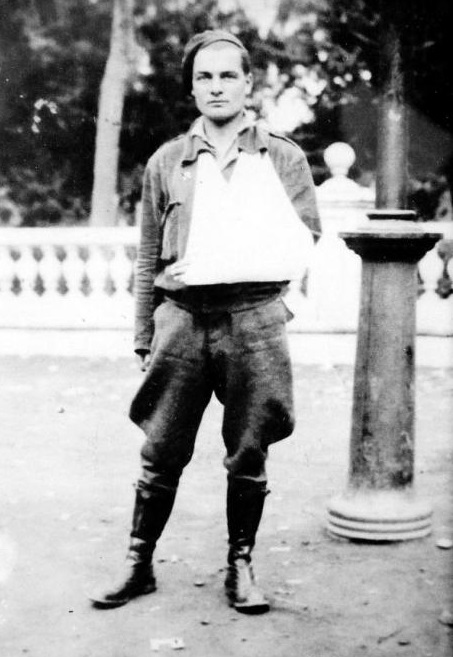
Liesel's husband Noel Carritt, photographed after being injured during the Spanish Civil War

Liesel's openly pro-communist beliefs and her membership of the Communist Party of Germany put her at a far greater risk of being deported by the British government to Germany and into the hands of the Nazis. To avoid being deported to Nazi Germany, Liesel Carritt married another young communist activist called Noel Carritt, who also belonged to the same family that had been financially supporting Liesel and her relatives. Although the marriage could constitute as a marriage of convenience, it does appear as though the couple had a romantic attraction during the early years of the marriage. Liesel married Noel in 1933 when Liesel was 19 and Noel was 21.

In the summer of 1935 Liesel and Noel joined a group of left-wing students to travel to the Soviet Union departing to Leningrad from London on 11 August aboard a Russian ship called "Smolny". A copy of the list of passengers was obtained by MI5 on 13 August. After returning to the UK, Noel became a teacher in Sheffield and it is believed that Liesel may have joined him there.

== Spanish Civil War ==
In 1936 the Spanish military under the leadership of fascist leader Francisco Franco, and with support from Adolf Hitler and Benito Mussolini, started a war known as the Spanish Civil War (1936-1939) in an attempt to overthrow the Spanish republican government. To help fight Franco, the International Brigades were created to recruit anti-fascist volunteers from across the world to fight against fascism and help defend the Spanish republican government.

In 1936 Liesel travelled to Spain to help defend the republican government against fascist forces. Arriving before the International Brigades had been fully formed, she joined a republican militia and fought as a soldier on the frontlines against fascist forces near Aragon alongside the Thälmann Group. After the International Brigades were founded it was decided by the Spanish government that women should not fight on the frontlines, so Liesel instead became a translator and worked in various administrator roles.

Later Liesel's husband Noel and his brother Anthony Carritt would join them, although Anthony would not survive the war. Liesel and Noel would not often cross paths during the war and their relationship drifted apart while remaining on friendly terms. During the war Liesel begun a romantic affair with commander Dave Springhall, who was later arrested by the British and charged with espionage. When Liesel went on leave to Barcelona without permission, Noel wrote to International Brigade authorities asking for leniency, which appears to have worked as Liesel was not punished.

== Later life ==
Liesel returned to Britain after serving the International Brigades in Spain, although the exact details of her life after the war are not as well documented. In 1941 Liesel and Noel Carritt divorced each other, and Noel who went onto marry another woman later the same year. In 1947 Liesel married Norman Hidden; the relationship failed to last.

After the end of the Second World War, Liesel moved to Leipzig in East Germany where she would spend the rest of her life working as an interpreter and a teacher. For unknown reasons, she was barred from joining the East German communist party, something which greatly disappointed her. Evidence also suggests that she suffered from multiple episodes of mental illness.

== Legacy ==
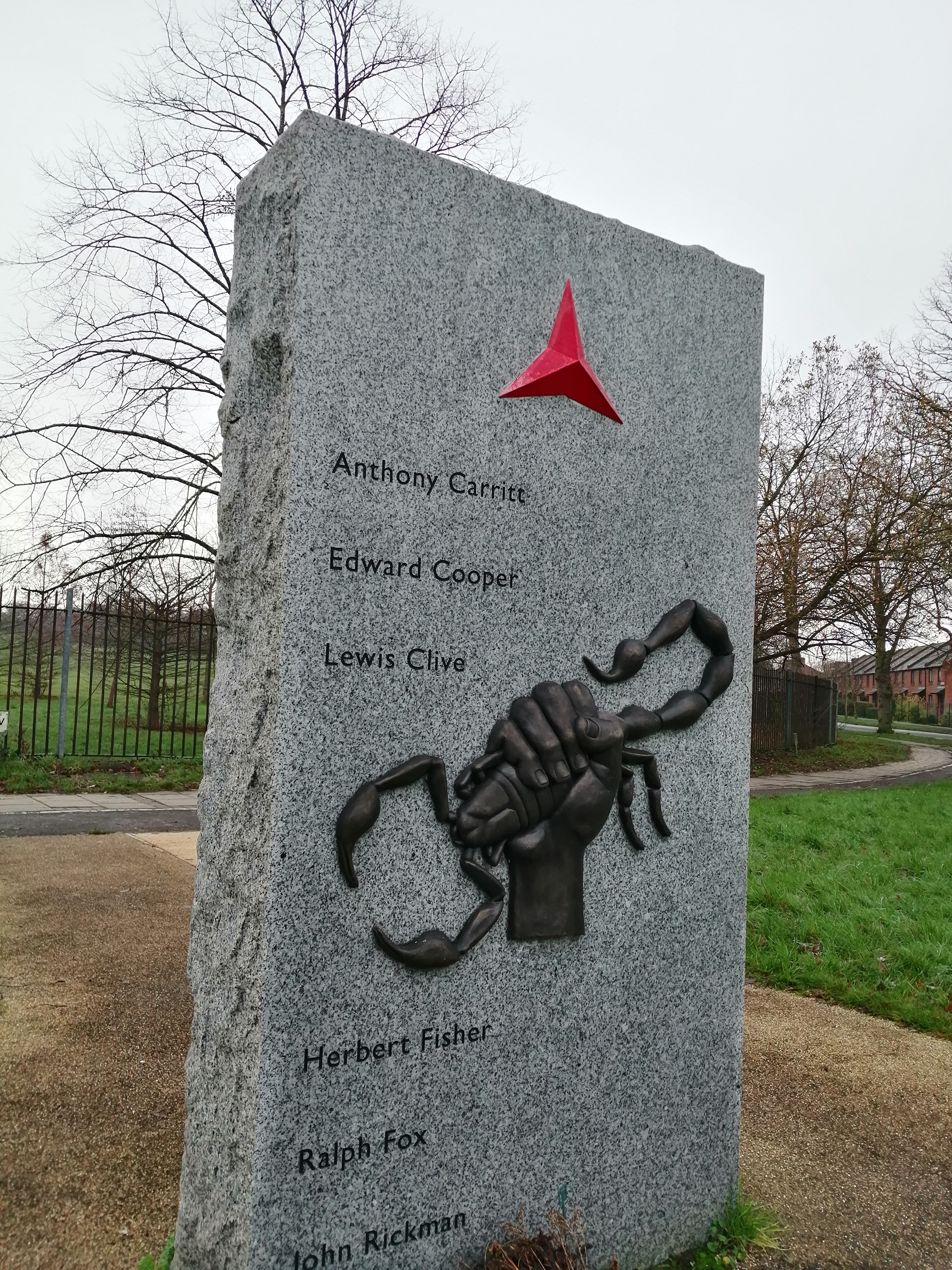
Photograph of the Oxford Spanish Civil War memorial

During the early 2010s historians attempted to identify as many people as they could with links to Oxfordshire who fought against fascism during the Spanish Civil War. The result was the book No Other Way which identified 31 such people with links to Oxfordshire, and the profits of the book went towards funding the creation of the Oxford Spanish Civil War memorial. The campaign was led by Noel Carritt's son Collin Carritt. However Liesel Carritt was not among the 31 identified volunteers. A correction was then uploaded to the website of the Oxford International Brigade Memorial Committee which included a small biography of Liesel among the other known volunteers.

== See also ==
- Michael Carritt
- Battle of Carfax
- Abraham Lazarus
- Thora Silverthorne
- No Other Way
