= Oxford Spanish Civil War memorial =

War memorial in Oxford, England

- Oxford, England
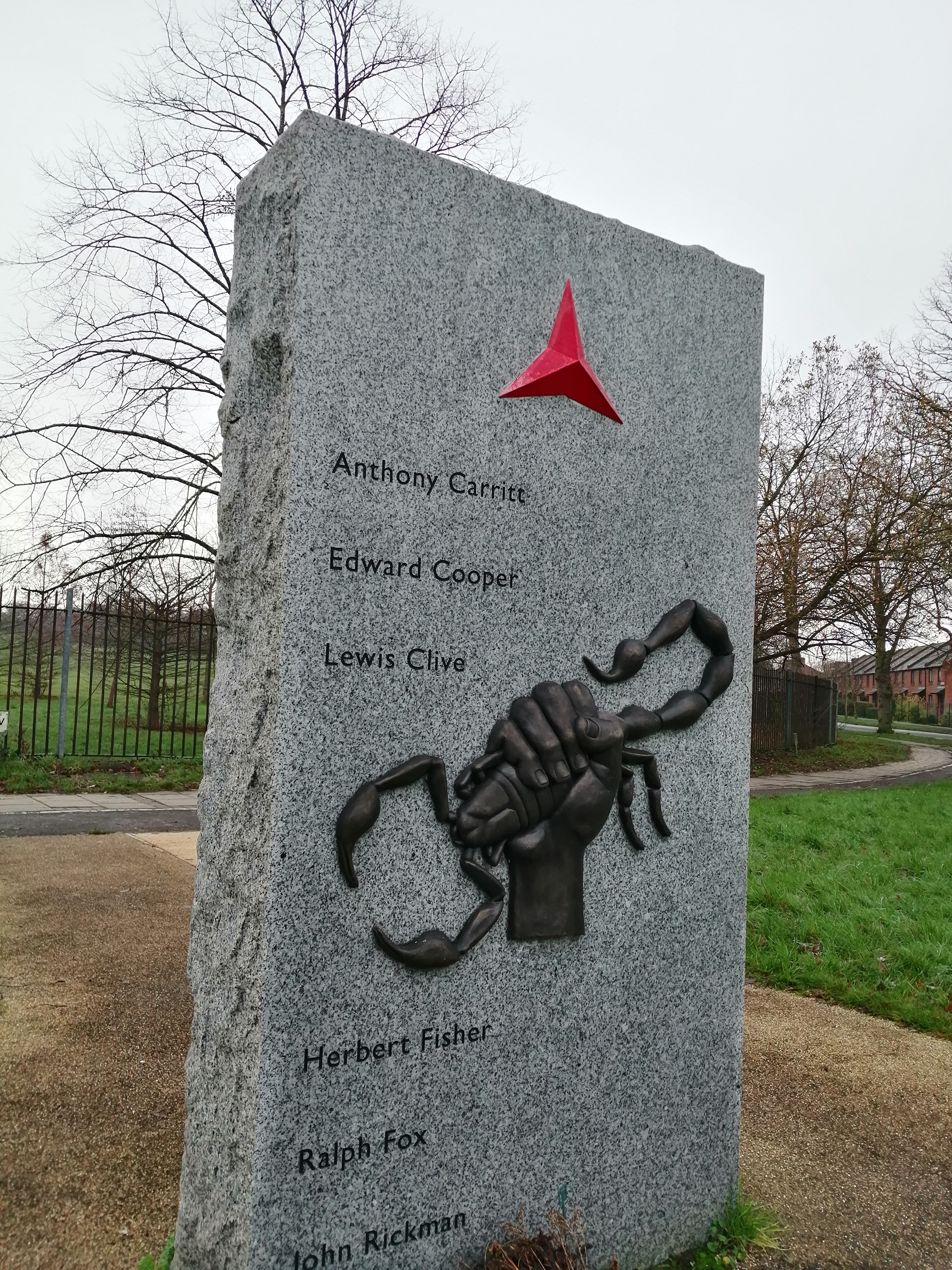
- For International Brigades
- Unveiled: 10 June 2017
- Location: 51°45′4.81″N 01°14′14.73″W; East Oxford, Headington Hill
- Designed by: Charlie Carter

Burials by war
- Spanish Civil War
- "In memory of the 31 men and women of Oxfordshire who defended democracy and fought fascism in the Spanish Civil War of 1936 to 1939 and the people of the County who gave them support. Six were killed in action. 'We came because our open eyes could see no other way.' C Day Lewis"

The Oxford Spanish Civil War memorial is a monument in Oxford dedicated to the 31 known local residents who fought on the Republican side of the Spanish Civil War (1936–1939) against Nationalist forces. Erected and unveiled in 2017, the memorial is located close to South Park, near the base of Headington Hill by the junction of Headington Road and Morrell Avenue. The memorial is dedicated to all the volunteers with links to Oxfordshire who supported the Republicans and inscribed onto the front are the names of the six volunteers in the International Brigades who were killed during the war.

Although the memorial was dedicated to 31 local people who fought in Spain, historians have since discovered two more. One of them was Charlie Hutchison, the only known black man among the approximate 2,500 antifascist volunteers from the British Isles, and the other a German-Jewish refugee called Liesel Carritt.

== Commemorated dead ==
On the front of the memorial, the names of the six killed are inscribed:

- Anthony Carritt (1914–1937) – Member of the famous Carritt family and brother of the communist revolutionaries Michael Carritt, Bill Carritt, and Noel Carritt.
- Lewis Clive (1910–1938) – Olympic gold winner in rowing and Christ Church graduate.
- Edward Cooper (1912–1937) – Communist Party (CPGB) activist and worker for the Daily Worker.
- Herbert Fisher (1910–1938) – Relative of Virginia Woolf and Ralph Vaughan Williams.
- Ralph Winston Fox (1900–1936) – Communist Party (CPGB) activist, linguist, biographer of Lenin and Genghis Khan, and Magdalen College graduate.
- John Rickman (1910–1937) – Communist Party (CPGB) anti-poverty campaigner, and expert on church architecture.

== Background ==
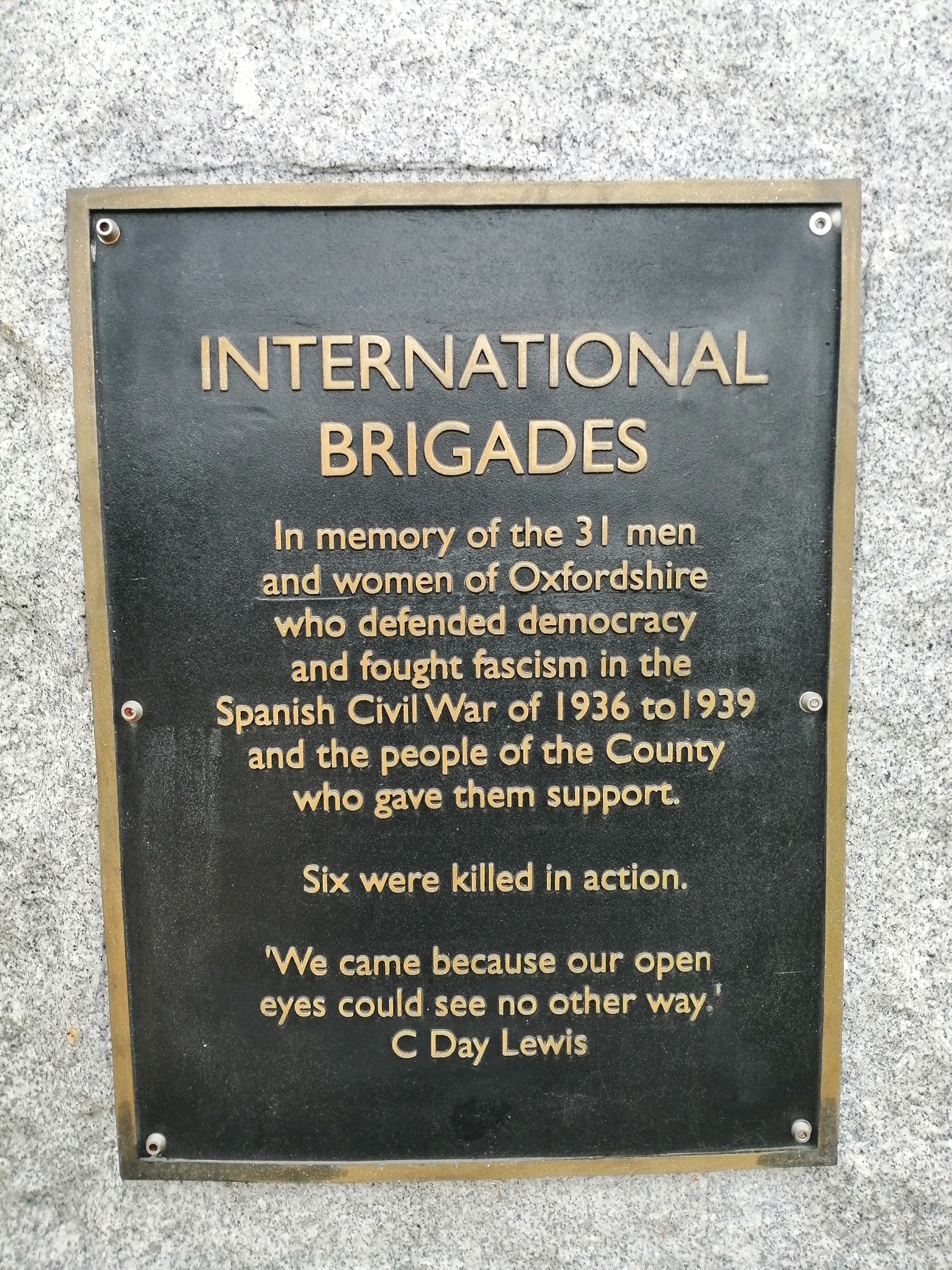

During the Spanish Civil War, 29 British people with connections to Oxfordshire joined the International Brigades, with two others joining POUM. Most of the volunteers were communist activists, and many had links to Britain's Jewish communities. Alongside organisations raising funds for Spanish humanitarian causes, Oxford was a hub for anti-fascist activism, homes within the county housed hundreds of Basque refugee children. Various physical fights broke out between anti-fascist activists and the Oxford University Fascist Association, with Communist Party of Great Britain (CPGB) activist Abe Lazarus successfully organising Oxford students to break up fascist meetings. Many of the local anti-fascist volunteers who survived and returned became influential in various professions including professors, surgeons, human rights activists and trade union leaders.

Oxfordshire was a hub for anti-fascist and Spanish Republican activism during the 1930s, with links to activists including; Olympic gold medalist Lewis Clive, founder of Britain's first union for working class nurses Thora Silverthorne, biographer of Lenin and Genghis Khan Ralph Winston Fox, photographer Alec Wainman, the only CPGB communist to sit in the House of Lords Baron Milford, Communist organiser and filmmaker Carl Marzani, Communist leader Claud Cockburn, Marxist historian Tom Wintringham, and journalist Giles Romilly.

== Names of volunteers with links to Oxfordshire ==
The six volunteers who died during the war are named on the front, however the monument was built to commemorate all 31 known volunteers with links to Oxfordshire. Since the monument's construction in 2017 two more historical figures have been discovered, including the German-Jewish refugee Liesel Carritt, and the black-British anti-fascist Charlie Hutchison.

- Alfred Smith
- Alec Wainman
- Anthony Carritt
- Carl Marzani
- Christopher Thornycroft
- Claud Cockburn
- Dorothy Collier
- Edward Henry Burke Cooper
- Gavin Henderson, 2nd Baron Faringdon
- George Orwell
- Giles Romilly
- Herbert Fisher
- James (Jim) Brewer
- John (Jock) Birrell
- John Montgomery
- John Rickman
- Kathleen McColgan
- Lewis Clive
- Michael (Mike) Wilton
- Murray Fuhrman
- Nathan Clark
- Noel Carritt
- Peter Ferguson
- Peter Harrisson
- Philip Norman
- Ralph Winston Fox
- Robert Wheeler
- Thora Silverthorne
- Tom Wintringham
- Victor Claridge
- Wogan Philipps, 2nd Baron Milford

== Planning and council conflict ==
In 2014 an appeal was launched to raise funds for a memorial to be built within Oxford to honour International Brigade volunteers with links to Oxfordshire. Much of the funding for the memorial was generated by the sale of the book No Other Way: Oxfordshire and the Spanish Civil War 1936–39, a compilation of research by several local historians with oversight from Oxford University professor Tom Buchanan. Other sources of funding included branches organisations including the Labour party, Green Party, Communist Party of Britain, National Union of Journalists, Unison, Trades Union Congress, and educational institutions including Ruskin College and The Queen's College.

The current location was settled on after Oxford City Council rejected two proposals: the first was for the monument to be erected in Bonn Square in the city centre, and the second, on a site adjacent to the main Oxford War Memorial near St Giles' Church. Liberal Democrat councillors opposed the suggested locations and the creation of the monument was also opposed by heritage groups, including the Oxford Preservation Trust because it was felt to be out of character with the surrounding conservation area and the London Place Residents' Association. The current placement of the memorial was the third proposed location. Some objected to the memorial because it did not honour "both sides... in a spirit of reconciliation and forgiveness", and called the design "aggressive towards the memory of the victims of conflict". Liberal Democrat councillor Elizabeth Wade opposed each proposed location for a monument in Oxford, although she claimed she was never opposed in principle. She described the second proposal on St Giles' near Oxford's First and Second World War memorials as “aggressive and triumphalist”. Describing herself as a historian and speaking to the Oxford Mail, she then opposed the third and current location because she believed a monument with a red flag would glorify communism, despite no red flag ever being proposed to appear on the monument. A writer in the communist Morning Star labelled opponents of the memorial as NIMBYs.

== See also ==
- Charlie Hutchison
- Battle of Carfax
- Carritt family
- Alec Wainman
