= Radcliffe Infirmary =

- Oxford Radcliffe Hospitals NHS Trust
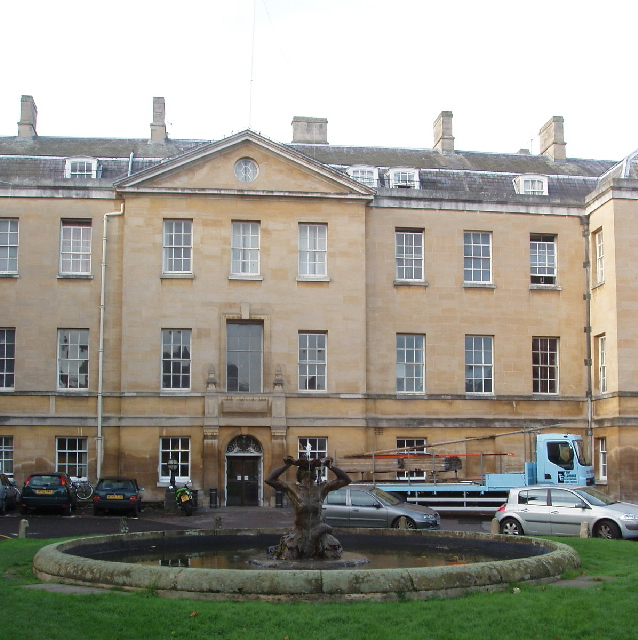

- Shown in Oxfordshire

Geography
- Location: Oxford, Oxfordshire, England, United Kingdom
- Coordinates: 51°45′37″N 1°15′43″W

Organisation
- Care system: Public NHS
- Type: General
- Affiliated university: University of Oxford

Services
- Emergency department: No Accident & Emergency
- Beds: 275

History
- Founded: 1770
- Closed: 2007

Links
- Website: oxfordradcliffe.nhs.uk
- Lists: Hospitals in England

The Radcliffe Infirmary was a hospital in central north Oxford, England, located at the southern end of Woodstock Road on the western side, backing onto Walton Street.

Closed in 2007, after refurbishment the building was re-opened in October 2012 for use by the Faculty of Philosophy and both the Philosophy and Theology libraries of the University of Oxford.

== History ==
The initial proposals to build a hospital in Oxford were put forward at a meeting of the Radcliffe Trustees, who were administering John Radcliffe's estate valued at £4,000, in 1758. The facility was constructed on land given by Thomas Rowney, one of the two members of parliament for Oxford. The foundation stone was laid on 27 August 1761 and the new facility was officially opened on 18 October 1770.

A fountain of the Greek god Triton was placed in front of the main infirmary building in 1858 and the Oxford Eye Hospital was established on the site in 1886.

During the First World War, part of the hospital was converted for military use as one of the many sections of the Third Southern General Hospital.

In 1936 the Radcliffe Infirmary treated four members of the British Union of Fascists following the Battle of Carfax.

A number of pioneering moments in medical history occurred at the hospital. Penicillin was first tested on patients on 27 January 1941 and the Nuffield Laboratory of Ophthalmology was founded on the site in 1942.

The entrance of the hospital was seen in the ITV television series Inspector Morse in 1991. The first Utah Array (later known as the BrainGate) implantation in a human (Kevin Warwick) took place on 14 March 2002.

After services had been transferred to purpose-built buildings at the John Radcliffe and Churchill Hospitals in nearby Headington, the infirmary closed for medical use in 2007. Following refurbishment, the infirmary building was re-opened in October 2012 for use by the Faculty of Philosophy and both the Philosophy and Theology libraries of the University of Oxford. The site, which is now known as the Radcliffe Observatory Quarter, also became home to the Blavatnik School of Government in 2012.

== Notable staff and students ==
- Agnes Jean Watt, Royal Red Cross (1859–1946) Matron from 1897 to 1921 reformed the nursing department and was also Principal Matron, TFNS, 3rd Southern General Hospital, Oxford, from 1909 to 1922. She was trained under Matron Eva Luckes, at The London Hospital between 1888 and 1890. Agnes worked as a sister for most of the next seven years at The London Hospital. Sydney Holland and Eva Luckes were determined that she should obtain the matron's position in Oxford.
- Thora Silverthorne trained as a nurse at the Radcliffe Infirmary, during which she earned the nickname "Red Silverthorne" for her Communist Party activism in the city of Oxford and for her membership of the October Club. Silverthorne volunteered as a nurse to serve hunger marchers passing through Oxford during the 1932 National Hunger March, an act of mercy she performed by "helping herself to bandages and dressings" from the Radcliffe Infirmary. Silverthorne used her medical training at the Radcliffe Infirmary to help create the first-ever foreign hospital to serve the International Brigades and the Spanish Republic. Later in life she created the UK's first union for rank and file nurses, the National Nurses Association.
- Theodora Turner (1907–1999) OBE, ARRC, student midwife from 1931 to 1933, subsequently Matron St. Thomas' Hospital London from 1955 to 1965 and President of the Royal College of Nursing from 1966 to 1968.

== See also ==
- List of hospitals in England
- John Radcliffe Hospital
