= Michael Carritt =

British communist supporter of Indian independence (1906–1990)

- Born: Michael John Carritt; 3 January 1906
- Died: 1990 (aged 83–84); Merton, near Bicester, Oxfordshire
- Other name: Bashir
- Education: Classics studies at Queens College, Oxford
- Occupations: Colonial official, university lecturer, tutor
- Employer: Indian Civil Service
- Known for: Spying on the British colonial authorities on behalf of the Communist Party of India
- Political party: Communist Party of Great Britain
- Relatives: Winifred Carritt (mother); Edgar Frederick Carritt (father); Noel Carritt (bBrother); Brian Carritt (brother); Bill Carritt (brother); Anthony Carritt (maternal half-brother); Liesel Carritt (sister in law); two biological sisters

Michael John Carritt (3 January 1906 – 1990) was a British communist revolutionary, spy, university lecturer, and a supporter of Indian independence. After graduating from Oxford University, Carritt joined the British Empire's Indian Civil Service. While working for the Civil Service, Carritt became a communist after witnessing the brutality of the British colonial occupation of India. Carritt became a double-agent for the Communist Party of India (CPI), secretly supplying them with information to help them resist British colonialism. After returning from India, he helped the Communist Party of Great Britain (CPGB) develop their policies concerning Indian independence. Over the course of his career he worked as an educator for the Workers Education Association in Brighton, Oxford University, and the University of Sussex.

== Early life, family and education ==
Michael Carritt was born on 3 January 1906. His mother Winifred Carritt was a communist activist, and his father Edgar Carritt was an Emeritus Professor of Philosophy at University College of Oxford University. Michael Carritt was 1 of 5 brothers, all of whom became socialist revolutionaries. Carritt also had 2 sisters, although neither are known to have joined the British communist movement like their brothers.

Michael Carritt was educated at a school in Sedbergh, Cumbria. As an adult he studied at Queen's College, of Oxford University, graduating with a degree in Classics. He took the Indian Civil Service (ICS) exam and passed in 1928, after a year of studying law.

== Spying in India ==
After gaining his degree from Oxford University, at the age of 25 Michael Carritt was given a job in Mumbai with the Indian Civil Service of the British colonial government in November 1930. He quickly came to love both India and the Indian people, describing the country and residents:

"I loved the Bengal countryside, whether it was the scorched, dusty, laterite upland of W Bengal… or the gentle evening light on the vast waterways of E Bengal. I came to love the Bengali people – nimble-witted and quick to laugh, but also easily moved to anger; warm in friendship but, more than most people, bitter in enmity..."

One of the driving forces behind his transformation into a communist revolutionary was witnessing the exploitation of Indians under British rule. Michael Carritt was an avid reader of Marxist literature, however the importing of books promoting communism were banned by the British by General Communist Notification of 1932 under the Sea Customs Act. Despite the ban, his brothers would find ways to send him works by Karl Marx and Vladimir Lenin. While working in India he made contact with the Indian Communist Party and began secretly supporting the communists, and the larger pro-independence movement to which they belonged. Eventually Michael Carritt was promoted to the position of Special Officer in the Political Department of Government in Calcutta, where he often held meetings with communist activists in the city's open parks. In 1934 his commitment to the Indian communist and pro-independence movements deepened and he briefly returned to England to meet with the League against Imperialism who gave him activist contacts in India and instructions on how to support them. He was also given money by the CPGB to send to support Indian communists.

Michael Carritt was again promoted within the ranks of the British colonial government, being made the Under Secretary to the Chief Secretary in the Political and Appointments Department. This department was responsible for decoding and coding classified sent between Delhi and London, with the intention of monitoring for political subversion against the British Empire and looking for political suspects. Michael Carritt used this position to warn anti-colonial activists when their cover had been blown or if any information about themselves had been compromised.

One of Michael Carritt's main political contacts within the Indian communist movement was PC Joshi, the leader of the Indian Communist Party. Joshi moved into Michael Carritt's home which he used as a safe house, and Joshi often posed as Carritt's "personal bodyguard" to hide his true identity as a communist revolutionary. Using diplomatic channels, Michael Carritt was able to import into India large quantities of banned nationalist literature, and became an associate of Indian communist A.K. (Ajoy)Ghosh. In 1938 Michael resigned this role as an agent for Indian communists, fearing that he would soon be caught and believing there was not much more he could contribute, and left the Indian Civil Service in 1939.

== Return to Britain ==
After leaving India and returning to Britain, Michael Carritt became an active member of the Bradford branch of the Communist Party of Great Britain (CPGB), and assisted the British communist revolutionary and expert on Indian affairs Benjamin Francis Bradley (aka Ben Bradley) in formulating the CPGB's policy on India. As the British communists were the only major movement within Britain that opposed British rule in India, it was a home to many Indian republicans. During the World War II, Michael Carritt helped develop a group of Indian communist students living in Britain, and continued to write about India until its independence from the British Empire. During the Second World War, Michael Carritt teamed up with John Saville to campaign in support of Arthur Atwood and other people involved in the Drigh Road RAF Mutiny.

During the 1950s Michael taught philosophy for the Workers Education Association in Brighton, and later that decade became a tutor/lecturer in philosophy at Oxford. Near the end of his career he was a lecturer in the Center for Continuing Education at the University of Sussex.

In 1980 Michael Carritt was contacted by researchers who wanted to know more about his time in India, and it was discovered that the British Empire had suspected him of being sympathetic with the Indian liberation struggle.

In 1986 Michael Carritt's autobiography was published, titled A mole in the crown: Memoires of a British official in India who worked with the communist underground in the 1930s.

== Death ==
Michael Carritt died in 1990 at the age of 84, in Merton near Bicester, Oxfordshire. However some sources say he died in Ploughley. Archival material relating to Michael Carritt can be found in the British Library collections. Indian Political Intelligence files of the India Office Collection, contain the following: Carritt's pension was withdrawn in 1940 after his retirement for his political conviction termed as 'grave misconduct'. In 1940, some documents were found in a trunk at Berkshire, buried in the garden of his father Professor E. F. Carritt, MA, Fellow of University College, Oxford. According to British intelligence officials the contents obviously belonged to Michael Carritt and were linked to his time in the ICS. Some of the captured documents apparently revealed he was working with Central Committee members of the CPI from 1936. Articles written from a communist viewpoint while still serving as an ICS officer in Bengal were interpreted as suitably incriminating. He was not arrested even though this was seriously considered for a while. The ensuing controversy and public face loss would have been too much for the British establishment while it was negotiating an exit out of India.

== See also ==
- Thora Silverthorne
- Abraham Lazarus
- October Club (Oxford University)
- Oxford Spanish Civil War memorial
