= Arthur Dukinfield Darbishire =

British zoologist and geneticist (1879–1915)

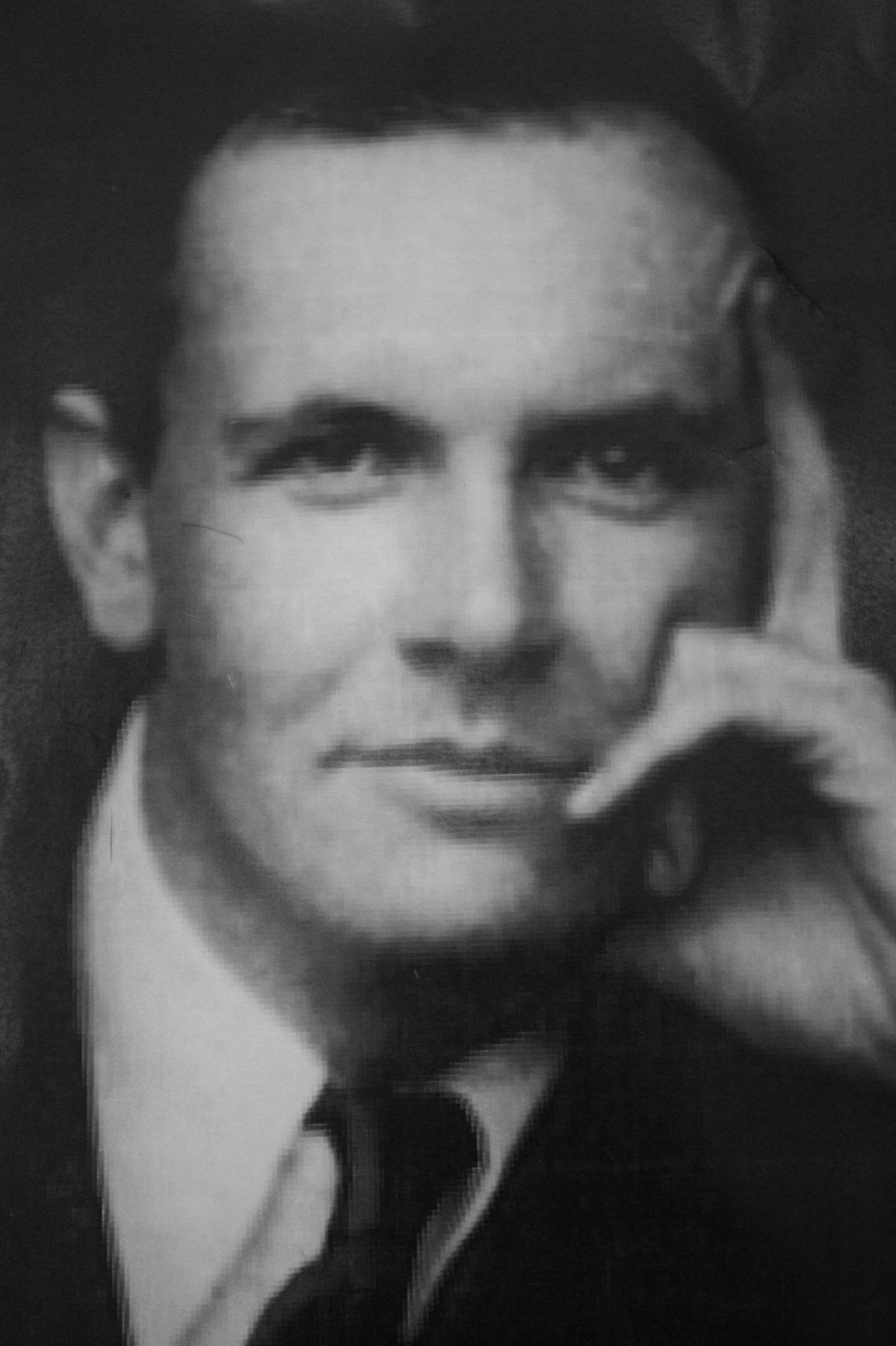
Dukinfield Darbishire in 1911

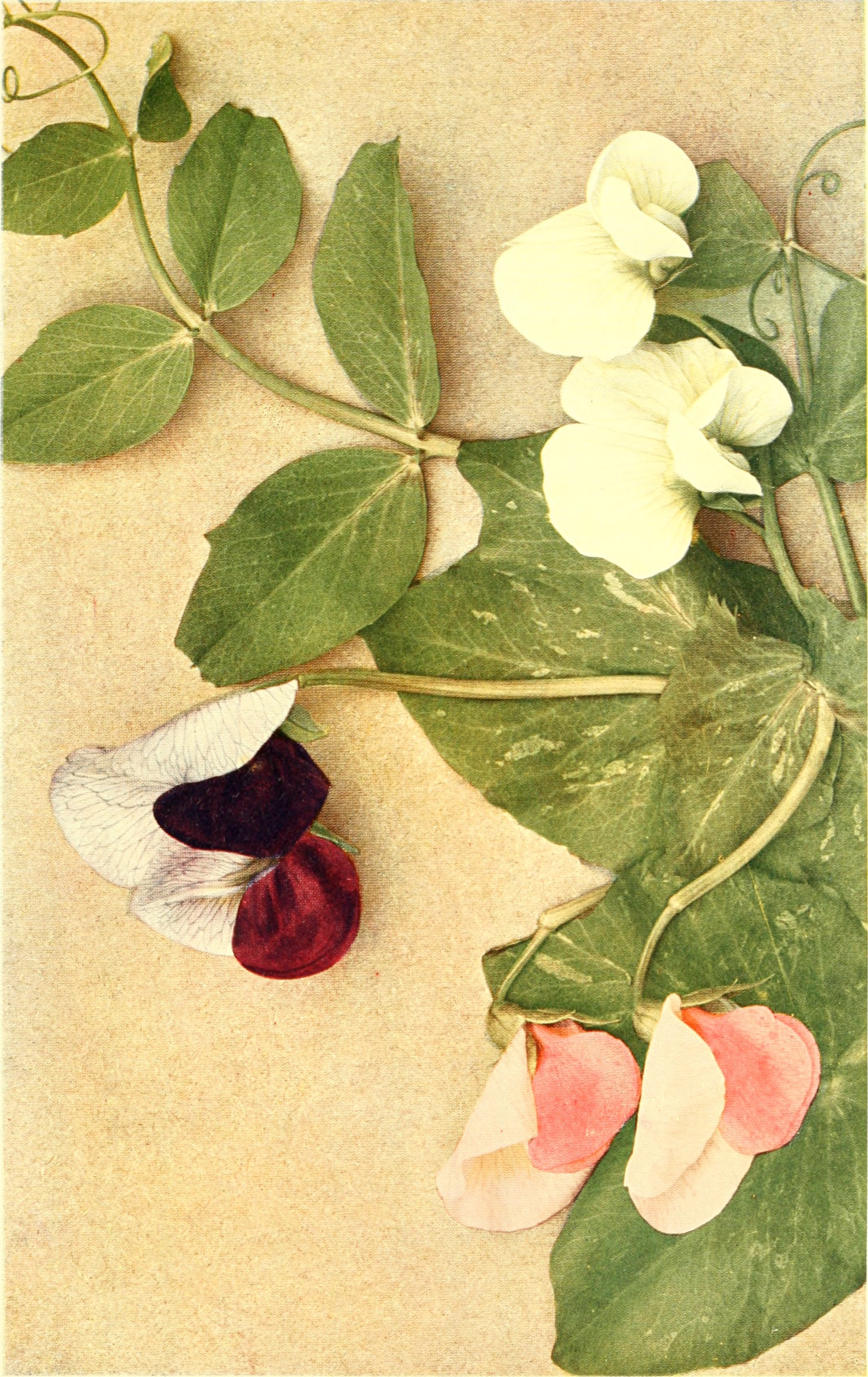
Plate from Breeding and the Mendelian Discovery, by A.D. Darbishire)

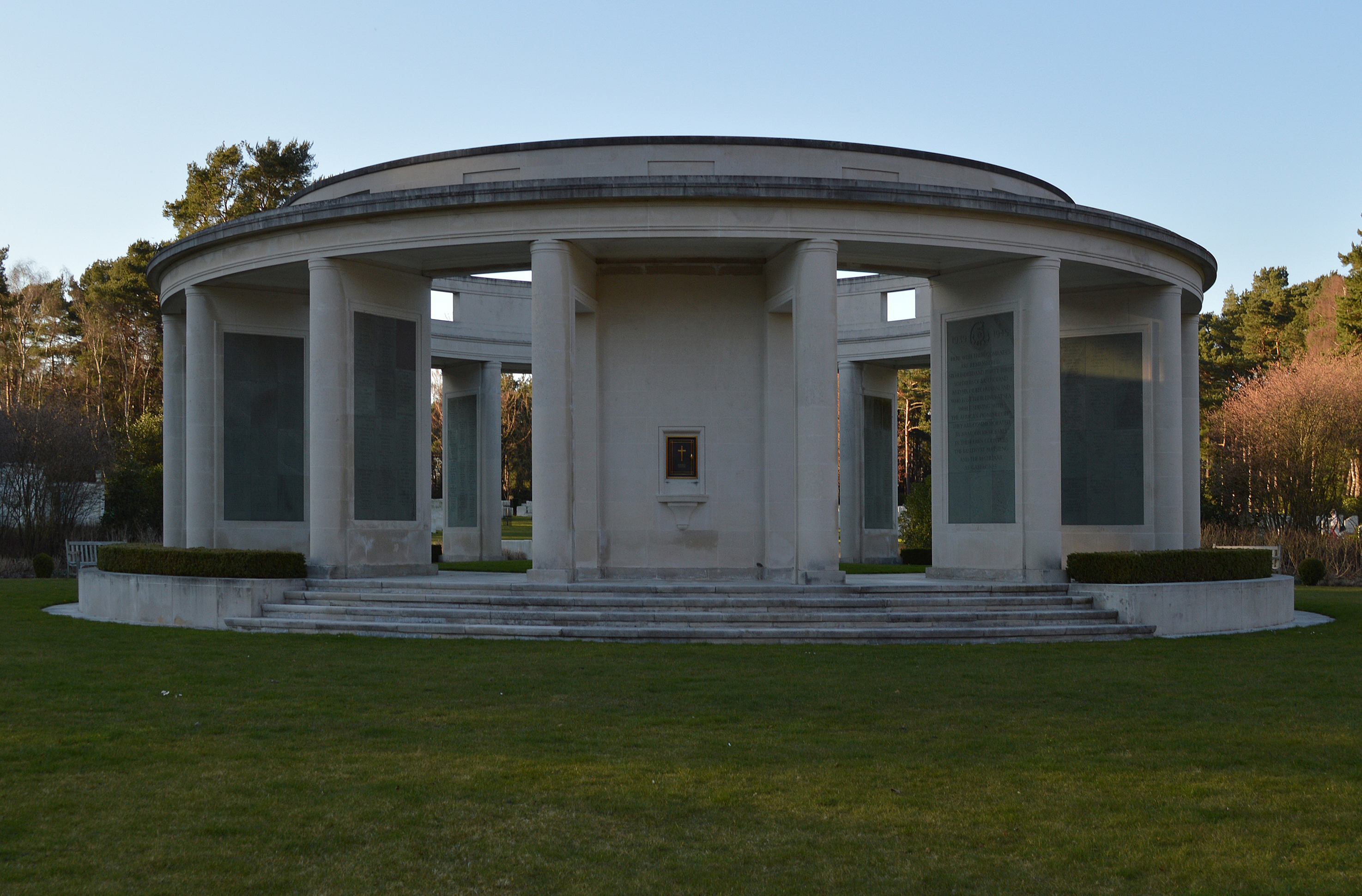
Darbishire's name is listed on panel 3 of the Brookwood Memorial

Arthur Dukinfield Darbishire FRSE (14 February 1879 – 26 December 1915) was a short-lived but influential British zoologist and geneticist. He was the first person to lecture in Genetics in the UK. He caused a stir in the world of genetics in the early 20th century in the debate over theory, sometimes referred to as The Mendel Wars.

From 1901 he conducted a series of experiments (working under Raphael Weldon) on the hybridisation of mice in the laboratory.

He was author of the highly influential book Breeding and the Mendelian Discovery.

== Life ==
He was born in Kensington in London on 14 February 1879, the son of Florence Eckersley (1848–1917) and Dr Samuel Dukinfield Darbishire (1846–1892). Soon the family moved to Oxford, where his father was appointed Physician at the Radcliffe Infirmary. In 1881, the family are listed as living at 15 New Inn Hall Street with four servants. In 1888 his father took early retirement on health grounds and the family moved to Plas Mawr in Wales. However, the family returned to Oxford following his father’s premature death in 1892. Having suffered from rheumatic fever, as a child Arthur was considered unsuitable for boarding school and was taught locally at Magdalen College School before attending the University of Oxford.

He graduated with an MA in Natural Sciences and Zoology from Balliol College, Oxford in 1902. He stayed on to act as Demonstrator in Zoology at the College. In 1911, he became Lecturer in Genetics at the University of Edinburgh and in July 1912 was elected a Fellow of the Royal Society of Edinburgh. His proposers were James Cossar Ewart, James Hartley Ashworth, Sir James Anderson Scott Watson and Ramsay Heatley Traquair. While in Edinburgh he was greatly influenced by Henri Louis Bergson who was visiting to give the Gifford Lectures in the spring of 1914.

His career was cut short by the First World War. In 1914 he was lecturing in Genetics at the School of Agriculture in Columbia, Missouri. He was unable to accept either of the two offers of professorships while in the United States, and instead returned to Britain at the outbreak of war. At first he was declared unfit for active service due to his physical condition, and was given a posting at munitions production. Not enjoying his alternative posting, he persevered and was eventually accepted as a private into the Argyll and Sutherland Highlanders in July 1915. He became seriously ill during training at Gailes Training Camp near London.

== Death ==
He was taken ill with cerebral meningitis on Christmas Day 1915 and died on the morning of 26 December. He was gazetted as a second lieutenant in the Royal Garrison Artillery on 28 December 1915, two days after his death. His name appears on the Roll of Honour in Sunningwell Village Hall. He is also named on the war memorials for Balliol College, the University of Edinburgh and the University of Manchester.

== Family ==
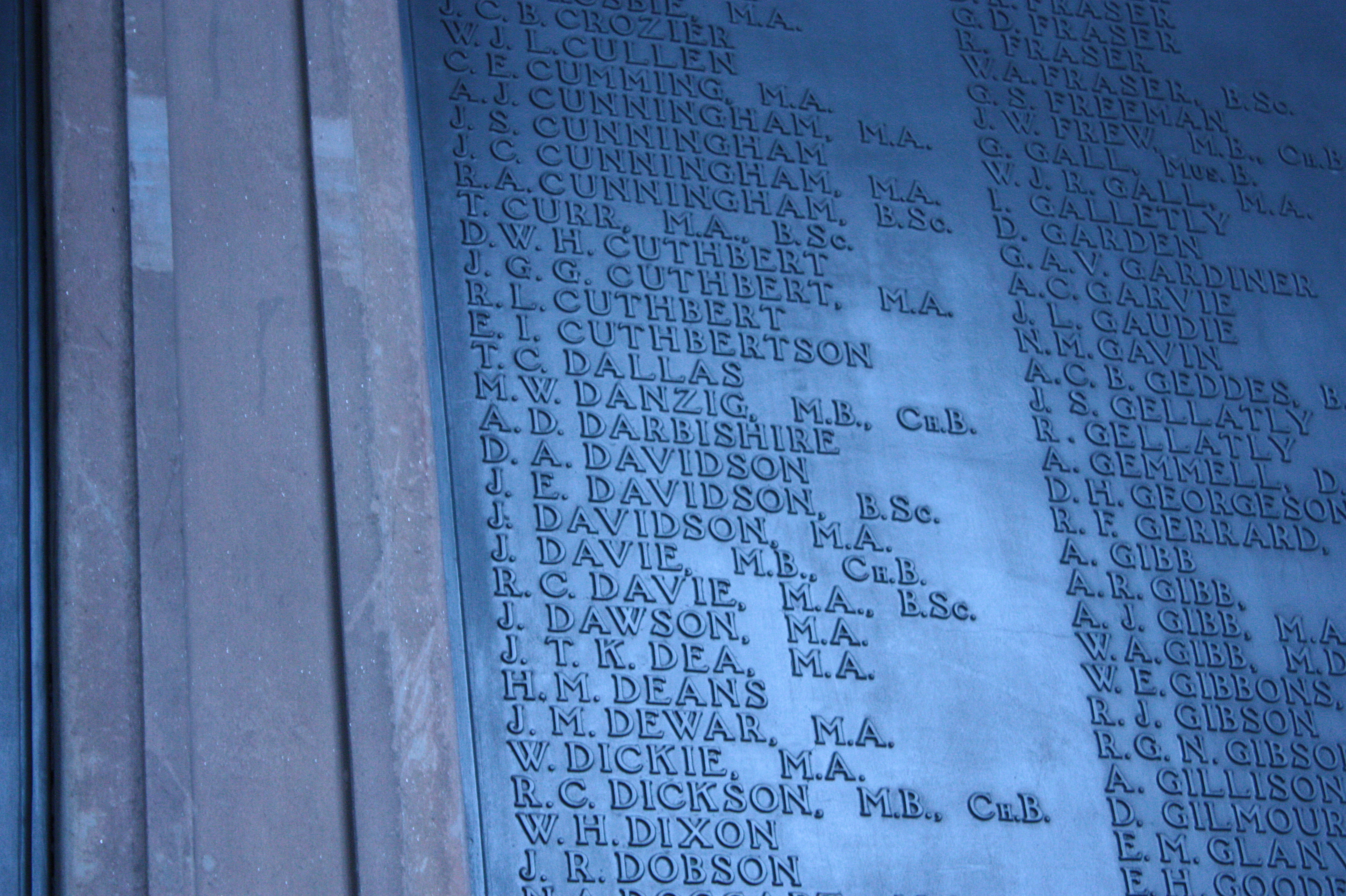
Darbishire's name on the University of Edinburgh War Memorial

Although Darbishire never married, he allegedly had a child by Mrs Winifred Carritt, wife of Prof Edgar Carritt of University College, London. Anthony Carritt was raised as the professor's son. Shortly after being told of his true father, Carritt joined the volunteers in the Spanish Civil War with his brother, Noel Carritt. Anthony Carritt was killed at the Battle of Brunete in 1937.

His sister Helen Darbishire (1881–1961) was Principal of Somerville College in Oxford. His cousin, Bernhard Vernon Darbishire (died 1935), was a minor war poet. His uncle, Robert Dukinfield Darbishire, was a prominent Manchester lawyer who founded the Whitworth Art Gallery in Manchester.

== Publications ==
- On the Bearing of Mendelian Principles of Heredity on Current Theories of the Origin of Species (1904)
- On the supposed Antagonism of Mendelian to Biometric Theories of Heredity (1905)
- The Mutation Theory: Experiments and Observations of the Origin of Species in the Vegetable Kingdom by Hugo de Vries (1909) translated by Arthur Dukinfield Darbishire and John Bretland Farmer
- Breeding and the Mendelian Discovery (1911)
- An Introduction to Biology (1917) posthumous publishing edited by his sister Helen
