= October Club =

October Club may refer to:

- October Club (Oxford University), an independent communist organisation
- October Club (Tory Party), a group of Tory members of Parliament

== See also ==
- Oktoberklub, an East German political music group
