= Norman Hidden =

Norman Frederick Hidden (24 October 1913 – 17 April 2006) was an English teacher, poet and author. He is best known for his involvement in the Poetry Society and as an editor and publisher of poetry magazines and books, from the later 1960s.

== Early life and background ==
He was born on 24 October 1913 in Portsmouth, the son of Frederick Charles Hidden (Fred) and his wife Ethel Victoria Kightley, who were married in 1911.

His father had "staunch socialist beliefs". He was a gunner in the Royal Garrison Artillery in World War I, and in 1919 was working to form a branch of the National Union of Ex-Service Men in Southampton.

In 1944 Fred Hidden published a booklet British Honduras, the Forgotten Colony in Belize, through the National Business Agency; and in 1948 he made a Caribbean journey as head of the National Business Agency. In 1948, also, Alexander Bustamante of the Jamaican Labour Party visited him in Bradwell-by-Braintree, for a lunch where the guests included Tom Driberg. National Business Agency Ltd., a business broker described as "business transfer specialists", was wound up in 1953.

Norman Hidden's mother Ethel died on 23 September 1955, and his father, described as a business consultant, on 9 December that year, at Frinton-on-Sea. Hidden wrote on the history of the Hidden family, and its connection to the medieval manor of Hidden, now part of Hungerford.

== Education and teacher training ==
Hidden was educated at St John's School, Porthcawl, from 1921 to 1926, and then at Hereford Cathedral School, from 1926 to 1932. He entered Brasenose College, Oxford in 1932 to read English, where he was taught by Charles Leslie Wrenn. There, according to his memoirs, he knew Bob Willcock (Henry Douglas Willcock, whom he calls Willcocks), as his tutorial partner with Wrenn. Willcock had been taught at Gresham's School by Denys Thompson. With Norman Cohn, Willcock and Hidden edited a magazine Rejected MSS; over two issues in 1934, it published Eíthne nic Liamóg and Ian Serraillier. Peter Alan Martin's dissertation on British little magazines noted the period left-wing politics in contributions by Gavin Ewart, Ronald Procter Hewett, and Harry Vincent Kemp (1911–1994) attacking Scrutiny from a Marxist perspective. Hidden mentioned Jack Winocour (1913–1978) at Magdalen College as an organiser of anti-war protests.

In an interview with Dick Russell, Hidden stated that, while he wrote poetry as an undergraduate, he was not encouraged. He graduated in 1936, and went on to take a Postgraduate Certificate in Education the following year. He then taught at the King's School, Macclesfield.

== Exchange visit ==
In 1939 Hidden and his wife Trude moved to the United States, where he had an exchange teaching post through the English-Speaking Union, at Kenton High School, Ohio. In 1941 they moved again, to begin a period at Adrian College in Michigan. The Michigan Education Journal noted that the couple had arrived there just ahead of the Pearl Harbor attack, a week before the United States declaration of war on Japan, and commented on Hidden's training as an air raid warden. Trude was enrolled at Adrian College in Kappa Kappa Gamma. An account by her of the couple's circumstances appeared in 1944, in The Key, the Kappa Kappa Gamma magazine. The couple returned to the United Kingdom in 1943.

== Teacher ==
After military service and his period in business, Hidden returned to teaching in 1953, at Goole Grammar School. He taught at Hornchurch Grammar School. His teaching career ended as a Senior Lecturer at the College of All Saints, Tottenham, a teacher training college, from 1964 to 1973.

== Poetry ==
After moving to Hornsey, Hidden founded a monthly series of pub poetry readings at the Lamb and Flag, Covent Garden, the first being on 9 June 1966. It ran to the early 1970s. Eddie Linden became involved as an organiser, and a group "Workshop Two" of poets arose from these events. Of Workshop Two it was said that its "foremost raison d'être" was to provide a "remedy for what its founder diagnosed in Labour Monthly as the real literary disease at the time, i.e. "the creative writer's lack of audience"."

Hidden was Chairman of The Poetry Society, from 1968 to 1971. There, according to Martin Booth, he was "dedicated to getting the ship straight and stopping the in-house squabbling". One of his actions was to propose (successfully) a Civil List pension for Edgell Rickword.

=== Workshop Press ===
Hidden set up Workshop Press, at 2 Culham Court, Granville Road in London N4. It is known particularly for the quarterly magazine New Poetry (its title from 1974) for which Hidden became General Editor. New Poetry ceased publication in 1981, while the Press continued, and the run ended in 1981.

New Poetry continued a series begun in 1967 as Writer's Workshop, which Hidden edited with John Pudney and the teacher Michael Johnson (1936–1972). Hidden introduced the first issue, writing that Writer's Workshop "was formed to bring poet and audience together." Guest editors included: Ivor Cutler; G. S. Fraser; John Horder (1936–2017); Edward Lucie-Smith; Charles Osborne; William Plomer; Anthony Rudolf; Jon Stallworthy; and Philip Toynbee. In his "Kryptos" editorial in the final issue 51/52 of New Poetry, Hidden wrote that it was "the leading British poetry magazine", with an annual sale of 11,000 copies. With many well-known contributors such as Jeni Couzyn, it continued to publish unknown poets. An anthology Hidden Talent: the Workshop poets, edited by Dick Russell, was published in 1993.

Hidden wrote the introduction to Madonna of the Unknown Nation by A. L. Hendriks, published by the Press in 1974. While primarily for poetry, Workshop Press published in 1971 the novel Poilu by Chris Searle.

== Political candidate ==
Hidden was the Common Wealth Party candidate at Harwich in 1944. He was then "a former schoolmaster of Bradfield, Essex, now serving with the forces". During the campaign he contacted Bob Willock, his Oxford friend who had become a teacher, about an opinion poll. Willock from 1940 was deputy to Tom Harrisson of Mass-Observation, after the departure of Charles Madge.

A Labour Party candidate in the 1950 general election at Aldershot, Hidden was defeated by Oliver Lyttleton. He was then described as "manager of a commercial firm". Since demob in 1947, he had been involved in running the National Business Agency, a family company.

== Works ==
- These Images Claw (1966).
- Say it Aloud (1972), editor. A poetry anthology for reading aloud.
- Dr. Kink & His Old-style Boarding School (1973), autobiographical.
- Over to You (1975), anthology, editor.
- Many People, Many Voices: Poetry from the English-speaking world (1978), editor, with Amy Hollins.
- The State of Poetry Today: A Survey Sponsored by New Poetry Magazine (1978), compiler.
- For My Friends (1981)
- Liaison Officer: Germany and the Anglo-US Occupation, 1946-47 (1993), autobiographical.
- Caravan Summer: And Other Stories (1999).

Hidden edited the Workshop Poets Series of 1970–1. He wrote a series of papers about Jethro Tull the agriculturist. He contributed in the 1970s poems to Brecht Times for "socialist poets" edited by Peter Langford, and to Wheels edited by Harriet Rose.

== Family ==
Hidden was three times married.

1. Firstly, in 1938 in London, to Gertrud (Trude) Gerson, daughter of the lawyer Artur Gerson of Cologne. The marriage had broken down by 1943. Gertrud Gerson became a naturalised British citizen in 1948.
2. Secondly, in 1947, to Liesel Carritt née Mottek, other married name Alexander, given names Lisbeth or Ruth. She had previous been married to Noel Carritt. The marriage was shortlived, and she returned to East Germany in 1954.
3. Thirdly, in 1960, to Joyce Collett, met in his time teaching in Goole.
