= Anthony Carritt =

Anti-fascist revolutionary from Oxford, England, member of the International Brigades

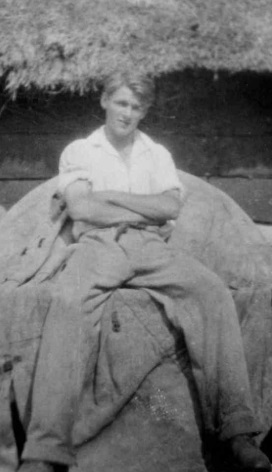
- Born: 1914; Boars Hill, Oxford, United Kingdom
- Died: 13 July 1937 (aged c. 23)
- Education: Bradfield School, Berkshire
- Known for: Anti-fascist revolutionary. Member of the famous Oxford based Carritt family of left-wing revolutionaries.
- Family: Winifred Carritt (Mother). Arthur Dukinfield Darbishire (biological father). Noel Carritt (material half-Brother). Brian Carritt (maternal half-Brother). Bill Carritt (maternal half-Brother). Michael Carritt (maternal half-Brother). Liesel Carritt (Sister in law). 2 material half-sisters.

Anthony Carritt (1914–1937) was a British left-wing activist and a member of the International Brigades during the Spanish Civil War. He and his brother Noel Carritt were ambulance drivers at the Battle of Brunete, and the two brothers fought against Spanish fascists backed by both Hitler and Mussolini. Anthony Carritt was assumed to have been killed in an airstrike after he went missing during the Battle of Brunete and was never found despite his brother spending days searching for him.

He was also notable for being a member of the famous Oxford-based Carritt family of left-wing academics and revolutionaries, including the spy Michael Carritt. He is also believed to have been the biological son of famous British evolutionary biologist Arthur Dukinfield Darbishire, despite being raised as a brother of the Carritt family.

== Early life and family ==
Anthony Carritt was born in Boars Hill, outside the city of Oxford, England. He belonged to a large family of seven children, five brothers (including himself) and two sisters. His mother Winifred Carritt was believed to have had an affair with famous British evolutionary biologist Arthur Dukinfield Darbishire, however Anthony was raised as though he were the son of Edgar Carritt. Anthony was educated at Bradfield School in Berkshire, before he began a career in farming.

The Carritt family became famous for being a hub for socialist revolutionaries and communists, such as Abraham Lazarus, Labour politicians including Dick Crossman, and poets such as WH Auden. The family was also friends with another family of left-wing activists called the Thompsons, which lived very close to the Carritt family and their children often attended Dragon School together. One of these children who Anthony knew became the historian E. P. Thompson. Anthony Carritt was considered the least political of his brothers, and it is unknown as to whether he joined the Communist Party of Great Britain (CPGB) like his mother and his brothers.

== Spanish Civil War ==
Following the outbreak of the Spanish Civil War, both Anthony and Noel Carritt joined the International Brigades. Their mother Winifred Carritt also became a leading supporter of Oxford's Spanish charity campaigns, and their brother Gabriel Carriitt headed a British Youth Movement delegation to Spain.

To join the International Brigades, Anthony gave up his job at a farm in Oxford. Both Anthony and Noel served together as ambulance drivers, and were both present at the Battle of Brunete. During the battle, the fascist forces enjoyed air superiority and temperatures often exceeded 100 degrees. Fascist aeroplanes often targeted ambulances and hospitals, and Noel Carritt's ambulance was attacked in one of these instances. After his ambulance was towed back to a hospital in Escorial, Noel realised that his brother Anthony had gone missing during the battle.

== Death and legacy ==
Anthony Carritt was assumed to have been killed in an airstrike in July 1937, after he went missing during the Battle of Brunete and was never found despite his brother Noel Carritt spending days searching for him. However some sources say he was discovered but died in hospital on the 13 July 1937 from wounds he sustained during the Battle of Brunete.

In 2017 Anthony Carritt's name was revealed during the unveiling of the Oxford Spanish Civil War memorial, raised as a part of a campaign supported by his nephew Colin Carritt.

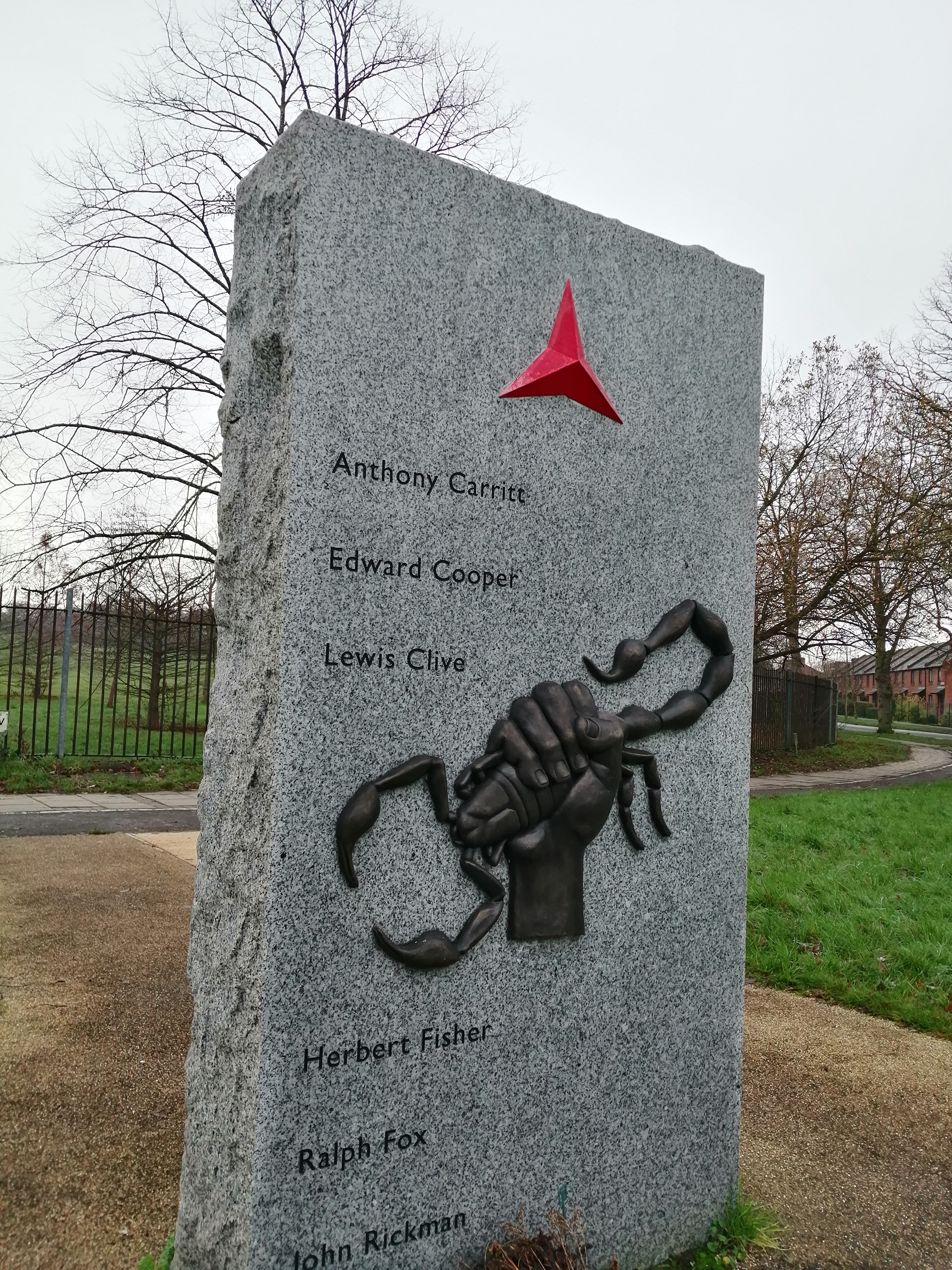
Anthony Carritt's name is listed at the top of the Oxford Spanish Civil War memorial, built in 2017.

To mark Anthony's departure to Spain, his friend the communist and future SOE officer Frank Thompson wrote a poem in his memory:

A year ago, in a drowsy vicarage garden

We talked about politics; you with your tawny hair

Flamboyant, flaunting your red tie, unburdened

Yours burning heart of the dirge we always hear -

The rich triumphant and the poor oppress'd.

And I laughed, seeing, I thought, an example

Of vague ideals not tried but taken to trust,

That would not stand the test. It sounded all too simple.

== See also ==
- Ralph Winston Fox
- Lewis Clive
- International Brigade Memorial Trust
- Alf Salisbury
- Jim Prendergast (revolutionary)
