= Bill Carritt =

British communist activist (1908–1999)

- Born: Gabriel Carritt; 9 May 1908
- Died: 7 May 1999 (aged 90)
- Education: Dragon School; Sedbergh School; Christ Church, Oxford; Columbia University
- Occupations: Secretary of the League of Nations Youth, British soldier, communist journalist, & lecturer at the London College of Printing
- Known for: Anti-fascism, support for black civil rights, communist activism
- Notable work: The Negro Student in the U.S.A.
- Political party: Communist Party of Great Britain
- Spouses: Margot Gale; Joan McMichael
- Children: 2
- Parents: Edgar Frederick Carritt (father); Winfred Carritt (mother)
- Relatives: Noel Carritt (brother); Michael Carritt (brother); Anthony Carritt (half-brother)
- Family: Carritt family

Gabriel Carritt (9 May 1908 – 7 May 1999), known as Bill Carritt, was a British communist activist known for his anti-racist and anti-fascist activities. He belonged to the Oxford based Carritt family, known for their dedication to Marxism, anti-fascist politics, and academic achievements. He travelled the United States and campaigned for the Scottsboro Boys. After a trip to the Pyrenees, he helped create the British Youth Foodship Committee which helped collect food and clothing for republican forces during the Spanish Civil War. During the war in Spain his brother Anthony Carritt was killed and his brother Noel Carritt was injured. While serving as a Secretary of the League of Nations Youth, he broke into a secret trial in Nazi Germany to protest against members of the Bündische Jugend being imprisoned for years without charges.

Despite his life-long anti-fascism and having completed an Officer training course, he was denied a commission by the British military due to his membership of the Communist Party of Great Britain. He later fought in Mandalay during WWII and later became a councillor for Westminster. In 1946 he was imprisoned alongside four fellow communists for running a campaign that sought to house homeless people in luxury flats. During the 1950s he worked full-time for the Communist Party of Great Britain and once served as the foreign editor of the Daily Worker. He then began working for the London College of Printing as a liberal studies lecturer.

== Early and family life ==
Bill Carritt was one of seven children raised by the Oxford based Carritt family, known for its Marxist and anti-fascist beliefs. His father was an Oxford university professor and English philosopher called Edgar Carritt. Bill would grow up to become a life-long anti-fascist, alongside his brothers Noel Carritt, Anthony Carritt, and Michael Carritt who all became leftist revolutionaries.

=== Education ===
Bill was educated in Oxford's Dragon School where he met John Betjeman. Between 1922 and 1927 he studied at Cumbria's Sedbergh School in 'Lupton House. During his school years he was noted for enjoying rugby. He won a scholarship to study at Oxford University's Christ Church college where he befriended the future Labour Party politician Richard Crossman along with the poets W. H. Auden and Stephen Spender. Later in life he also befriended Jean Ross.

== Activism in the United States ==
After graduating from Oxford University, Bill travelled to New York City and studied at Columbia University. During his time in America, Bill begun carrying supplies to be given to striking Kentucky miners. While helping the miners, company police attacked Bill and broke his teeth. Afterwards he toured the United States visiting the states of Alabama and Georgia where he trying to recruit African-American students to join the National Student League. During his time in the United States, Bill joined the Communist Party USA, and at some point in the coming years would also join the Communist Party of Great Britain.

== Campaign for the Scottsboro Boys ==
After returning to Britain, Bill teamed up with Nancy Cunard and begun campaigning for the Scottsboro Boys, who were African-American teenagers falsely charged of rape in and put on a show trial. For this campaign he raised funds from a wide number of influential people, including Virginia Woolf, Bertrand Russell, Vera Brittain, H. G. Wells, and Aldous Huxley.

== Teaching in Nazi Germany ==
Between 1933 and 1934, Bill taught at a German officer cadet school in Silesia. During his time as a teacher the school was taken over by the Hitler Youth, where Bill argued with the boys over the topic of the Reichstag fire. After returning to Britain, Bill began working for the World Youth Congress Movement.

== Spanish Civil War ==
During the beginning of the Spanish Civil War in 1936, Bill teamed up with British communist activist John Gollan, who was then the secretary of the Young Communist League and travelled to the Pyrenees. The goal of this journey was to discover what help could be given to the Spanish republican government during the war. The result of this fact-finding mission was the creation of the British Youth Foodship Committee, which collected food and clothing which was then donated to people living in republican territory during the war.

From 1936 he supported the Aid to Spain and the Aid to China campaigns.

=== Family and the Spanish Civil War ===
Bill was not the only member of the Carritt family to become involved in the Spanish Civil War. Bill's mother Winfred helped to care for Spanish refugees. Bill's brothers Anthony Carritt and Noel Carritt both joined the International Brigades and fought in the war. Anthony was killed and Noel was injured.

Bill's sister-in-law Liesel Carritt, a German-Jewish refugee that the Carritt family had saved from the Nazis, also fought against fascism in Spain as a member of the International Brigades.

== Gatecrashing Nazi secret trial ==
At some point Bill had become the Secretary of the League of Nations Youth. During this time he travelled to Essen in June 1936 where he gatecrashed the secret Nazi trial of the Bündische Jugend (German Youth Movement) in protest against the Nazi imprisonment of young men who were being kept without knowing their charges for over two years.

== Political career and Second World War ==
Bill's anti-fascist beliefs led to him running as an anti-appeasement candidate in the Westminster Abbey by-election, 1939. He won the support of a wide range of people across many different political parties, including members of the Communist Party, the Labour Party, the Liberal Party, and even some anti-Chamberlain conservatives. His campaign even secretly received funding from some of Chamberlain's own ministers. Bill won the election with 32.6% of the vote (4,674 votes).

Shortly after his election victory, he and many other political activists were invited by Winston Churchill to discuss collective security and anti-fascism.

=== WWII military service ===
During the Second World War, Bill joined the Royal Artillery and completed an officers' training course. He then entered a radar training course, but was then pulled from training and told that his communist beliefs would bar him from receiving a commission.

=== Daily Worker protest letter ===
During the Second World War, the British communist newspaper the Daily Worker, today known as the Morning Star, was barred from being able to send foreign correspondents to travel with British troops during WWII. Bill organised a protest letter against this decision to bar the Daily Worker journalists from reporting on the second front, and began collecting signatures for the letter. However after the protest letter was submitted, every person who had signed their name were subsequently questioned by British intelligence officers.

=== Combat in Burma ===
During the war, Bill joined the British military's Welch Regiment and fought in Burma (now Myanmar) against Japanese forces near the city of Mandalay.

=== 1945 General Election ===
Following his participation at the battle of Mandalay, Bill was air-lifted back to Britain to stand as the Communist Party's candidate for Westminster Abbey in the 1945 UK General Election, during which he polled 17.6% of the vote. Later both he and his wife Joan McMichael were elected to Westminster council.

== Post-war Communist Party activism ==
=== Old Bailey trial for housing homeless families ===
In 1946 Bill was put on trial after he and four other communist activists led a campaign to house homeless families in empty luxury flats. Bill was put on trial at the Old Bailey. He was defended by the lawyer Walter Monckton and found guilty of leading this campaign, after which a major defence campaign was started and his sentence was lowered from imprisonment to being "bound over to keep the peace for two years."

=== Cold War communist activism ===
Bill continued to work as a full-time member of the Communist Party of Great Britain up until the 1960s, though he would remain a passive supporter of the party for the rest of his life. During the 1950s he became a foreign editor for the Daily Worker.

== Later life and death ==
In his later life, Bill began working for the London College of Printing as a liberal studies lecturer. He kept this job for approximately a decade before retiring. As his eyesight began to fail, he made frequent use of "talking book services".

Bill Carritt died on 7 May 1999, at the age of 90.

== Works ==
- The Negro Student in the U.S.A
