= Battle of Carfax =

1936 British political brawl

The Battle of Carfax
- Date: 25 May 1936
- Location: Oxford, Cornmarket Street, Carfax Assembly Rooms
- Caused by: Violent attempts by Blackshirts to remove the journalist Basil Murray
- Result: Anti-fascist victory.; Increased anti-fascist sentiment across Oxford.; British Union of Fascists cease all public meetings in Oxford.; Greater cooperation between left-wing movements across Oxford.

Parties
British Union of Fascists (Blackshirts)	Anti-fascists: Trade unionists; Labour Party supporters; Communist Party of Great Britain supporters

Lead figures
Sir Oswald Mosley	No clear defined leadership.

Casualties and losses
4 hospitalized	Multiple minor injuries

The Battle of Carfax (1936) was a violent skirmish in the city of Oxford between the British Union of Fascists (BUF) and local anti-fascists, trade unionists, and supporters of the Labour Party and the Communist Party of Great Britain. The battle took place inside Oxford's Carfax Assembly Rooms, a once popular meeting hall owned by Oxford City Council which was used for public events and located on Cornmarket Street.

Historians disagree on the exact details of the events that took place. Some historians argue that the fighting was sparked primarily by fascist violence against attendees, others credit attempts by local communists to disrupt fascist activities, or some combination of these two factors.

== Background ==
=== Fascists in Oxford ===
Oswald Mosley, then leader of the British Union of Fascists (BUF), visited Oxford numerous times for political meetings throughout the early 1930s. These meetings were often disorderly, but had never broken out into a large violent fight. The BUF targeted their recruitment towards students of the University of Oxford, doing so through the Oxford University Fascist Association (OUFA), which was established in 1933 and was considered one of the most active university-based fascist organisations in Britain.

Oswald Mosley's fascist activities were financed by Oxford factory owner and wealthy capitalist William Morris (Lord Nuffield) who gave Mosley £35,000 to fund a pro-fascist and anti-Semitic newspaper called Action, and £50,000 in 1930 to support the activities of the fascist New Party, which would soon afterwards join with other organisations to form the British Union of Fascists.

=== Anti-Fascism in Oxford ===
In 1933 students from Ruskin College founded the Red Shirts, Oxford's first organisation dedicated solely to anti-fascism. Many of the Red Shirts were communists and volunteered to act as stewards at events held by the October Club, Oxford University's communist society.

The opposition to Britain's fascist movements was primarily led by the Communist Party of Great Britain (CPGB), whose Oxford branch was headed by the working-class organiser Abraham Lazarus (Firestone Bill). Lazarus was a Marxist activist who had been raised in London by a Jewish family. Upon arriving in Oxford, Lazarus soon became a popular figure among Oxford's working class for leading the successful 1934 strike of thousands of factory workers in one of William Morris's factories, for leading the Florence Park rent strikes against local slumlords, and for organising a march of approximately 2,000 people against Oxford's Cutteslowe walls. Lazarus was also able to create successful links between local communist activists and the Oxford branch of the Labour Party. Although Lazarus was not present at the Battle of Carfax, his work to organise anti-fascist activism within the city of Oxford helped facilitate the decline of fascist politics in the city.

Alongside the rise of Communist Party activity among Oxford's working class, another factor in the rising tide of anti-fascist activity in the city was the arrival of German refugees fleeing the Nazis. Many of these refugees were academics with the most notable examples including the scientists Albert Einstein and Ernst Chain. Many working German refugees also made Oxford their home such as the activist Liesel Carritt and her family.

== The Battle of Carfax ==
=== The meeting ===
On the night of 25 May 1936, Oswald Mosley who was then serving as the leader of the British Union of Fascists (BUF) held a public event in a hall called the Carfax Assembly Rooms. This location was a popular venue for public events in Oxford and was owned by Oxford City Council, who allowed Mosley to host his event in the Carfax Assembly Rooms after denying him the right to use Oxford Town Hall for his public event.

The Assembly Rooms were filled with an estimated 1,000 people, though a large number of the people inside the hall were anti-fascists who showed up to protest against Mosley and the BUF. Blackshirts were lined up around the walls of the hall, surrounding the crowd of attendees. Eyewitnesses who attended the meeting noted that many people in the crowd attempted to peacefully disrupt the meeting by making loud noises with their hands and feet, rustling large newspapers, and heckling the fascists. Other eyewitnesses recall Mosley playing the anthem of the Nazi Party, the "Horst-Wessel-Lied".

While Mosley spoke inside the Carfax Assembly Rooms, a crowd of local workers held an anti-fascist demonstration outside the meeting. A large number of these workers were bus drivers who had gone on strike earlier that month and had made Communist Party activist Abraham Lazarus their spokesperson. These workers were influenced by communist political ideology, and consequently anti-fascism. These workers attended the anti-fascist demonstration not to violently break up the fascist meeting, but to intervene if the BUF were to become violent against anti-fascist protesters.

=== The violence ===
During the meeting, Mosley attempted to provoke the crowd by giving a speech in which he insulted the Labour Party by calling them 'pink rabbits in the pay of the Jews", and insulted workers and the students of Ruskin College by claiming they had "stage guardsman accents". The meeting appeared to have become less tense the longer it went on, until one of the Blackshirts attempted to violently eject one of the hecklers, the journalist and Liberal Party politician Basil Murray. The brutality of the Blackshirts shocked many in the audience, and the hall erupted into a violent fight. The bus workers present defended the heckler and fought against the Blackshirts.

Despite the violence being instigated by the Blackshirts and the presence of a large number of organised fascist paramilitary-style members, the physical fight appeared to have been an overwhelming anti-fascist victory. Four Blackshirts were hospitalised, while anti-fascists appeared to have only suffered minor injuries including bruises and a cut lip. Following the violence, the meeting ended quickly and there was no further violence.

Following the eruption of violence, Mosley fled through a side door in the meeting hall. The events of the Battle of Carfax and the involvement of one of the attendees, Frank Pakenham, was then raised in the Houses of Parliament by Labour Party politician Hugh Dalton.

== Accounts of the battle ==
Following the Battle of Carfax, many local Oxford residents and students published their eyewitness accounts and reactions to the events and their opinions on Mosley and the BUF.

In a testament to how deeply the Battle of Carfax damaged the reputation of fascism among Oxford's residents, almost all of the available published reactions have been negative, condemning Oswald Mosley and the Blackshirts for their violent behaviour.

Hugh Trevor-Roper, a British historian who was then a student studying in Oxford, wrote to his mother with an account of the Battle of Carfax:

"Great damage to the Blackshirts was done by one of the dons of Christ Church (Frank Pakenham), who, being struck over the head by a Blackshirt with a steel chain, was roused to a berserk fury."

Elizabeth Longford, a British historian who later married Frank Pakenham, recounted the violent ejection of journalist Basil Murray by Blackshirts which preceded the violence:

'Mosley gave a sign to the posse and Blackshirts moved forward and seized Basil. The bus drivers picked up the chairs and bashed the posse over the head with the chairs. You couldn't see across the hall as it was swirling with dust.

Olive Gibbs, the future chair of Oxford City Council and the Campaign for Nuclear Disarmament, described the battle of Carfax:

'…anyone in the audience daring to venture a contradictory viewpoint was summarily and with unbelievable brutality ejected.'

Patrick Gordon Walker, the future chair of the British Film Institute and a member of parliament for almost 30 years, wrote articles for a local publication denouncing Mosley's behaviour and blaming the violence on the Blackshirts:

"It is very difficult for the outsider who has not been to a Mosley meeting to realise the menace to democracy and free speech represented by his movement. It is not that the Fascists themselves go about directly causing violence and breaking up meetings: their technique is much more subtle and dangerous than that. Their technique is well illustrated in the recent meeting at Oxford. From the very beginning, a deliberate attempt was made to provoke the crowd and bring it to a high and excited pitch of indignation. The mere presence of Blackshirt stewards along the walls and round the platform was calculated to anger the crowd."

Richard Crossman, the future chair of the Labour Party, professor, and editor of the New Statesman, denounced Mosley's tactics and sympathised with the anti-fascists:

"I cannot pretend I am sorry that an Oxford audience did not take this 'sitting down.' It is Mosley's peculiar art to make decent law-abiding people see red. In that case it might be better for the decent law-abiding people to leave him to mouth in a vacuum."

Frank Pakenham, who took part in the Battle of Carfax and fought against the fascists, also gave a published account of the Battle of Carfax:

"Whether or no Mosley and his agents are guilty of having committed criminal offences on Monday is for the courts to decide; but in any case, no decent person who was present is likely to attend any more meetings addressed by this grotesque clown. For his dupes, even for the wretched quartet who continued to rabbit-punch me for some time after the uproar had subsided, I feel nothing but pity. They looked timid and uneasy, and anything but happy to have to carry out their leader's work. Thank God, Oxford is not likely to be impressed by the mechanical bleating of this gimcrack fencing master, so facetious about working-class accents, so deaf to the sound of his own."

== Aftermath ==
Basil Murray and Bernard Floud were subsequently tried for breach of the peace. Floud's case was dismissed but Murray was fined in a proceeding described by Isaiah Berlin and Maurice Bowra as a miscarriage of justice.

Although the physical violence during the Battle of Carfax was minor and paled in comparison to similar events such as the Battle of Cable Street, the aftermath was a disaster for the BUF, destroying their reputation among Oxford's residents and crippling the BUF's ability to openly organise in the city. The aftermath of the Battle of Carfax also resulted in an increase in cooperation between various left-wing movements across Oxford.

The long-term result of the Battle of Carfax was a sharp decline in support for fascism throughout Oxford, many of whom opposed the violent tactics of the British Union of Fascists. This decline in the public support for fascism in Oxford was hastened by the fascist uprising in Spain which sparked the beginning of the Spanish Civil War (1936–1939) only several months after the Battle of Carfax, and further declined following local aid campaigns for Spain and the arrival of Spanish refugees.

By 1939 the BUF had entirely retreated from the city's working class population and retreated to the privacy of Oxford University. Soon afterwards came the beginning of the Second World War which practically ended fascist politics in Oxford. Mosley and other leading British fascists were then interned under Defence Regulation 18B. However, fascist movements began to reemerge in Oxford during the late 1940s.

== See also ==
- The October Club - Oxford University's communist society
- Carritt family -Family of anti-fascists based in Oxford
- Oxford Spanish Civil War memorial - Anti-fascist memorial built in 2017
- Charlie Hutchison - one of the liberators of Bergen-Belsen concentration camp, born in Oxfordshire
- Lewis Clive - Oxford educated anti-fascist from Christ Church college and Olympic gold medalist in rowing
- Battle of Cable Street - the most famous battle between the BUF and anti-fascists in British history
- Public Order Act 1936
