= Edgar Frederick Carritt =

English philosopher

Edgar Frederick Carritt FBA
- Carritt in 1946
- Born: 27 February 1876; London, England
- Died: 19 June 1964 (aged 88); Ascot, Berkshire, England
- Education: Hertford College, Oxford
- Employer: University College, Oxford
- Children: Noel Carritt; Anthony Carritt; Michael Carritt; Bill Carritt
- Awards: Chancellor's Essay Prize (1901)

Edgar Frederick Carritt (27 February 1876 – 19 June 1964) was an English philosopher who wrote on aesthetics, moral philosophy and political philosophy. He was a fellow of University College, Oxford, from 1898 to 1945. He was a member of the famous Oxfordshire based Carritt family, whose members included many Marxist academics and revolutionaries.

== Life and career ==
Born in London, he was the son of Frederick Blasson Carritt, a solicitor, and Edith, née Price. He studied at Bradfield College and at Hertford College, Oxford, where he read classics. Graduating with a first in 1898, he was almost immediately elected to a classical fellowship at University College, Oxford; within a few months, he was also appointed as the college's tutor in philosophy, succeeding Vernon Storr, who left the fellowship in 1899. In 1901, Carritt won the Chancellor's Essay Prize and the following year started to lecture on aesthetics; his lectures are thought to have been among the first on that topic delivered at the university.

Carritt held a university lectureship in philosophy between 1938 and 1941. In 1937, Carritt also gave the Philosophical Lecture at the British Academy; he was elected a fellow of the academy in 1945. Carritt remained at University College until he retired in 1945; He died on 19 June 1964 and was survived by his wife, Winifred, who died the next year.

== Works ==
Characterised as an ethical intuitionist and an aesthetic expressivist, among his key publications were Theory of Beauty (1914; 2nd ed., 1923), The Theory of Morals (1928), Philosophies of Beauty from Socrates to Robert Bridges (1931), What is Beauty? (1932) and Morals and Politics (1935), Ethical and Political Thinking (1947), Introduction to Aesthetics (1948), My Philosophy: Selected Essays of B. Croce (1949) and A Calendar of British Taste, 1600–1800 (1949).
