= Abraham Lazarus =

British communist activist

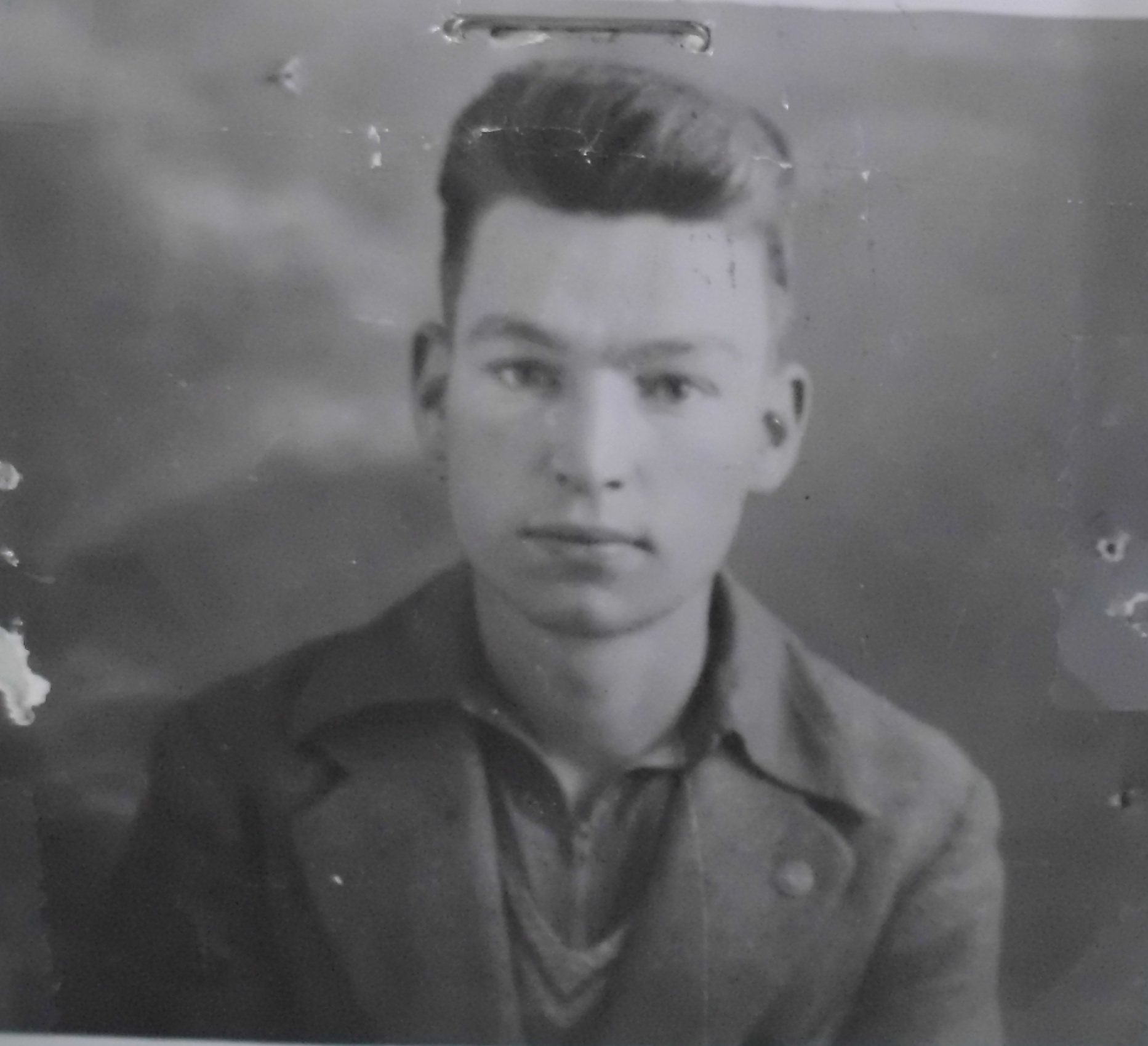
- Abe Lazarus, 1934
- Born: April 1911
- Died: 1967 (aged 55–56)
- Other name: Firestone Bill
- Citizenship: United Kingdom
- Occupation: Trade union activist
- Known for: Anti-fascist and trade union activity in Oxford
- Political party: Communist Party of Great Britain (CPGB)
- Spouse: Mabel Browning
- Children: 1 daughter

Abraham Lazarus (1911–1967) was a leading British Communist activist, charity worker, and anti-fascist, most famous for leading factory strikes in London and Oxford, and for organising communists and Jews to resist the British Union of Fascists. He was also the leader of a protest movement to topple Oxford's Cutteslowe Wall which segregated a poor working class community from a wealthier one. While living in Oxford, he led tenant strikes in Cowley, and raised money for refugee children from the Spanish Civil War.

== Early life ==
Lazarus contracted rheumatic fever during his childhood and this affected his education, because of his condition he was taught at home by his mother. His health recovered in 1928 so he got a job working as a professional driver and a mechanic, later on in 1930 he joined the Hammersmith branch of the Communist Party of Great Britain and became involved in the National Unemployed Workers' Movement. While in London he was often seen selling the Daily Worker outside Belsize Park tube station. In 1933 he led a strike at the Firestone tyre factory and this earned him the nickname 'Bill Firestone'. After the strike he became the South Midlands organiser for the Communist Party.

== Highlights as CP organiser ==
=== Pressed Steel strike ===
On Friday 13 July 1934, workers at the Pressed Steel plant in Oxford went on strike. Employees on the night shift in the press shop were paid short on their wages, they stopped work and elected a deputation, consisting of four women and twelve men, to see management the next morning. The deputation was turned down. The following Monday, 100 night shift workers walked out and the deputation became a provisional strike committee. The wife of one of the members of this provisional committee had recalled the Communist Party's assistance during a previous strike in South Wales and, although there were no communists on the committee itself, they decided to approach the local party branch in Oxford for support.

At this time there were a number of communists in the factory, many with a history of industrial militancy in South Wales and elsewhere. Communists advised the strike committee to include demands for higher pay, better conditions and trades union recognition. That night, the Communist Party printed 1,000 leaflets to try to extend the strike to other groups in the factory and by Tuesday, 180 workers were on strike. In recognition of the importance of the strike, the party sent Lazarus to Oxford to support the local branch. He came to the city on Tuesday night along with two full-time organisers from the Transport and General Workers Union (TGWU), and shortly after his arrival Lazarus was made chair of the strike committee.

On Thursday 19th, the Oxford & District Trades Council held a special meeting at which they voted to back the strike to "make Pressed Steel 100% union". A 'council of action' was formed and two mass meetings were organised in St Giles. Lazarus addressed both meetings and drew large crowds, the first meeting on Friday had 1,000 people and the second on Sunday attracted over 3,000 people.

The strikers put forward four demands:

1. Abolition of all piecework
2. 1s 6d flat rate bonus for all departments
3. No victimisation
4. Trade union recognition

On Monday 23rd, the strike committee met with management for the first time. After two hours, they returned with a printed statement signed by Otto Müeller the managing director. Lazarus translated it into more understandable English. There was no reference to wages and conditions and a refusal to recognise the union. The statement was unanimously rejected and a new set of demands was agreed by the strikers who by Wednesday numbered nearly 1,000.

The strike had also gained support within the local community. The Trades Council donated £150 to the strike fund, the strike committee independently raised £100 on its own, while the TGWU itself contributed £300. A soup kitchen had been set up by Cowley Labour Party women, the Oxford branch of the NUWM collected food and money, and the Oxford Co-operative Society set up a system of vouchers for the strikers. Railway workers were asked not to move parts from the factory, and workers in other car plants in Dagenham, Coventry and Birmingham refused to handle goods from Pressed Steel.

General Secretary of the TGWU Ernest Bevin intervened behind the scenes, appealing to the factory management to accept the strikers' demands. Pressed Steel was also coming under increasing pressure to fulfill orders and get production moving again. By Saturday 28th the factory management had capitulated, and on Monday 30th the strikers returned to work with a guaranteed basic hourly rate, no victimization and full union recognition. 1,500 workers joined unions at the factory.

In recognition of his role in the strike, the Unite office in Oxford was officially named Abe Lazarus House in 2013.

=== Florence Park ===
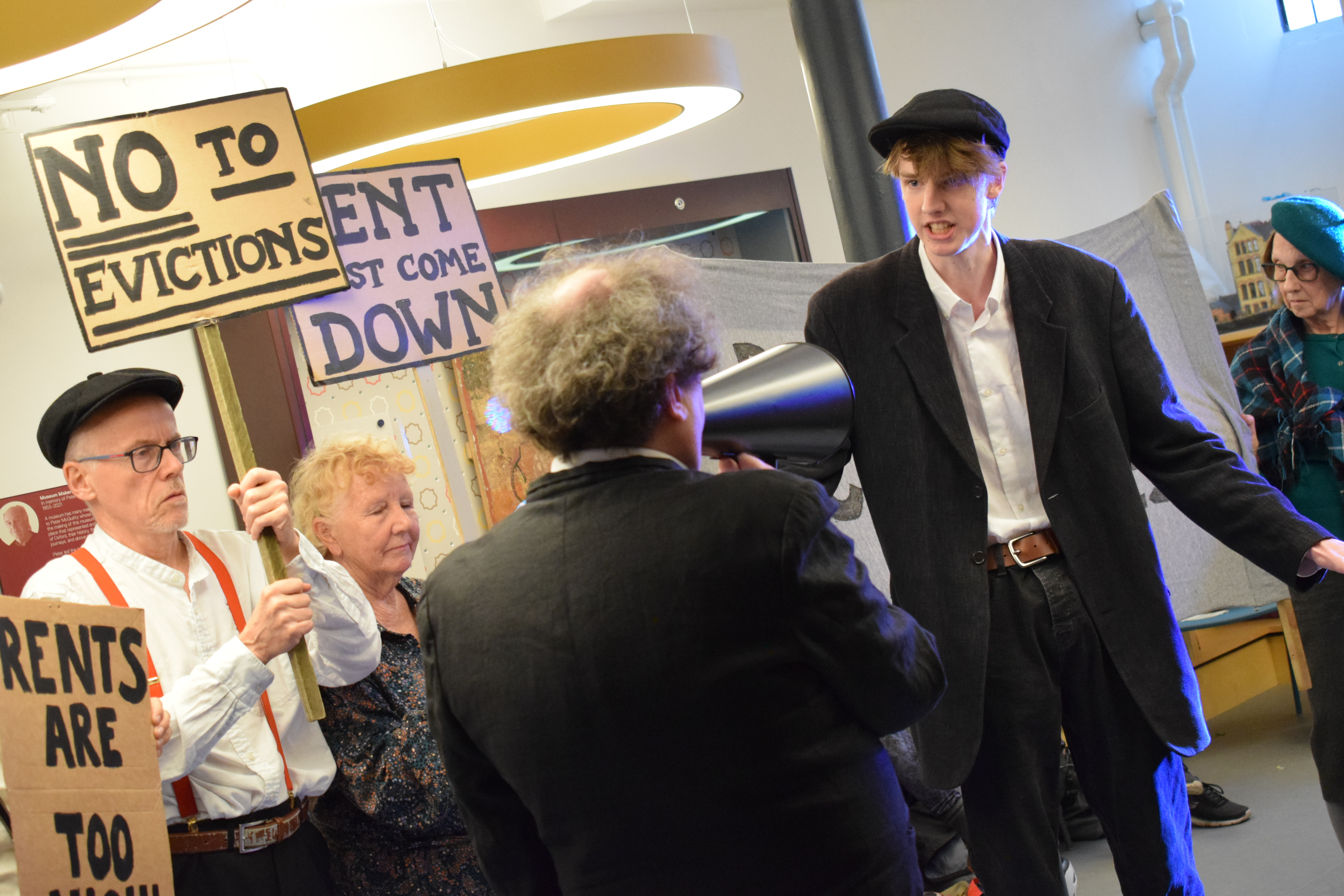
An actor playing the role of Abraham Lazarus performs in Little Edens, a theatrical production set during the Florence Park rent strike. Museum of Oxford, 2023.

Oxford's population grew rapidly in the 1920s and 1930s as people were brought in to work at the Morris Motors and Pressed Steel factories. Organisation in the factories increased the profile of the Communist Party and led to its involvement in non-industrial disputes, such as struggles over housing conditions.

Many of the new workers at Pressed Steel moved onto the recently built Florence Park estate in Cowley, there was such a large in-migration from South Wales that the area was dubbed 'little Rhondda'. These workers also brought with them a tradition of collective involvement in the labour movement, they were inclined to organisation and militancy. Lazarus was called upon when issues arose with the quality of their new homes.

The estate had been established in 1934 on the land of George Allen who owned the nearby Steam Plough factory. Allen had been refused planning permission to extend the factory onto what was at the time boggy farmland, but permission was given for Frederick Moss to build 600 houses on the site. The houses were built rapidly on low-lying marshland which was vulnerable to flooding; tenants complained of poor construction quality and unsanitary living conditions, leading them to commission an architectural report which upheld their grievances. In addition to housing quality issues, rents on the estate were around two and a half times higher than equivalent council-owned housing.

On hearing of the problems tenants were facing Lazarus made his way to the tenant manager's office, he spoke to the residents and a large crowd formed. Lazarus suggested they retire to the Pembroke Hall, where a committee was organised and a large campaign was launched. Daily meetings were held, culminating in a march of 200 people on the Town Hall on 11 April. In May the tenants held a rent strike which was defeated when 4 of the strikers were evicted for rent arrears. Nevertheless, the estate was later sold on to another owner who made some improvements, and the Florence Park tenants association survives to this day.

A similar housing campaign was waged on the Great Headley Estate of Headington in 1939.

=== Cutteslowe Walls ===
The major event of 1935 in which Lazarus took a leading role was the campaign against the Cutteslowe Walls. The walls had been built in December 1934 to separate the established homeowners of older, private homes from the residents of newly built social housing immediately adjacent. The barriers were 7 feet (2.1 m) high, reinforced by buttresses and topped off with rotating spikes. For residents of the council estate, the walls cut off access to Banbury road, forcing them to take long diversions in order to get in and out of the estate.

After having been advised by Stafford Cripps that the walls were illegal, Lazarus organised a demonstration for 11 May 1935 to march on the wall and knock it down. On the day a crowd of 2,000 people gathered at Wren road. Lazarus and a companion then walked to one of the walls wielding pickaxes. They were blocked by a line of police officers who threatened to arrest them for assault if they went any further. Defeated, Lazarus returned to the crowd and climbed up a tree to make a speech. A long campaign ensued before the walls were finally taken down on 9 March 1959.

=== Elections contested ===
Lazarus stood multiple times as a communist in the Cowley & Iffley ward during the Oxford City Council elections. He was never elected, although he did gain a significant proportion of the votes. In 1937 he stood for Cowley on a joint ticket with Frank Pakenham, and he came very close to winning the seat.

Year	Votes	%
1936	1488	23
1937	1536	25
1945	2184	15
1946	940	9

On 8 June 1938 he was elected to the Oxford City Council ARP committee. Later on in October 1938 he was involved in a parliamentary by-election, which was significant as one of the few British elections contested by an anti-fascist Popular Front shortly before the Second World War.

== Personal life ==
Lazarus was Jewish by background. He married Mabel Browning, a scientific assistant, in 1937: they had one daughter. Lazarus often took his family on holiday to France but in 1951 he was deported from France and forbidden to return after, in February of that year, he had visited Czechoslovakia as a guest of the miners' union.

In 1953 he attended the 4th World Festival of Youth and Students in Bucharest as a reporter for World News and Views.

== See also ==
- Michael Carritt
- Noel Carritt
- Anthony Carritt
- Liesel Carritt
- Thora Silverthorne
- Charlie Hutchison
- Battle of Carfax
