= Ralph Winston Fox =

British revolutionary, journalist, novelist and historian (1900–1936)

- Born: 30 March 1900; Halifax, England
- Died: (Disputed) 28 December 1936; Jaén, Battle of Lopera
- Cause of death: Killed during the Battle of Lopera
- Monuments: Oxford Spanish Civil War memorial
- Education: Degree in Modern Languages, Magdalen College, University of Oxford
- Organization: International Brigade
- Political party: Communist Party of Great Britain
- Relatives: (Brother) Sir Lionel Wray Fox.

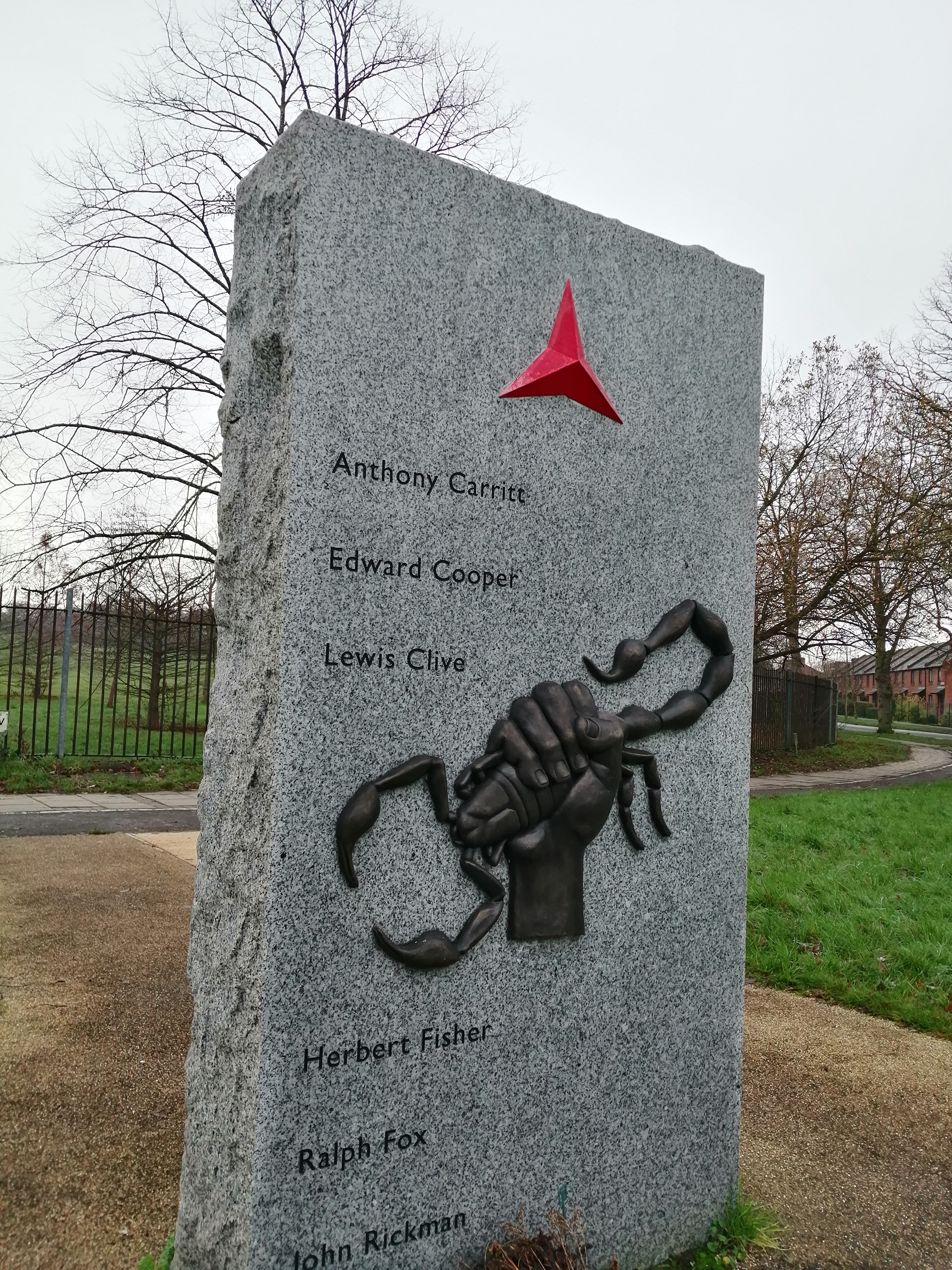
Ralph (Winston) Fox's name on the Oxford Spanish Civil War memorial. He along with five others with links to Oxfordshire were commemorated with this memorial, erected in 2017.

Ralph Winston Fox (30 March 1900 – 28 December 1936) was a British revolutionary, journalist, novelist, and historian, best remembered as a biographer of Lenin and Genghis Khan. Fox was one of the best-known members of the Communist Party of Great Britain (CPGB) to be killed in Spain fighting against the Nationalist faction in the Spanish Civil War.

== Biography ==
=== Early years ===
Fox was born 30 March 1900 in Halifax, Yorkshire, England, to a middle-class family. He knew James Crowther in his youth and helped stimulate Crowther's interest in Marxism. Fox studied modern languages at Oxford University's Magdalen College, where he was drafted into Oxford University Officers’ Training Corps. Although commissioned as a lieutenant, the war ended before Fox was sent to the front lines of World War I. During his time in Oxford, Fox joined the Oxford University Labour Club, where he met activist fellow activist Tom Wintringham.

In 1919 Fox became active in the effort to halt British blockade and military intervention to overthrow the Bolshevik government which had assumed power in the Russian Revolution of 1917. He was active in the Oxford Hands Off Russia Committee and was instrumental in helping to organise the local CPGB unit.

== 1920s and Soviet experiences ==
In 1920 as the dust was settling from the Russian Civil War, Fox travelled to Soviet Russia, an experience which further moved him towards lifelong identification with the communist political movement. Fox returned to Oxford, where in 1922 he graduated with a first class honours in modern languages. In the summer following graduation, Fox returned to Soviet Russia, this time as a worker with the Friends Relief Mission in Samara. Back in Great Britain, he went to work as a functionary for the CPGB in its propaganda department. He also studied in at the School of Foreign Languages and wrote his first major book, People of the Steppes, which was published in 1925. In 1925 Fox returned once again to Moscow, this time to work in the apparatus of the Communist International. He met his wife in the Soviet Union and married in the spring of 1926. In 1928 Fox went to work for the Sunday Worker, the high-profile weekly predecessor of the Daily Worker, launched in 1930. Fox and his wife returned once again to the Soviet Union in 1929, where he took a position as a librarian at the Marx–Engels Institute in Moscow.

== 1930s and Spanish Civil War ==
During his time with the Marx-Engels Institute, Fox began a detailed study of the Asiatic Mode of Production as reflected in the writings of Karl Marx. He published an article on the topic, "The Views of Marx and Engels on the Asiatic Mode of Production and Their Sources," in the journal Letopisi marksizma in 1930. Fox returned once again to England in 1932, going to work for the Daily Worker as a columnist and writing several pamphlets and books for the Communist press. In 1935, Fox attended the International Writers Congress in Paris, where he shared a hotel room with authors Mike Gold and James Hanley.

In 1936, with the goal of defeating fascism in the Spanish Civil War, Fox joined the International Brigades through the French Communist Party. When he arrived in Spain towards the end of the year, he was sent to Albacete for training, and was assigned to the XIVth Brigade. He worked for a time as a political commissar at the Albacete base for English people. He was then transferred to the front in one of the first operations in which the Brigades were involved.

Ralph Fox died at the Battle of Lopera in the province of Jaén on 28 December 1936. During the same fascist attack that killed Fox, his friend the Cambridge poet John Cornford was also killed. Some biographies state that Fox died on 3 January 1937, because it was the date that his death was first made public. However, historians have subsequently placed his death in late December.

=== Legacy ===
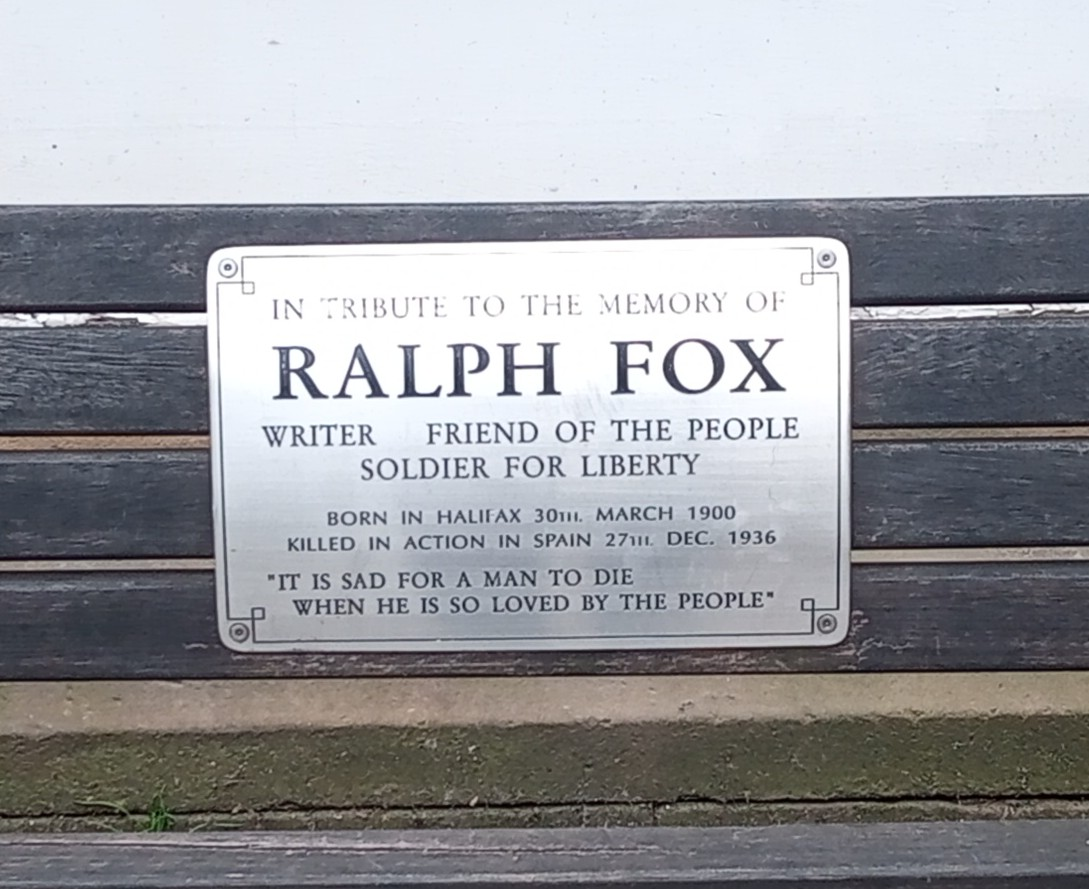
Ralph Fox memorial bench outside Halifax Town Hall

After Fox's death, CPGB leader Harry Pollitt published a tribute honouring Fox, praising his contributions to the fight against fascism. Additional tributes were collected and published in Ralph Fox: A Writer in Arms (1937).

The Marx Memorial Library holds many of Fox's papers and correspondence. Primary sources on Fox are available at the Working Class Movement Library at Salford, and at Halifax Central Library.

A bench with a plaque commemorating Fox is located outside Halifax Town Hall. Prior to 2019, it was located in the walled garden in Manor Heath Park, close to where Fox was born. The bench was erected in April 1950 by the Ralph Fox Memorial Committee, with the assistance of Marxist historian E. P. Thompson.

Fox's name is included on the Oxford Spanish Civil War memorial.

== Works ==
- Captain Youth: A Romantic Comedy for All Socialist Children. London: C. W. Daniel, 1922. OCLC 4275930. – Three-act play
- People of the Steppes. London: Constable, 1925. OCLC 7424881.
- A Defence of Communism: In Reply to H. J. Laski. London: Communist Party of Great Britain, 1927. OCLC 7542738.
- Storming Heaven. London: Constable, 1928. OCLC 10422413. – Novel
- 1880-1914. London: Lawrence, 1932. OCLC 254284172.
- The Class Struggle in Britain in the Epoch of Imperialism. London: Lawrence, 1932-33. LCCN 33-15262. Three volumes.
- Lenin: A Biography. London: Victor Gollancz, 1933. OCLC 4401750
- 1914–1923. London: Lawrence, 1933. OCLC 254286498.
- The Colonial Policy of British Imperialism. London: M. Lawrence, 1933. LCCN 35-1587
- Essays in the History of Materialism. London: John Lane, 1934. OCLC 4812669. LCCN 35-8824. Translated by Fox.
- Aspects of Dialectical Materialism. London: Watts, 1934. OCLC 5153156. Co-authored with Hyman Levy, John Macmurray, R. Page Arnot, J. D. Bernal and E. F. Carritt.
- Communism and a Changing of Civilisation. London: John Lane, 1935. OCLC 477185894
- Marxism and Modern Thought. New York: Harcourt, Brace and Company, 1935. LCCN 35-20653. Translated by Fox.
- France Faces the Future. New York: International Publishers, 1936. OCLC 1925325
- Genghis Khan. New York: Harcourt, Brace and Company, 1936. OCLC 2193185
- Portugal Now. London: Lawrence & Wishart, 1937. OCLC 8019814. (posthumous)
- This Was Their Youth. London: Secker & Warburg, 1937. OCLC 1277745 (posthumous)
- Marx, Engels and Lenin on Ireland. New York: International Publishers, 1940. OCLC 3191949 (posthumous)
- The Novel and the People. New York: International Publishers, 1945. OCLC 1739156 (posthumous, first published by Lawrence & Wishart in 1937)

== See also ==
- Bill Alexander (politician)
- GCT Giles
- Charlie Hutchison
- Thora Silverthorne
