= Lewis Clive =

British rower

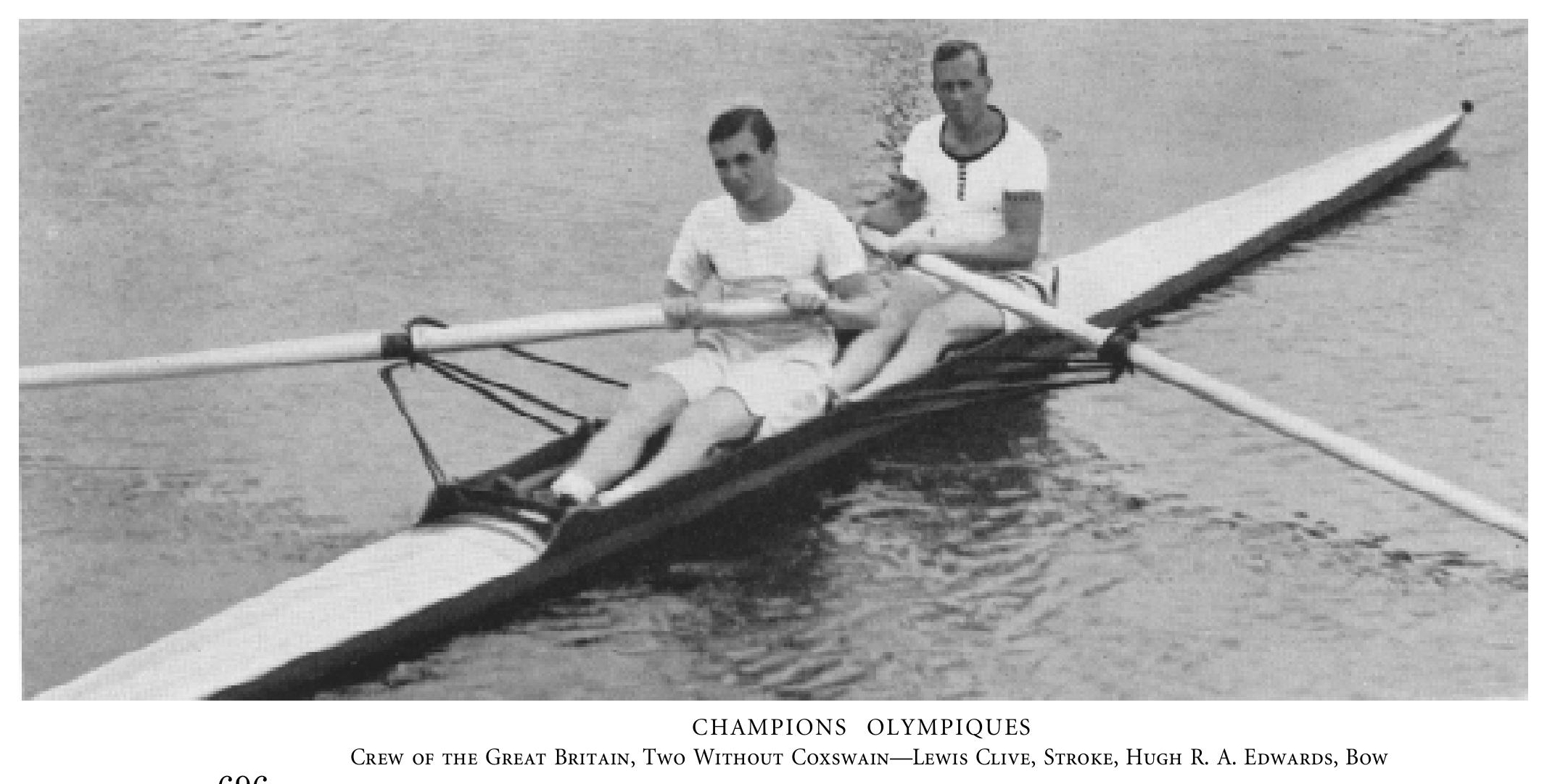
- Clive (left) and Hugh Edwards at the 1932 Summer Olympics in Los Angeles
- Born: 8 September 1910; Herefordshire, UK
- Died: (Disputed) - c. 3 August 1938; Hill 481, Spain
- Cause of death: Shot in the head during combat against Spanish fascists
- Monuments: Oxford Spanish Civil War memorial
- Education: Christ Church, Oxford, Eton, Heatherdown School.
- Organization: International Brigade
- Father: Percy Clive
- Awards: Olympic gold medal in Rowing, 1932

Olympic medal record

Men's rowing
Gold medal – first place	1932 Los Angeles	Coxless pair

Lewis Clive (8 September 1910 – c. 2 August 1938) was a British rower who won a gold medal in the 1932 Summer Olympics. He volunteered to fight for the Republicans in the Spanish Civil War and was killed in action.

== Life ==
Born in Herefordshire, Clive was the younger son of Lt-Col. Percy Clive, a Liberal Unionist (later Conservative) MP for Ross who was killed in the First World War. He was educated at Heatherdown Preparatory School near Ascot, then Eton where he became captain of both Oppidans and Boats.

Clive read law at Christ Church, Oxford, matriculating in 1929. He rowed in the losing Oxford boats in the Boat Races in 1930 and 1931. He partnered Hugh Edwards to win the Silver Goblets at Henley in 1931 and 1932. They were selected to compete in the coxless pairs at the 1932 Summer Olympics, where they won the gold medal with a comfortable victory in the final at Long Beach, California.

In August 1932, Clive was commissioned in the Grenadier Guards; he resigned his commission in 1937.

During the 1930s, Clive, influenced by the threat of fascism, moved politically to the left. He was a member of the Fabian Society and a founding member of the National Council for Civil Liberties in 1934. Clive was elected as a Labour Party councillor for St Charles ward of the Metropolitan Borough of Kensington in 1937.

His The People's Army, with an introduction by Major C. R. Attlee, the leader of the Labour Party, was published by Victor Gollancz Ltd, under the auspices of the New Fabian Research Bureau in 1938.

Clive fell in love with Mary Farmar (the author Mary Wesley) and asked her to marry him.

== Spanish Civil War ==
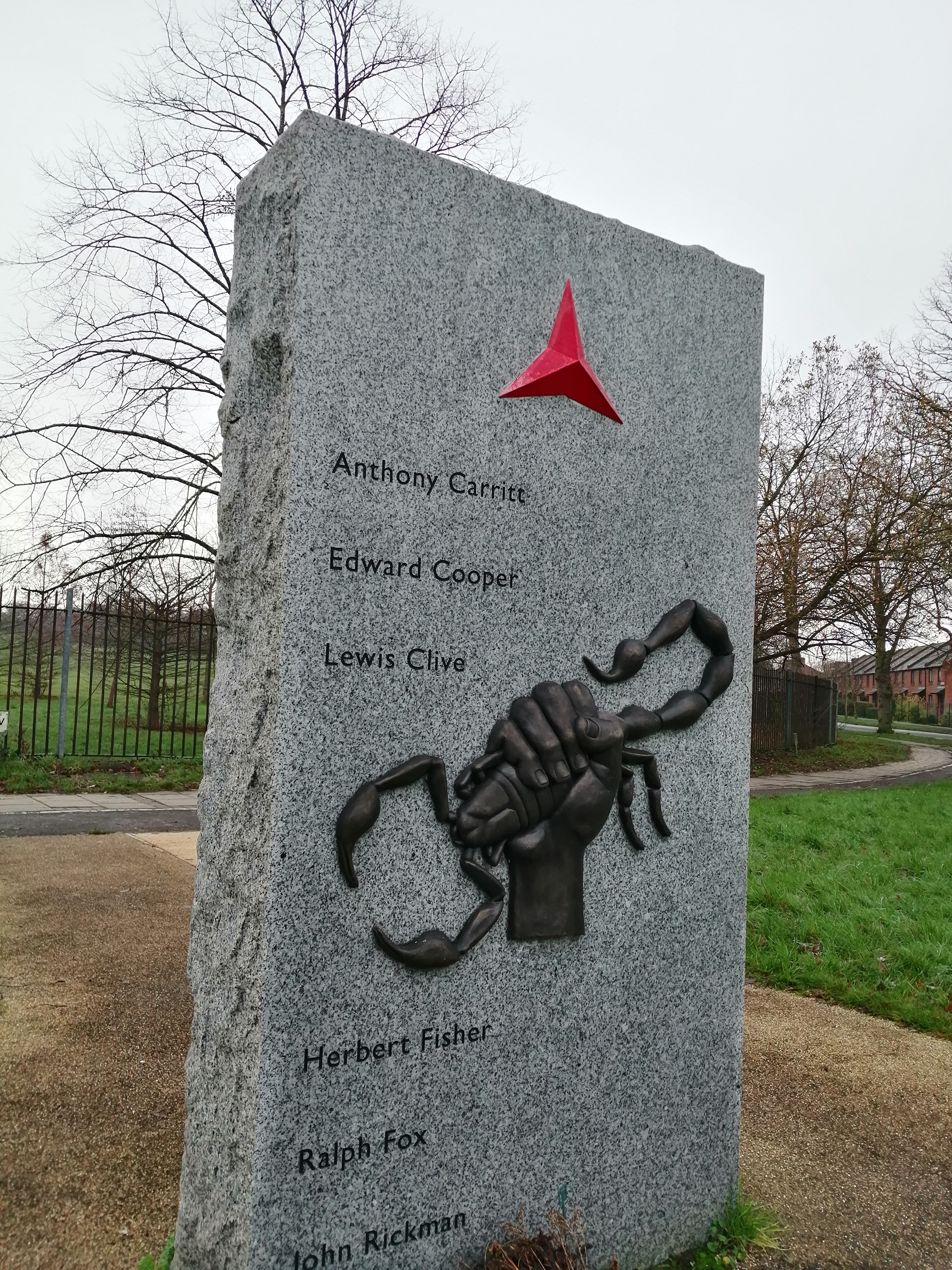
Lewis Clive is named on the Oxford Spanish Civil War memorial, erected in 2017

Clive arrived in Spain on 4 February 1938, where he joined the International Brigades. He took part in the fighting against Nationalist forces in Aragon, where he wielded a heavy machine-gun. He accompanied the Republican volunteers during their retreat across the River Ebro. By July, Clive had risen to the rank of company commander of the International Brigades' British Battalion, and recrossed the river, in what became known as the Battle of the Ebro, as part of the final Republican offensive of the war. He led his soldiers to attack Hill 481, near Gandesa. After five consecutive attacks on Hill 481, Clive led the final charge on 3 August, when he was killed by a shot to his head.

== Memorials ==
Lewis Clive is commemorated on at least three memorials: the first in Ebro, the second in Wormbridge Church near Hereford, and the third in Oxford.

He is named on a memorial in the foothills of the Ebro mountains. This memorial is one of the few not destroyed by Franco's forces, and was restored by local people in 2000.

He is commemorated in St Peter's Church, Wormbridge, Herefordshire, alongside others members of the Clive family.

The Oxford Spanish Civil War memorial, erected in 2017, includes Clive's name and five other people from Oxfordshire who died fighting for the Republicans.

== Legacy ==
A fictionalised version of Clive appeared in Mary Wesley's novel The Camomile Lawn. The character, Oliver Ansty, was portrayed by Toby Stephens in the TV adaptation.

British folk band The Young'uns’ album and stage show The Ballad of Johnny Longstaff mentions Clive, who was a comrade of Johnny Longstaff in the International Brigade. The song "Lewis Clive" is an exaggerated portrayal of Clive’s swimming ability, describes his bravery during the Spanish Civil War and mourns his loss.

== Works ==
- Clive, Lewis (1938). The People's Army. Victor Gollancz Ltd.

== See also ==
- List of Oxford University Boat Race crews
- Ralph Winston Fox
- John Platts-Mills
- Siege of Gandesa (1938)
