= National Nurses Association =

Former trade union of the United Kingdom

The National Nurses Association (also known as the Association of Nurses) was a trade union for British nurses founded by Thora Silverthorne and Nancy Zinkin in 1937.

A campaign to highlight the poor pay and working conditions of nurses was launched with a protest march in London of 1,000 nurses. Silverthorne was attacked by the Royal College of Nursing for "not being a registered nurse" or for being "paid by Moscow". The Nurses Association later amalgamated with the National Union of Public Employees.
