= October Club (Oxford University) =

Communist student club at the University of Oxford in the 1930s

The October Club
- Founded: 1931; 95 years ago (originally); 2022; 4 years ago (officially reconstituted)
- Type: Student political society
- Location: Oxford, United Kingdom
- Website: https://theoctober.club/

The October Club is an independent communist organisation made up of students at University of Oxford, founded in December 1931.

Its stated aim is to 'be a political home for radical students at the university and channel enthusiasm into building a long-term base of student-worker-community power at Oxford'. Alongside communism, it also stresses its commitment to abolition, trans-liberatory feminism, and anti-imperialism.

== History ==
=== 1930s ===
Founded with the object of ‘the study of communism in its world social, economic and cultural aspects’, within its first year it gained some 300 members out of a total population of approximately 5000 undergraduates.

Amongst its founders were Noel Carritt, Frank Meyer and Dick Freeman. Key early members were drawn from the university's small population of Indian students such as Sajjad Zaheer, B.P.L. Bedi and C.S. Subramanyam, who would go onto play notable roles in Indian communist and independence politics (along with fellow Club member Freda Bedi).

Initially, the Club was highly critical of the British Communist Party, but by the Spring of 1932, the Club's core activists (approximately ten) had joined the party.

According to some contemporaries, it was largely a discussion group, attracting speakers such as H. G. Wells, Bernard Shaw, Ivor Montagu, and Shapurji Saklatvala. However, the Club did take part in a number of political actions including organising a delegation to meet hunger marchers passing through Oxford on their journey from Lancashire to London, and participating in violent protests in 1933 against the rise of fascism in Oxford, both in the university and the city.

Such was the violence of this period, that, in 1933, communist and socialist students from Ruskin College founded the anti-fascist Red Shirts and volunteered to act as stewards to defend events held by the October Club. Nonetheless, by the autumn of 1933, the Club was the largest student organisation at the university.

Later in 1933, the Club was banned by the university, ostensibly for its criticism of the Officers' Training Corps, leading to student protests against the decision. The Club remained independently active until 1935, when it was officially dissolved itself into the Labour Club, forming a 'popular front'. The October Club continued as a group within the Labour Club for a number of years.

=== 2020s ===
In Trinity Term 2022, the Club officially re-formed and was recognised by the Student Union with the stated aim to 'be a political home for radical students at the university and channel enthusiasm into building a long-term base of student-worker-community power at Oxford'.

Upon its refounding, it had no affiliation with any national communist or socialist organisation.

In 2024, during protests against the University's ties to Israel's war on Gaza, the Club claimed its members' involvement in violent confrontation with police.

== Notable alumni ==
- Heinz Arndt (economist)
- Freda Bedi (Indian nationalist)
- B.P.L. Bedi (major contributor to the Naya Kashmir constitution)
- Noel Carritt (International Brigades volunteer and member of the Carritt family)
- Jack Dunman (writer and farm-worker unionist)
- Bernard Floud (Labour Party politician, and alleged spy)
- David Floyd (journalist and spy)
- Christopher Hill (historian)
- Denis Healey (Labour Party politician)
- Diana Hopkinson (memoirist)
- François Lafitte (social researcher and abortion lobbyist)
- Frank Meyer (conservative political philosopher)
- Thora Silverthorne (co-founder of the rank-and-file nurses' union, the National Nurses Association)
- Olive Shapley (radio producer and broadcaster)
- R. W. Southern (historian) (non-member, but in regular attendance)
- C.S. Subramanyam (founding member of the Communist Party of India in the south of India)
- Gywn Thomas (novelist)
- Philip Toynbee (writer, and first communist president of the Oxford Union)
- Donald Wheeler (alleged spy)
- Sajjad Zaheer (writer and founding member of the Communist Party of Pakistan) (attended meetings after graduating)

== See also ==
- Battle of Carfax
- Oxford University Labour Club
- Oxford University Liberal Democrats
- Oxford University Conservative Association
- Oxford Union
