= Noel Carritt =

British communist activist

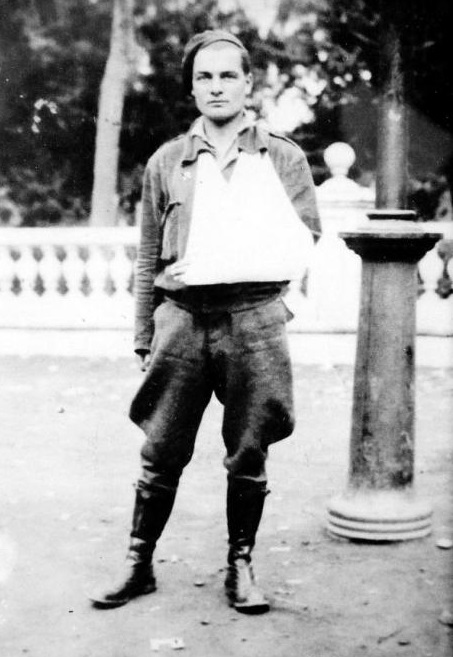
- Noel Carritt injured by shrapnel during the Spanish Civil War
- Born: 1910; Heath Barrows, Boars Hill, Oxfordshire, England
- Died: 1992 (aged 81–82)
- Education: Dragon School; Sedbergh School; Oriel College, Oxford
- Occupations: Biology teacher, aeroplane engineer, ambulance driver, trade union organiser
- Organization: Founding member of the October Club (Oxford University)
- Known for: Communist revolutionary, anti-fascist, member of the International Brigades
- Political party: Communist Party of Great Britain
- Partner(s): Liesel Carritt (1933–1941); Florence Simkins
- Children: 2
- Parents: Edgar Frederick Carritt (father); Winfred Carritt (mother)
- Relatives: Anthony Carritt (brother); Michael Carritt (brother); Bill Carritt (brother); Brian Carritt (brother)

Noel Carritt (1910–1992) was a British communist activist, teacher, and volunteer for the International Brigades. He was born into the Carritt family, known for their Marxist and anti-fascist politics which heavily influenced him. As a young man, he saved German Jewish activist Liesel Carritt from being deported to Nazi Germany by agreeing to enter into a marriage of convenience.

In 1936, Noel Carritt, his wife Liesel, and his brother Anthony, all joined the International Brigades during the Spanish Civil War and took part in battles against the Nationalist forces led by Franco and backed by Hitler and Mussolini. Noel was wounded during the war, and his brother Anthony was killed while serving as an ambulance driver. During the Second World War, he became an engineer with Fairey Aviation, helping to create military aircraft.

== Childhood and background ==
Noel Carritt was born in Heath Barrows, Boars Hill, into the Oxfordshire-based Carritt family, notable for the family's large number of Marxist revolutionaries and academics. He was born one of seven children, the majority of whom became lifelong anti-fascist and socialist activists.

The Carritt family's home in Boars Hill became known as a hub for left-wing intellectual debate, attracting a wide number of people including communist trade union leader Abraham Lazarus, multiple Labour Party politicians including Dick Crossman, the novelist Iris Murdoch, and numerous poets including WH Auden and Stephen Spender. The Carritt family were also friends with another family of left-wing activists which lived close to them called the Thompsons, whose members included the historian E. P. Thompson and his brother Frank Thompson. The children of both families attended the Dragon School together.

== Early adult life ==
Noel Carritt was born in 1910, he was educated at the Dragon School, before attending Sedbergh School in Cumbria.

In 1928, Carritt was accepted into the University of Oxford and studied at Oriel College to study Zoology. During this time, he became a founding member of the October Club, Oxford University's first ever communist society.

During the early 1930s, Noel Carritt and the rest of the Carritt family welcomed and financially supported Jewish refugees arriving in Oxford following the rise of Nazi Germany. He and some acquaintances of his (W. H. Auden and Julian Murray) agreed to enter into marriage of conveniences to stop Jewish refugees from being forcefully deported back to Nazi Germany. Carritt married a German refugee and communist activist called Liesel, whose father was the former editor of Weimar Germany's main liberal newspaper, the Frankfurter Zeitung. Although the marriage began as a method to stop Liesel being deported to Germany, the couple appears to have had an affectionate relationship and bonded through their mutual communist political beliefs. After marriage, he and Liesel left Oxford and moved to Sheffield where he began working as a teacher.

== Spanish Civil War ==
In 1936, the Spanish military under the leadership of fascist leader Francisco Franco, and with support from Adolf Hitler and Benito Mussolini, started a war known as the Spanish Civil War (1936–1939) in an attempt to overthrow the Spanish republican government. To help fight Franco, the International Brigades were created to recruit anti-fascist volunteers from across the world to fight against fascism and help defend the Spanish republican government.

In December 1936, Carritt left his teaching job without notice to join the International Brigades and caught a train to London. While in Victoria station, he wrote a message to his parents written on the back of a cheque that explained his decision to travel to Spain to join the International Brigades.

Carritt's wife Liesel and his brother Anthony Carritt, also decided to join the International Brigades, both of whom took part in battles against fascist forces during the war. At some point during the war, he would befriend the Clem Beckett, known across Europe for his motorsport stunts.

In February 1937, Carritt joined the rest of the British Battalion and fought in the Battle of Jarama, where fascist forces which were far better armed and organised were able to inflict massive casualties upon anti-fascist forces. Of the 500 British volunteers present at the battle, only 160 survived. During the battle he was injured in the hand by shrapnel, before quickly recovering and joining the republican offensive during the Battle of Brunete where his brother Anthony was serving as an ambulance driver. During this time, he followed in his brother's footsteps and also became an ambulance driver. During the battle, his vehicle was hit by fascist aircraft towed to a republican medical centre in Escorial. During this time, he was informed that his brother had gone missing. He spent days searching for his brother, before accepting that Anthony had been killed by fascist forces. Anthony's body was never found.

After the Battle of Brunete, Carritt was moved to Huete where British medical volunteers had established themselves in an old monastery. The administrator of these volunteers happened to be a man called Peter Harrisson who had been his friend when they both lived in Boars Hill. Carritt was appointed the role of political commissar in addition to his driving duties. He used his position as a political commissar to organise 'singsongs' and entertainment for anti-fascist troops. He also served briefly as an assistant anaesthetist under a Dr Jolly, but soon found that he was not suited for this work.

== Return to England ==
The longer Carritt stayed in Spain following his brother's death, the greater the emotional strain on his parents. To alleviate their worries, Carritt applied for leave and in November 1937 he returned to England where he became a trade union organiser for the Trades Union Congress. While visiting a clothing factory in the East End of London, He met a seamstress called Florence Simkins who was working as a shop steward for the Tailor and Garment Workers' Union. Noel Carritt and his wife Liesel mutually decided to divorce in 1941, before he married Florence Simkins later that same year. The couple had two children called Sally and Colin.

== Second World War ==
In 1939, following the outbreak of the Second World War, Carritt attempted to join the Royal Navy. However, many anti-fascist veterans of the Spanish Civil War were denied roles in the military by the British government and treated with suspicion, leading to authorities denying his application to join the Royal Navy.

Carritt then contributed to the British war effort during World War II, he became an engineer with Fairey Aviation, helping to create military aircraft.

== Later life, death, and legacy ==
After WWII, Noel Carritt became the Head of Biology at Dr Challoner's Grammar School in Amersham, Buckinghamshire. He worked until retiring in 1981.

Noel Carritt died in 1992, at Checkendon, Reading, Berkshire.

Archival evidence concerning Noel Carritt is kept by the Marx Memorial Library.

Noel Carritt's son Collin Carritt went on to lead the campaign to create the first-ever memorial to the International Brigades ever built in Oxford. The end result of this campaign was the 2017 unveiling of the Oxford Spanish Civil War memorial.
