= Thora Silverthorne =

Welsh nurse and activist (1910–1999)

- Born: 25 November 1910; Abertillery, Monmouthshire, Wales
- Died: 17 January 1999 (aged 88); London, England
- Occupations: Lifelong activist for Communist Party of Great Britain. Nanny for Somerville Hastings. Nurse in Spanish Civil War. Unionist working for nurses rights
- Political party: Communist Party of Great Britain
- Spouses: Kenneth Sinclair-Loutit, Cameron Nares Craig
- Children: 1 son, 2 daughters
- Family: George Silverthorne (father), Sarah Boyt (mother), 6 or 7 siblings (number disputed)

Thora Silverthorne (25 November 1910 – 17 January 1999), also known as "Red Silverthorne", was a nurse, a healthcare activist, and a lifelong member of the Communist Party of Great Britain (CPGB). She is most known for her service to the International Brigades during the Spanish Civil War, for co-founding Britain's first union for rank-and-file nurses, and for helping to set up the National Health Service (NHS).

== Early life ==
Thora Silverthorne was born into a working-class mining family in Abertillery, Wales on 25 November 1910, to Sarah (née Boyt) and George Silverthorne. She was the fifth of eight children. Her father was an early recruit to the CPGB, an active member of the South Wales Mines Federation, and a coal hewer at the Six Bells Colliery. She grew up in Abertillery and went to Nantyglo Primary School before winning a scholarship to Abertillery Grammar School. She attended Sunday school at the Blaenau Gwent Baptist Chapel.

When Silverthorne's mother died in August 1927, she and her family relocated to Reading, Berkshire.

She joined the Young Communist League at age 16 during the 1926 United Kingdom general strike. Soon afterwards she was chairing meetings with communist trade union leader Arthur Horner, and then she joined the CPGB. Although she held membership in the UK Labour party, she remained a lifelong CPGB member.

During her teenage years in Reading, Silverthorne supported herself by selling the Daily Worker to railway staff. She also worked as a nanny for Somerville Hastings, Reading's Labour Party MP and founder of the Socialist Medical Association (SMA). Hastings was known to have supported Silverthorne's ambition to become a nurse. In March 1931, she started nurse training at the Radcliffe Infirmary in Oxford, where her older sister Olive was already working as a nurse. During the National Hunger March, Silverthorne volunteered as a nurse for Lancashire hunger marchers passing through Oxford. She was prone to "helping herself to bandages and dressings" from the wards of the Radcliffe Infirmary. While at Oxford she was given the nickname "Red Silverthorne" for her communist activities. She became friends there with Marxist historian Christopher Hill, whom she met through the Oxford communist society known as the October Club.

== Participation in the Spanish Civil War ==
In October 1934, Silverthorne left Oxford and completed her medical training in London. By 1936 she had taken her first post, at the Hammersmith Hospital where she met founding member of the Spanish Medical Aid Committee (SMAC), Dr Charles Wortham Brook. That same year she joined SMAC, a decision which she described as "the prime and best and most important decision I've made in my life". In October 1936, she travelled to Spain alongside photographer Alec Wainman as part of the British Medical Unit, the first-ever foreign medical unit from any country to travel to Spain and serve the Spanish republican government.

After arriving in Spain, she was involved in the creation of the first British hospital in Spain during the Spanish Civil War, established near Grañén. She was later elected the chief nurse and matron of this hospital. British International Brigadier Michael Livesey died of his injuries while in Silverthorne's arms, a memory which haunted her the rest of her life. During her time in Spain, she met Kenneth Sinclair-Loutit, whom she married in 1937. She worked closely with Dr. Archie Cochrane, who praised her for her professional expertise in medicine. After Silverthorne's death in 1999, declassified British archives showed that throughout her Spanish Civil War service, she was being closely monitored by British government spies, who had intercepted her mail and monitored her telephone.

== Later and professional life ==
She returned to Britain in September 1937, where she lived in a flat in 12 Great Ormond Street in London. According to historian Liz Woolley, Silverthorne "went on to have a distinguished career which changed the nursing profession to a remarkable degree", and also became the sub-editor for Nursing Illustrated. Deeply influenced by her experiences in Spain, she made it her "life work" to improve the pay, conditions and professional standing of British nurses.

With the help of communist nurses, she and activist Nancy Blackburn co-founded the National Nurses Association, the first trade union that represented ordinary rank-and-file nurses. This nurses union gained significant attention from the British press, which it used to highlight the poor pay and working conditions for nurses. In response to her socialist beliefs and the radical politics of the National Nurses Association, the Royal College of Nursing attacked Silverthorne for allegedly "not being a registered nurse", and also claimed she was being "paid by Moscow". Silverthorne became the Organising Secretary of the Socialist Medical Association (SMA) in July 1942, making her their first employee. As the Secretary of the SMA, she led a delegation that met Clement Attlee to give proposals for setting up a National Health Service. She was a full-time union official of the Civil Service Clerical Association until she retired in 1970.

== Personal life ==
After returning from Spain with her new husband Kenneth Sinclair-Loutit (whom she married in 1937), they lived together at 12 Great Ormond Street and had one daughter, Christina Ruth (1940–2009), later adopted by her second husband Cameron Nares Craig. Silverthorne divorced Sinclair-Loutit and in 1946 married the architect and fellow Communist Party member Cameron Nares Craig (1917–2012). They had one son and one daughter Lucy and Jonathan. They lived for 25 years at Lletyreos near Llanfyllin, Powys for 25 years before returning to London in 1995.

She was also a friend of Arthur Horner, Clive Jenkins, and Frank Cousins. She was chosen to greet Pablo Picasso during his visit to the UK.

Thora Silverthorne died in London in January 1999, having suffered from Alzheimer's disease. She was commemorated with a funeral service in Marylebone Cemetery. The Welsh hymn "Land of My Fathers", as performed in English by Paul Robeson, was played during the service. In 2022 she was honoured with a Purple Plaque in Abertillery.

== See also ==
- Charlie Hutchison
- Ralph Winston Fox
- Bill Alexander
- GCT Giles
- British Battalion
- Communist Party of Great Britain
