= Communist Party of Great Britain =

Political party in the United Kingdom (1920–1991)

- Abbreviation: CPGB
- General Secretary: Albert Inkpin (first); Nina Temple (last)
- Founded: 31 July 1920
- Dissolved: 23 November 1991
- Merger of: 1920 Congress: British Socialist Party; Communist Unity Group; Socialist Labour Party; South Wales Socialist Society; 1921 Congress: Communist Labour Party; Communist Party (BSTI)
- Succeeded by: Legal successor: Democratic Left; Communist Party of Britain (Via Young Communist League); Communist Party of Scotland (Factions in Scotland); Non-legal successors: Communist Party of Britain (Marxist–Leninist); New Communist Party of Britain; Working People's Party of England; Communist Party of Great Britain (Provisional Central Committee)
- Headquarters: Marx House, Covent Garden, London
- Newspaper: Morning Star (Note: Called The Daily Worker from 1930 to 1966); Marxism Today (Note: Theoretical magazine)
- Student wing: Communist Students
- Youth wing: Young Communist League (YCL)
- Membership: 60,000 (at peak; 1945); 4,742 (at dissolution; 1991)
- Ideology: Communism; Marxism–Leninism; Britain's Road to Socialism; Faction, later majority: Eurocommunism
- Political position: Far-left
- International affiliation: Comintern
- Channel Islands Affiliates: Jersey Communist Party; Communist Party of Guernsey
- Other Affiliates: West African National Secretariat; National Minority Movement (1924–1929); Popular Front (UK) (1936–1940)

The Communist Party of Great Britain (CPGB) was the largest Marxist-Leninist organisation in Britain and was founded in 1920 through a merger of several smaller Marxist groups. The party first gained prominence when many miners joined the CPGB in the 1926 general strike. In 1930, the CPGB founded the Daily Worker newspaper (renamed the Morning Star in 1966), which would remain the party's main publication throughout its existence. In 1936, members of the party were present at the Battle of Cable Street, helping organise resistance against the British Union of Fascists. In the Spanish Civil War, the CPGB worked with the USSR to create the British Battalion of the International Brigades, which party activist Bill Alexander commanded.

In World War II, the CPGB followed the Comintern position, initially opposing, but later supporting, the war in line with the involvement of the USSR. By the end of World War II, CPGB membership had nearly tripled and the party reached the height of its popularity. Many key CPGB members served as leaders of Britain's trade union movement, including Jessie Eden, David Ivon Jones, Abraham Lazarus, Ken Gill, Clem Beckett, GCT Giles, Mike Hicks, and Thora Silverthorne.

The CPGB's position on racial equality and anti-colonialism attracted many black activists to the party, including Trevor Carter, Charlie Hutchison, Dorothy Kuya, Billy Strachan, Peter Blackman, George Powe, Henry Gunter, Len Johnson, and Claudia Jones, who founded London's Notting Hill Carnival. In 1956, the CPGB experienced a significant loss of members due to its support of the Soviet military intervention in Hungary. In the 1960s, CPGB activists supported Vietnamese communists fighting in the Vietnam War. In 1984, the leader of the CPGB's youth wing, Mark Ashton, founded Lesbians and Gays Support the Miners.

From 1956 until the late 1970s, the party was funded by the Soviet Union. After the dissolution of the Soviet Union in 1991, the party's Eurocommunist leadership disbanded the party, establishing Democratic Left. In 1988, the anti-Eurocommunist and Marxist-Leninist faction launched the Communist Party of Britain, which still exists today.

== History ==
=== Formation ===
The Communist Party of Great Britain was founded on 31 July 1920 at a Communist Unity Convention held at the Cannon Street hotel in London. The Third International decided that greater attempts should be made to establish communist parties across the world. The CPGB was formed by the merger of several smaller Marxist parties, including the British Socialist Party, the Communist Unity Group of the Socialist Labour Party and the South Wales Socialist Society. Of the delegates sent to the conference, a large number of them were from the British Socialist Party and the Communist Unity Group. The party also gained the support of the Guild Communists faction of the National Guilds League, assorted shop stewards' and workers' committees, socialist clubs and individuals and many former members of the Hands Off Russia campaign. Several branches and many individual members of the Independent Labour Party also affiliated. As a member of the British Socialist Party, the Member of Parliament Cecil L'Estrange Malone joined the CPGB. A few days after the founding conference the new party published the first issue of its weekly newspaper, which was called the Communist and edited by Raymond Postgate.

In January 1921, the CPGB a second congress was held in Leeds., and the party was refounded. The majorities of Sylvia Pankhurst's group the Communist Party (British Section of the Third International), and the Scottish Communist Labour Party joined during this congress. The party benefited from a period of increased political radicalism in Britain just after the First World War and the Russian Revolution of October 1917, and was also represented in Britain by the Red Clydeside movement.

During the negotiations leading to the initiation of the party, a number of issues were hotly contested. Among the most contentious were the questions of "parliamentarism" and the attitude of the Communist Party to the Labour Party. "Parliamentarism" referred to a strategy of contesting elections and working through existing parliaments. It was a strategy associated with the parties of the Second International and was opposed by those who wanted to break with Social Democracy. They contended that parliamentarism had caused the old parties to become devoted to reformism because it had encouraged them to place more importance on winning votes than on working for socialism, that it encouraged opportunists and place-seekers into the ranks of the movement and that it constituted an acceptance of the legitimacy of the existing governing institutions of capitalism. Similarly, affiliation to the Labour Party was opposed on the grounds that communists should not work with 'reformist' Social Democratic parties. These Left Communist positions enjoyed considerable support, including from Sylvia Pankhurst and Willie Gallacher. However, the Russian Communist Party took the opposing view. In 1920, Vladimir Lenin argued in his essay "Left Wing" Communism: An Infantile Disorder that the CPs should work with reformist trade unions and social democratic parties because these were the existing organisations of the working class. Lenin argued that if such organisations gained power, they would demonstrate that they were not really on the side of the working class, thus workers would become disillusioned and come over to supporting the Communist Party. Lenin's opinion prevailed eventually.

Initially, therefore, the CPGB attempted to work within the Labour Party, which at this time operated mainly as a federation of left-wing bodies, only having allowed individual membership since 1918. However, despite the support of James Maxton, the Independent Labour Party leader, the Labour Party decided against the affiliation of the Communist Party in 1921. Even while pursuing affiliation and seeking to influence Labour Party members, however, the CPGB promoted candidates of its own at parliamentary elections.

Following the refusal of their affiliation, the CPGB encouraged its members to join the Labour Party individually and to seek Labour Party endorsement or help for any candidatures. Several Communists thus became Labour Party candidates, and in the 1922 general election, Shapurji Saklatvala and Walton Newbold were both elected. As late as 1923 the National Executive Committee of the Labour Party endorsed Communist parliamentary candidates, and 38 Communists attended the 1923 Labour Party Conference.

=== 1920s and 1930s ===
In 1923, the party renamed its newspaper as the Workers Weekly. In 1923, the Workers' Weekly published a letter by J. R. Campbell urging British Army soldiers not to fire on striking workers. The Labour government of Prime Minister Ramsay MacDonald prosecuted him under the Incitement to Disaffection Act but withdrew the charges upon review. This led to the Liberal Party introducing a motion to establish an inquiry into the Labour government, which led to its resignation.

The affair of the forged Zinoviev Letter occurred during the subsequent general election late October 1924. Intended to suggest that the Communist Party in Britain was engaged in subversive activities among the British Armed Forces and elsewhere, the forgery's aim was to promote the electoral chances of the Conservative Party in the general election of 29 October; it was probably the work of SIS (MI6) or White Russian counter-revolutionaries.

After Labour lost to the Conservative Party in the election, it blamed the Zinoviev Letter for its defeat. In the aftermath of the Campbell Case and the Zinoviev letter, Labour expelled Communist Party members and banned them from running as its parliamentary candidates in the future. After the 1926 British general strike, it also disbanded 26 Constituency Labour Parties which resisted the ruling or were otherwise deemed too sympathetic to the Communist Party.

Throughout the 1920s and most of the 1930s, the CPGB decided to maintain the doctrine that a communist party should consist of revolutionary cadres and not be open to all applicants. The CPGB as the British section of the Communist International was committed to implementing the decisions of the higher body to which it was subordinate.

This proved to be a mixed blessing in the General Strike of 1926 immediately prior to which much of the central leadership of the CPGB was imprisoned. Twelve were charged with "seditious conspiracy". Five were jailed for a year and the others for six months. Another major problem for the party was its policy of abnegating its own role and calling upon the General Council of the Trades Union Congress to play a revolutionary role.

Nonetheless, during the strike itself and during the long drawn-out agony of the following Miners' Strike, the members of the CPGB were to the fore in defending the strike and in attempting to develop solidarity with the miners. The result was that membership of the party in mining areas increased greatly through 1926 and 1927. Many of these gains would be lost during the Third Period, but the influence was developed in certain areas that would continue until the party's demise decades later.

The CPGB did succeed in creating a layer of militants very committed to the party and its policies, although this support was concentrated in particular trades, specifically in heavy engineering, textiles and mining, and in addition, tended to be concentrated regionally too in the coalfields, certain industrial cities such as Glasgow and in Jewish East London. Indeed, Maerdy in the Rhondda Valley along with Chopwell in Tyne and Wear were two of a number of communities known as Little Moscow for their Communist tendencies.

During the 1920s, the CPGB clandestinely worked to train the future leaders of India's first communist party. Some of the key activists charged with this task, Philip Spratt and Ben Bradley, were later arrested and convicted as a part of the Meerut Conspiracy Case. Their trial helped to raise British public awareness of British colonialism in India, and caused massive public outrage over their treatment. At the same time, Asian and African delegates to the Comintern such as Ho Chi Minh, M. N. Roy, and Sen Katayama criticized the GBCP for neglecting colonial issues in India and Ireland.

But this support built during the party's first years was imperilled during the Third Period from 1929 to 1932, the Third Period being the so-called period of renewed revolutionary advance as it was dubbed by the (now Stalinised) leadership of the Comintern. The result of this "class against class" policy, adopted in late 1927, was that the Social Democratic and Labourite parties were seen as just as much a threat as the fascist parties and were therefore described as being social-fascist. Any kind of alliance with "social-fascists" was obviously to be prohibited.

The Third Period also meant that the CPGB sought to develop revolutionary trade unions in rivalry to the established Trades Union Congress affiliated unions. They met with an almost total lack of success although a tiny handful of "red" unions were formed, amongst them a miners union in Scotland and tailoring union in East London. Arthur Horner, the Communist leader of the Welsh miners, fought off attempts to found a similar union on his patch.

But even if the Third Period was by all conventional standards a total political failure it was the 'heroic' period of British communism and one of its campaigns did have impact beyond its ranks. This was the National Unemployed Workers' Movement led by Wal Hannington. Increasing unemployment had caused a substantial increase in the number of CP members, especially those drawn from engineering, lacking work. This cadre of which Hannington and Harry MacShane in Scotland were emblematic, found a purpose in building the NUWM which resulted in a number of marches on the unemployment issue during the 1930s. Although born in the Third Period during the Great Depression, the NUWM was a major campaigning body throughout the Popular Front period too, only being dissolved in 1941.

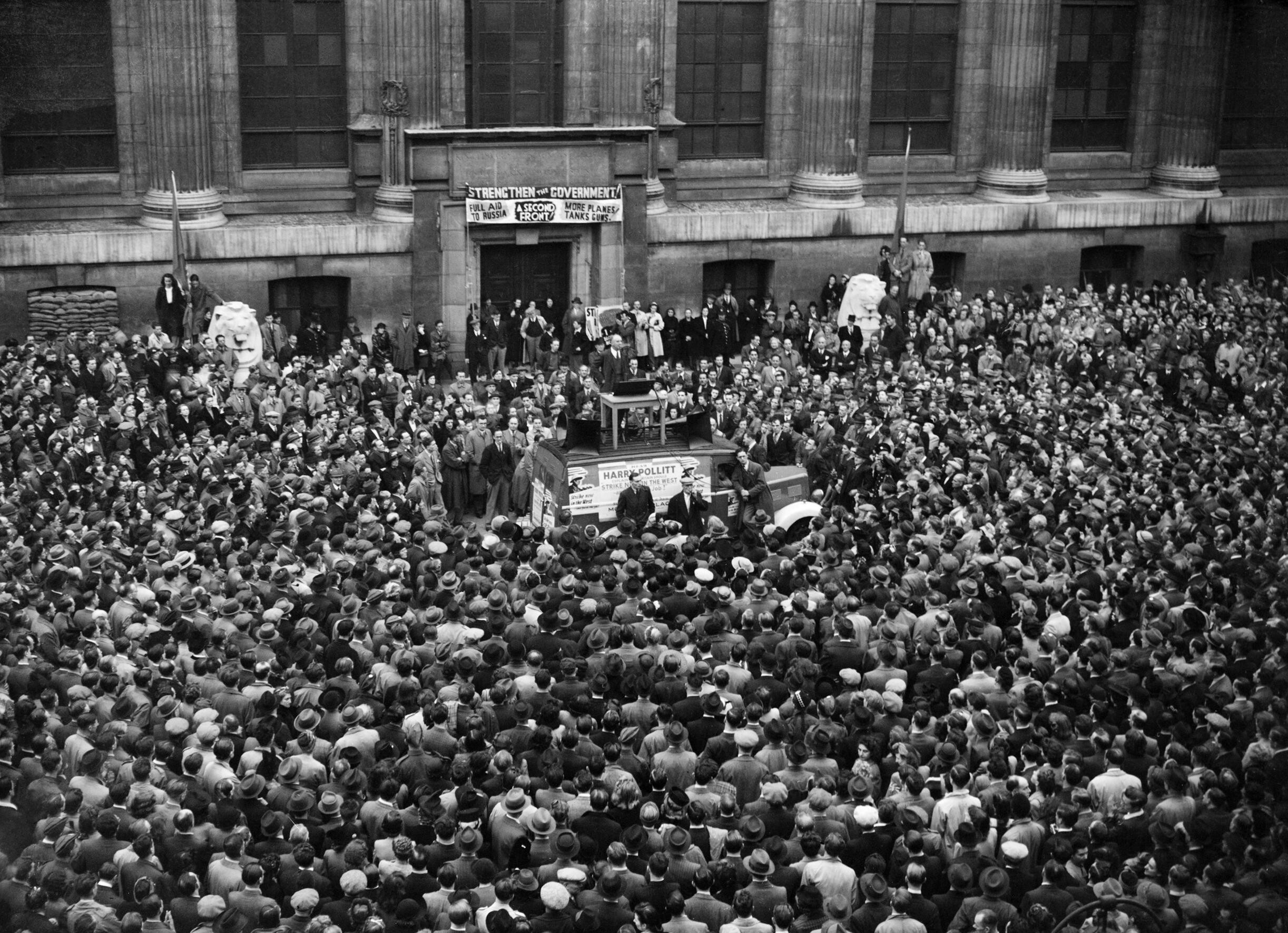
The CPGB's General Secretary, Harry Pollitt, gives a speech to a large crowd outside the British Museum in support for the Aid to Russia Fund, 1941

The Third Period was dropped by all Communist Parties in 1935 in favour of Popular Front tactics. This policy argued that as fascism was the main danger to the workers' movement, it needed to ally itself with all anti-fascist forces including non-socialist progressives and social democrats.,

In the 1935 general election Willie Gallacher was elected as the Communist Party's first MP in six years, and their first MP elected against Labour opposition. Gallacher sat for West Fife in Scotland, a coal mining region in which it had considerable support. During the 1930s the CPGB opposed the National Government's European policy of appeasement towards Nazi Germany and Fascist Italy. On the streets the party members played a leading role in the struggle against the British Union of Fascists, led by Sir Oswald Mosley whose Blackshirts tried to emulate the Nazis in anti-Semitic actions in London and other major British cities. The Communist Party's Oxford branch under the leadership of Abraham Lazarus managed to successfully contain and defeat the rise of fascism in the city of Oxford, forcing the Blackshirts to retreat from the town and into the relative safety of Oxford University after the Battle of Carfax.

=== 1939–1945: Second World War ===
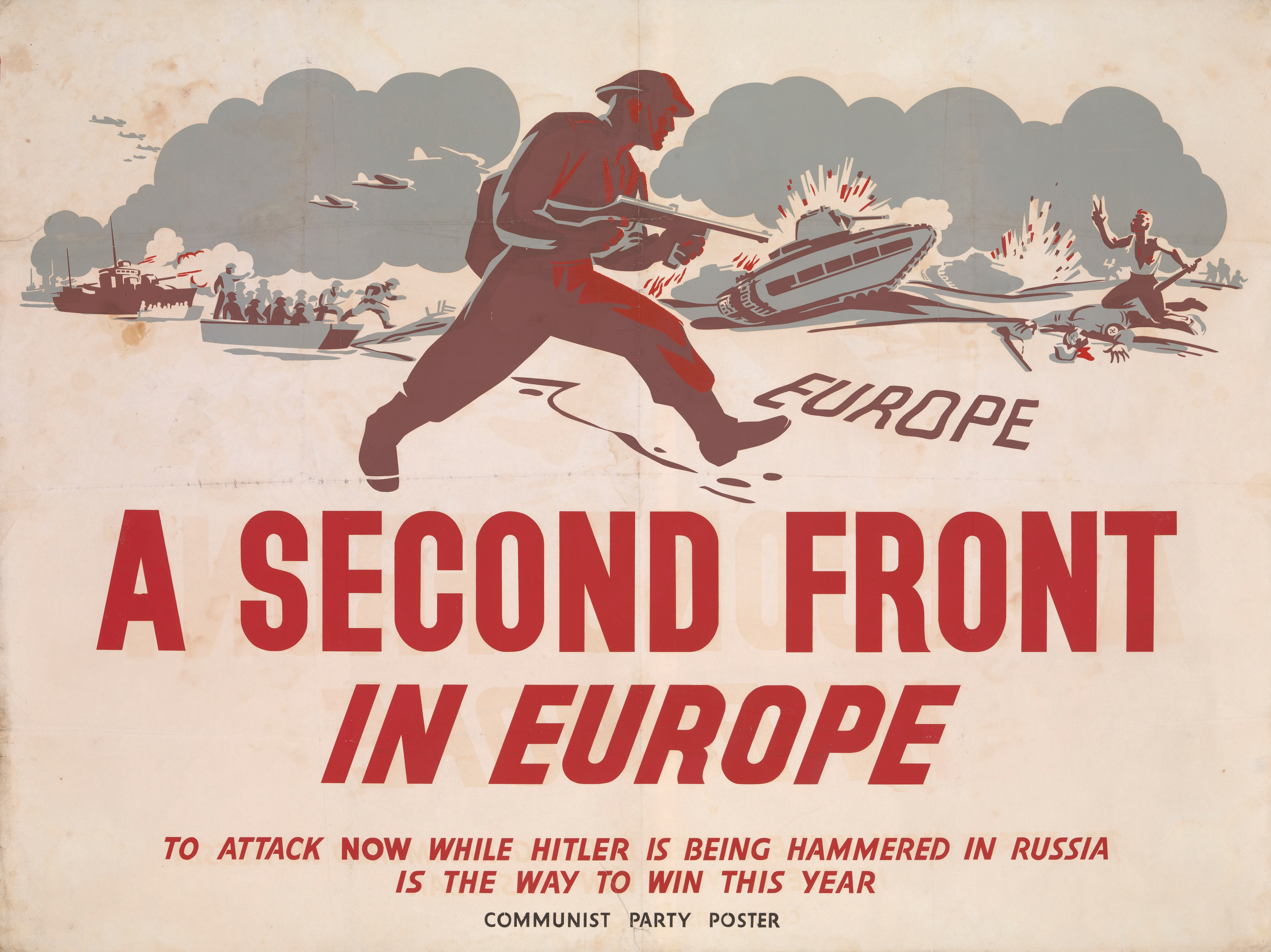
CPGB poster supporting the British war effort against Nazi Germany during WWII

With the beginning of the Second World War in 1939, the CPGB initially continued to support the struggle on two fronts (against Chamberlain at home and Nazi fascism abroad). Following the Molotov–Ribbentrop nonaggression pact on 23 August between the Soviet Union and Germany, the Comintern changed its position, describing the war as the product of imperialism on both sides, in which the working class had no side to take. The CPGB central committee followed the directive, changing to an anti-war stance. This change was opposed by Harry Pollitt and J. R. Campbell, the editor of the Daily Worker, and both were relieved of their duties in October 1939. Pollitt was replaced by Palme Dutt. From 1939 until 1941 the CPGB was very active in supporting strikes and in denouncing the government for its pursuit of the war.

However, on 22 June 1941, when the Soviet Union was invaded by Germany, the CPGB issued a statement calling for support and solidarity with the Soviets. The party began supporting the war on the grounds of defence of the Soviet Union against fascism. Pollitt was restored to his former position as Party Secretary. The party then launched a campaign for a Second Front in order to support the USSR and speed the defeat of the Axis powers. In industry, they now opposed strike action and supported the Joint Production Committees, which aimed to increase productivity, and supported the National Government that was led by Winston Churchill (Conservative) and Clement Attlee (Labour). At the same time, given the influence of Rajani Palme Dutt in the Party, the issue of Indian independence and the independence of colonies was emphasised.

In the 1945 general election, the Communist Party received 103,000 votes, and two Communists were elected as members of parliament: Willie Gallacher of West Fife was returned, and Phil Piratin was newly elected as the MP for Mile End in London's East End. Harry Pollitt failed by only 972 votes to take the Rhondda East constituency. Both Communist MPs, however, lost their seats in the 1950 general election. The Party was keen to demonstrate its loyalty to Britain's industrial competitiveness as a stepping point towards socialism. At the 19th Congress, Harry Pollitt asked rhetorically, "Why do we need to increase production?" He answered: "To pay for what we are compelled to import. To retain our independence as a nation."

The party's membership peaked during 1943, reaching around 60,000. Despite boasting some leading intellectuals, especially among the Communist Party Historians Group, the party was still tiny compared to its continental European counterparts. The French Communist Party for instance had 800,000 members, and the Italian Communist Party had 1.7 million members, before Benito Mussolini outlawed it in 1926. The Party tried, unsuccessfully, to affiliate to the Labour Party in 1935, 1943 and 1946.

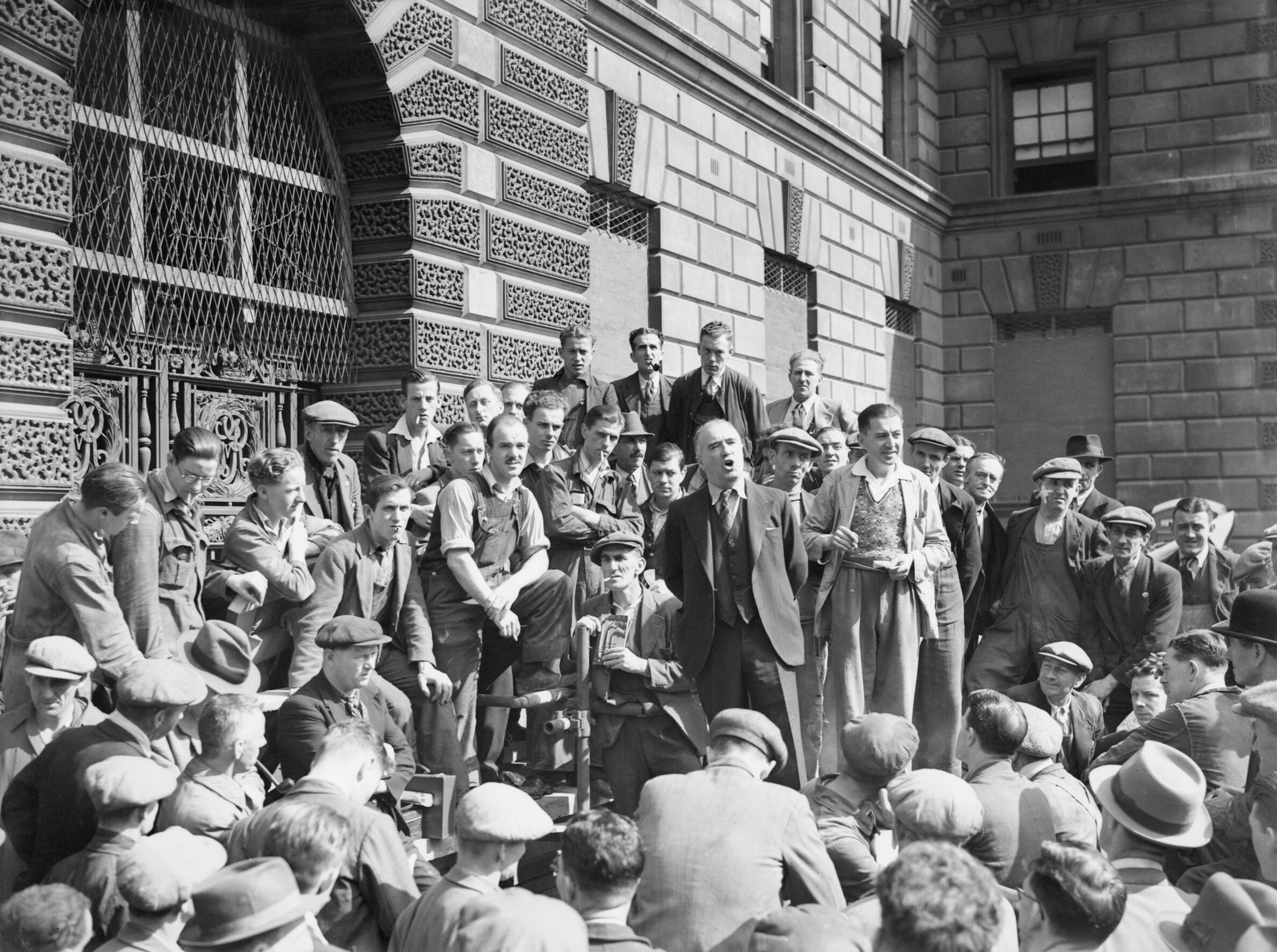
Harry Pollitt gives a speech to workers in Whitehall, London, 1941

=== 1946–1956: Start of the Cold War ===
In 1951, the party issued a programme, The British Road to Socialism (officially adopted at the 22nd Congress in April 1952), which explicitly advocated the possibility of a peaceful transition to socialism – but only after it had been personally approved by Joseph Stalin himself, according to some historians. The BRS would remain the programme of the CPGB until 1989.

From the war years to 1956 the CPGB was at the height of its influence in the labour movement with many union officials who were members. Not only did it have immense influence in the National Union of Mineworkers but it was extremely influential in the Electrical Trade Union and in the Amalgamated Union of Engineering Workers, a key blue-collar union. In addition, much of the Labour Party left was strongly influenced by the party. Dissidents were few, perhaps the most notable being Eric Heffer, the future Labour MP who left the party in the late 1940s.

In 1954, the party solidified its opposition to British racial segregation, with the publication of A Man's a Man: A Study of the Colour Bar in Birmingham. Although the Communists had always opposed both racial segregation and British colonialism, this publication made clearer the party's position, and also had an enduring influence on British anti-racist politics outside the party.

The death of Stalin in 1953, and the uprising in East Germany the same year had little direct influence on the CPGB, but they were harbingers of what was to come. Of more importance was Nikita Khrushchev's "Secret Speech" at the 20th Congress of the Communist Party of the Soviet Union, in which he denounced Stalin. According to George Matthews, Khrushchev made a deal with the CPGB to provide a secret annual donation to the party of more than £100,000 in used notes. The Poznań protests of 1956 disrupted not only the CPGB, but many other Communist Parties as well. The CPGB was to experience its greatest ever loss of membership as a result of the Warsaw Pact's crushing of the 1956 Hungarian Revolution. "[T]he events of 1956 ... saw the loss of between one-quarter and one-third of Party members, including many leading intellectuals." This event was initially covered in the CPGB-sponsored Daily Worker, by correspondent Peter Fryer, but as events unfolded the stories were spiked. On his return to Britain Fryer resigned from the Daily Worker and was expelled from the party.

=== 1957 to 1970s: Decline of the party ===
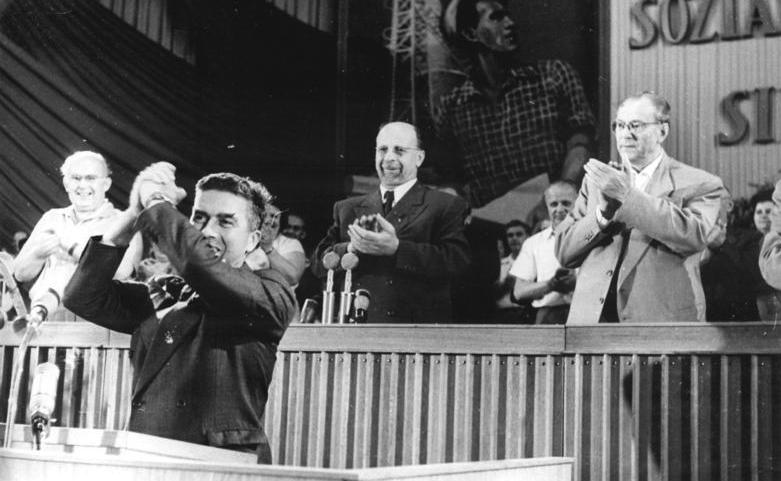
William Alexander, representing to Politburo of the CPGB receives applause from the Presidium of the Fifth Congress of the Socialist Unity Party of Germany, East Berlin, 16 July 1958.

After the calamitous events of 1956, the party increasingly functioned as a pressure group, seeking to use its well-organised base in the trade union movement to push the Labour Party leftwards. Trade unionists in the party in 1968 included John Tocher, George Wake, Dick Etheridge and Cyril Morton (AEU); Mick McGahey, Arthur True and Sammy Moore (NUM); Lou Lewis (UCATT) and Max Morris (NUT). Ken Gill became the party's first elected officer (Deputy General Secretary of DATA, later TASS) in 1968 and former party member Hugh Scanlon was elected president of the AEU with Broad Left support – defeating Reg Birch, the Maoist ex-party candidate. The Broad Left went on to help elect Ray Buckton (ASLEF), Ken Cameron (FBU), Alan Sapper (ACTT) and Jack Jones (TGWU) in 1969. Gerry Pocock, Assistant Industrial Organiser described the industrial department as "a party within a party", and Marxism Today editor James Klugmann would routinely defer to Industrial Organiser Bert Ramelson on matters of policy.

The party's orientation, though, was to the left union officers, not the rank and file. Historian Geoff Andrews explains "it was the role of the shop stewards in organising the Broad Lefts and influencing trade union leaders that were the key rather than organising the rank and file in defiance of leaderships", and so the party withdrew from rank-and-file organisations like the Building Workers' Charter and attacked "Trotskyist" tactics at the Pilkington Glass dispute in 1970.

Still the party's efforts to establish an electoral base repeatedly failed. They retained a handful of seats in local councils scattered around Britain, but the CPGB's only representative in Parliament was in the House of Lords, gained when Wogan Philipps, the son of a ship-owner and a long-standing member of the CPGB inherited the title of Lord Milford when his father died in 1963.

The Daily Worker was renamed the Morning Star in 1966. At the same time, the party became increasingly polarised between those who sought to maintain close relations with the Soviet Union and those who sought to convert the party into a force independent of Moscow.

The Sino-Soviet split that began to entrench divisions between the two largest communist countries in 1961 led to divisions within many Communist Parties, but there was little pro-Beijing sympathy in the relatively small British Party. Perhaps the best known of the tiny minority of CPGB members who opposed the Moscow line was Michael McCreery, who formed the Committee to Defeat Revisionism, for Communist Unity and acted as the co-editor of the Vanguard editorial. This tiny group left the CPGB by 1963. McCreery himself died in New Zealand in 1965. Later a more significant group formed around Reg Birch, an engineering union official, established the Communist Party of Britain (Marxist-Leninist). Initially, this group supported the position of the Chinese Communist Party during the Sino-Soviet split.

Divisions in the CPGB concerning the autonomy of the party from rule from Moscow reached a crisis in 1968 when Warsaw Pact forces invaded Czechoslovakia. The CPGB, with memories of 1956 in mind, responded with some very mild criticism of Moscow, refusing to call it an outright invasion, preferring "intervention". Three days after the invasion, John Gollan said "we completely understand the concern of the Soviet Union about the security of the socialist camp ... we speak as true friends of the Soviet Union".

In the late 1960s, and probably much earlier, MI5 had hidden surveillance microphones in the CPGB's headquarters, which MI5 regarded as "very productive".

Even this response provoked a small localised split by the so-called Appeal Group which was in many respects a precursor of the 1977 split which formed the New Communist Party. From this time onwards, the most traditionally-minded elements in the CPGB were referred to as 'Tankies' by their internal opponents, due to their support of the Warsaw Pact forces. Others within the party leaned increasingly towards the position of Eurocommunism, which became the leading tendency within the Communist parties of Italy, Spain and France in the 1970s.

The last strong electoral performance of the CPGB was in the February 1974 General Election in Dunbartonshire Central, where candidate Jimmy Reid won almost 6,000 votes. However, this strong result was primarily a personal vote for Reid, who was a prominent local trade union leader and gained much support because of his prominent role in the Upper Clyde Shipbuilders work-in, which had taken place a few years earlier and was seen as having saved local jobs. Nationally the party's vote continued its decline: according to a contemporary joke, the CPGB at this time pursued the British Road to Lost Deposits.

According to historian Geoff Andrews, "The mid-1970s saw Gramscians" (otherwise known as Euro-Communists) "take leading positions within the party". Dave Cook became National Organiser in 1975 and Sue Slipman was appointed to the executive committee and to the Marxism Today editorial board. Jon Bloomfield, former Student Organiser became the West Midlands District Secretary. Pete Carter prominent in UCATT, had been gaining influence since the late 60s and was appointed National Industrial Organiser in 1982. Beatrix Campbell (a contributor, with Slipman, to Red Rag) and Judith Hunt became active in the National Women's Advisory Committee. Martin Jacques, on the executive committee since 1967, replaced James Klugmann as editor of Marxism Today in 1977. Its turn to Eurocommunism was prefigured by what Andrews describes as Sarah Benton's "radical and heretical" stint as editor of the fortnightly review Comment. Critics from the past, like Eric Hobsbawm and Monty Johnstone, also gained influence.

Divisions were most apparent at this time due to conflict over the party's unconditional support for trade unionism. At the 1975 Congress, economist Dave Purdy proposed that "the labour movement should declare its willingness to accept voluntary pay restraint as a contribution to the success of the programme and a way of easing the transition to a socialist economy" – a challenge to the Industrial Department's policy of "free collective bargaining". An argument he reiterated in print in The Leveller in 1979.

The growing crisis in the party also affected the credibility of its leadership, as formerly senior and influential members left its ranks. In 1976, three of its top engineering cadres resigned. Jimmy Reid, Cyril Morton and John Tocher had all been members of the Political Committee, playing a crucial role in determining the direction of the party. Like another engineer, Bernard Panter, who left a few months before them, they jumped a sinking ship.

According to the Party's official historian, this period was marked by a growing division between the practitioners of cultural politics – heavily inspired by the writings of Antonio Gramsci and party's powerful industrial department which advocated a policy of militant labourism.

The cultural politics wing had dominated the party's youth wing in the 1960s and was also powerful in the student section. As such many of its members were academics or professional intellectuals (or in the view of their opponents, out of touch and middle class). They were influenced by the environmental and especially the feminist movement.

The other wing was powerful in senior levels of the trade union movement (though few actually reached the very top in the unions) and despite the party's decline in numbers were able to drive the TUC's policy of opposing the Industrial Relations Act. In the view of their opponents on the cultural or Eurocommunist wing, they were out of touch with the real changes in working people's lives and attitudes.

As the seventies progressed and as industrial militancy declined in the face of high unemployment, the tensions in the party rose even as its membership continued to decline.

=== 1977–1991: Infighting and dissolution ===
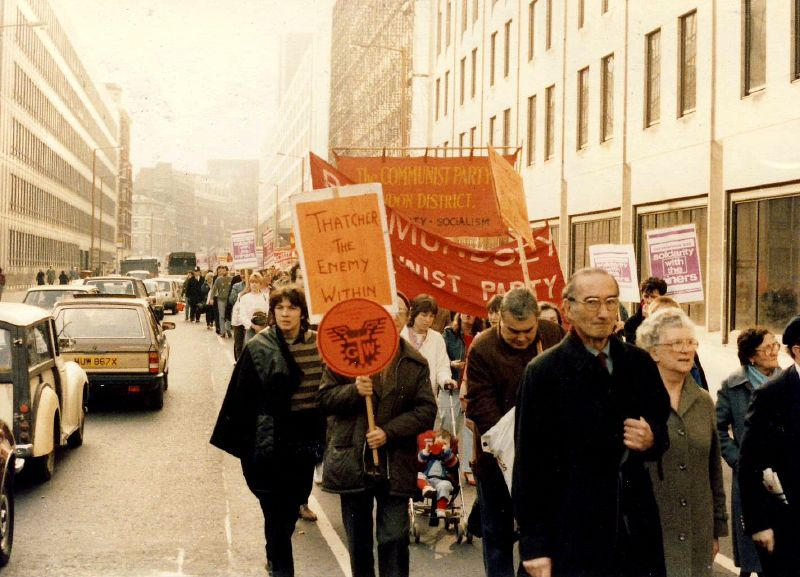
Miners' strike rally in 1984

By 1977, debate around the new draft of the British Road to Socialism brought the party to breaking point. Many of the anti-Eurocommunists decided that they needed to form their own anti-revisionist Communist party. Some speculated at the time that they would receive the backing of Moscow, but such support appears not to have materialised.

In July 1977, the Surrey District split away and formed the New Communist Party of Britain, taking 65 branches but only 2 per cent of the 25,300 membership at the time.

Another grouping, led by Fergus Nicholson, remained in the party and launched the paper Straight Left. This served as an outlet for their views as well as an organising tool in their work within the Labour Party. Nicholson had earlier taken part in establishing a faction known as "Clause Four" within Labour's student movement. Nicholson wrote as "Harry Steel", a combination of the names of Stalin ("man of steel" in Russian) and Harry Pollitt. The group around Straight Left exerted considerable influence in the trade union movement, CND, the Anti-Apartheid Movement and amongst some Labour MPs.

Under the influence of Eric Hobsbawm on the Eurocommunist wing of the party, Martin Jacques became the editor of the party's theoretical journal Marxism Today. Hobsbawn had theorised in 1978, that trade unions' focus on wage demands had divided the working class, a thought which became popular among the Eurocommunists. Jacques rapidly turned the publication into an outlet for Eurocommunist opinions, including tendencies in the wider liberal-left, and the soft left around Neil Kinnock in the Labour Party. Although the circulation of the magazine rose it was still a drain on the finances of the small party.

As early as 1983, Martin Jacques "thought the CP was unreformable ... but stayed in because he needed its subsidy to continue publishing Marxism Today." Jacques' conviction that the party was finished "came as a nasty shock to some of his comrades" like Nina Temple, who "as unhappy as Jacques himself, stayed on only out of loyalty to Jacques."

In 1984, a long-simmering dispute between the majority of the leadership and an anti-Eurocommunist faction (associated with party industrial and trade union activists) flared up when the London District Congress was closed down for insisting on giving full rights to comrades who had been suspended by the executive committee. After the General Secretary closed the Congress a number of members remained in the room (in County Hall in South London) and held what was, in effect, the founding meeting of a breakaway party, although the formal split did not come until four years later. Members of the minority faction set about founding a network of Morning Star readers' groups and similar bodies, calling themselves the Communist Campaign Group. In 1988, these elements formally split from the CPGB to organise a new party known as the Communist Party of Britain. This was considered by many in the anti-Eurocommunist faction, including national executive members like Barry Williams, to be the death of the 'Party'.

Following the 1989 Tiananmen Square protests and massacre, Marxism Today's July 1989 issue declared that Leninism was dead, with its October issue stating that the Revolutions of 1989 had created crises for communism and socialism. At the 41st Congress of the party, the CPGB approved of "the process of reform and democratisation in the European Socialist countries." The congress also involved discussing the future options for the party, including liquidation, merging and name changing.

After the August Coup, the CPGB (going by the Communist Party in Transformation at this point) published a statement on 19 August in support of "all democratic forces in their resistance to the unconstitutional and undemocratic actions of the Deputy President and his supporters." This was then followed by the CPGB leadership advocating for Communist Party of the Soviet Union members to leave the party due to it being "totally discredited" by being "deeply implicated" in the coup. Hobsbawm reasoned in Marxism Today that Gorbachev was the person "who destroyed a clumsy but operational economy and replaced it with a void, where there is no longer bread. Perestroika did not fail; it did not happen".

In 1991, following the Dissolution of the Soviet Union, the leadership of the party recommended adopting the title Democratic Left and moving towards a decentralised branch structure, which was accepted at the 42nd Party Congress held in November 1991. At the 43rd Congress the leadership of the CPGB, led by Nina Temple, decided to disband the party.

== Legacy ==
The Democratic Left itself dissolved in 1999 and was replaced by the New Politics Network, which in turn merged with Charter 88 in 2007. This merger formed Unlock Democracy, which was involved in the campaign for a yes vote in the 2011 Alternative Vote referendum.

Historian John Callaghan has argued that the CPGB was in clear decline before Mikhail Gorbachev came to power in the Soviet Union. This is reasoned to be because of rampant factionalism present in the party, and the loss of the party's base due to deindustrialisation which was not replaced.

Some Scottish members formed the Communist Party of Scotland, while others formed Democratic Left Scotland and Democratic Left Wales Chwith Ddemocrataidd. Supporters of The Leninist who had rejoined the CPGB in the early 1980s declared their intention to reforge the Party and held an emergency conference at which they claimed the name of the party. They are now known as the Communist Party of Great Britain (Provisional Central Committee) and they publish the Weekly Worker. But the Communist Party of Britain is the designated 'Communist Party' in the UK by the Electoral Commission. In 2008 members of the Party of the European Left, which contains several former communist parties in Europe, established a non-electoral British section.

== Size and electoral information ==
The party began with 4000 members at its founding congress. It experienced a brief surge around the 1926 general strike, doubling its membership from 5,000 to over 10,000. This surge was short-lived, however, as membership eventually sank down to 2,350 by 1930. The party reached its peak in 1942 at 56,000 members. This reflected the popularity of the party in the active phase of the Second World War. In the post-war period, the membership began declining, culminating in the sudden loss of around 6,000 members in 1957, around the aftermath of the Soviet intervention in Hungary. From that point, the party gradually recovered into the early 1960s; however, it began slowly shrinking again in 1965. The downward trend continued until the leadership pushed for the dissolution of the party in 1991. The final congress recorded an overall figure of 4,742 members.

=== Membership size ===
==== Demographics of membership ====
During the 1930s, and especially after the formation of the BUF, the party began to attract a significant amount of Jewish voters and activists under its wing, though it is argued that without this the party would have gained Jewish voters regardless. The party made a deliberate effort during this period to attract Jewish voters to their cause, holding meetings in predominately Jewish areas, in an intention to build up localised support in 'Little Moscows'. Henry Srebrnik argues that the Jewish vote for the party became an "ethno-ideological movement" culminating in the success in the 1945 Mile End election. It also attracted other ethnic minorities during this period, hosting "disproportionately on groups falling outside (...) of the majority population". This Jewish support for the party retained itself even after the Molotov-Ribbontrop Pact.

By the late 1940s and 1950s, 7-10% of its activist base and 33% of district party secretaries were Jewish, where it is estimated that 1 in every 100 British Jews were members of the party in this period. In its biggest individual branch of Stepney in 1945, of around 1,000 members, 50% were Jewish. A significant chunk of these British Jewish activists hailed from Austria and Germany and were the "single largest contingent of foreign-born Jewish communists in the CPGB".

After the war, the Jewish activist base entered a decline in total numbers as the Jewish population of east London migrated to north and west London but despite this however, in 1965, 10% of the party's membership were still estimated to be Jewish.

==== District membership ====
Membership by region from 1926-1944
Region	Year					
Region	1926 (after the General Strike)	1937	1940 (March)	1942 (March)	1942 (September)	1944 (December)
London	1,560	2,450 (March)	8,000	15,500	23,000	18,360
Scotland	1,507	2,000 (June)	over 3,000	6,120	5,572 (June)	8,738
Lancashire	680	1,285 (May)	2,000	5,000	5,748	5,819
The Midlands	326	n/a	1,000	4,000	5,891	3,381
South Wales	1,500	n/a	n/a	2,064	2,881	2,729
Yorkshire	1,200	n/a	1,000	1,154 (West Riding)	4,283	2,725 (March)

=== General election results ===
House of Commons of the United Kingdom
Election year	# of total votes	% of overall vote	# of seats won
1922	30,684 ▲	0.2% ▲	1 ▲
1923	34,258▲	0.2%	0 ▼
1924	51,176 ▲	0.2%	1 ▲
1929	47,554 ▼	0.2%	0 ▼
1931	69,692 ▲	0.3% ▲	0
1935	27,177 ▼	0.1% ▼	1 ▲
1945	97,945 ▲	0.4% ▲	2 ▲
1950	91,765 ▼	0.3% ▼	0 ▼
1951	21,640 ▼	0.1% ▼	0
1955	33,144 ▲	0.1%	0
1959	30,896 ▼	0.1%	0
1964	46,442 ▲	0.2% ▲	0
1966	62,092 ▲	0.2% ▲	0
1970	37,970▼	0.1% ▼	0
1974 (Feb.)	32,743 ▼	0.1%	0
1974 (Oct.)	17,426 ▼	0.1%	0
1979	16,858 ▼	0.1%	0
1983	11,606 ▼	0.0% ▼	0
1987	6,078 ▼	0.0%	0

==== List of elected MPs ====
- Walton Newbold (Motherwell, 1922–23)
- Shapurji Saklatvala (Battersea North, 1922–23 with Labour support, 1924–29)
- Willie Gallacher (West Fife, 1935–50)
- Phil Piratin (Mile End, 1945–50)

== General secretaries ==
General Secretary (Birth–Death)	Took office	Left office	Prime Minister (term)
Albert Inkpin (1884–1944)	31 July 1920	July 1928 (Note: Inkpin was imprisoned twice during his time as General Secretary. From May 1921, when he was placed on a highly restrictive bail, until August 1922, shortly after his release, Fred Peet was Acting General Secretary. From 22 October 1925, when he was one of twelve leading communists to be arrested, until his release in late September 1926, Bob Stewart was Acting General Secretary.)	Lloyd George 1916–22
Albert Inkpin (1884–1944)	31 July 1920	July 1928	Law 1922–23
Albert Inkpin (1884–1944)	31 July 1920	July 1928	Baldwin 1923–24
Albert Inkpin (1884–1944)	31 July 1920	July 1928	MacDonald 1924
Albert Inkpin (1884–1944)	31 July 1920	July 1928	Baldwin 1924–29
J. R. Campbell (1894–1969)	February 1929 (Note: Although Campbell does not usually appear on lists of General Secretaries of the CPGB, Matthew Worley's Class Against Class: The Communist Party in Britain Between the Wars details how Campbell became the party's leading figure with the title "Political Secretary" in July 1928. This was changed to "General Secretary" in February 1929, then back to "Political Secretary" in May 1929, now subordinate to Pollitt.)	May 1929	Baldwin 1924–29
Harry Pollitt (1890–1960) (1st time)	July 1929 (Note: Pollitt assumed the leading role in the party in May 1929 with the title of "Organisational Secretary"; he became General Secretary in July 1929.)	October 1939	MacDonald 1929–35
Harry Pollitt (1890–1960) (1st time)	July 1929	October 1939	Baldwin 1935–37
Harry Pollitt (1890–1960) (1st time)	July 1929	October 1939	Chamberlain 1937–40
Rajani Palme Dutt (1896–1974)	October 1939	June 1941	Chamberlain 1937–40
Rajani Palme Dutt (1896–1974)	October 1939	June 1941	Churchill 1940–45
Harry Pollitt (1890–1960) (2nd time)	June 1941	13 May 1956	Churchill 1940–45
Harry Pollitt (1890–1960) (2nd time)	June 1941	13 May 1956	Attlee 1945–51
Harry Pollitt (1890–1960) (2nd time)	June 1941	13 May 1956	Churchill 1951–55
Harry Pollitt (1890–1960) (2nd time)	June 1941	13 May 1956	Eden 1955–57
John Gollan (1911–1977)	13 May 1956	11 March 1975	Eden 1955–57
John Gollan (1911–1977)	13 May 1956	11 March 1975	Macmillan 1957–63
John Gollan (1911–1977)	13 May 1956	11 March 1975	Douglas-Home 1963-4
John Gollan (1911–1977)	13 May 1956	11 March 1975	Wilson 1964–70
John Gollan (1911–1977)	13 May 1956	11 March 1975	Heath 1970–74
John Gollan (1911–1977)	13 May 1956	11 March 1975	Wilson 1974–76
Gordon McLennan (1924–2011)	11 March 1975	13/14 January 1990	Wilson 1974–76
Gordon McLennan (1924–2011)	11 March 1975	13/14 January 1990	Callaghan 1976–79
Gordon McLennan (1924–2011)	11 March 1975	13/14 January 1990	Thatcher 1979–90
Nina Temple (1956–)	13/14 January 1990	23 November 1991	Thatcher 1979–90
Nina Temple (1956–)	13/14 January 1990	23 November 1991	Major 1990–97

== Congresses ==
The congresses appointed/elected the Executive Committee.

Year	Name	Location	Dates
1920	Foundation Congress	Cannon Street Hotel, London; International Socialist Club, London	31 July – 1 August
1921	2nd Congress	Victory Hotel, Leeds	29–30 January
1921	3rd Congress	Manchester	23–24 April
1922	4th Congress	St Pancras Town Hall, London	18–19 March
1922	5th Congress	Battersea Town Hall, London	7–8 October
1924	6th Congress	Caxton Hall, Salford	16–18 May
1925	7th Congress	St Mungo Hall, Glasgow	30 May – 1 June
1926	8th Congress	Battersea Town Hall, London	16–17 October
1927	9th Congress	Caxton Hall, Salford	8–10 October
1929	10th Congress	Bermondsey Town Hall, London	19–22 January
1929	11th Congress	Leeds	30 November – 3 December
1932	12th Congress	Battersea Town Hall, London	12–15 November
1935	13th Congress	Manchester	2–5 February
1937	14th Congress	Battersea Town Hall, London	29–31 May
1938	15th Congress	Birmingham Town Hall, Birmingham	16–19 September
1943	16th Congress	London	3–4 October
1944	17th Congress	Shoreditch Town Hall, London	28–29 October
1945	18th Congress	Seymour Hall, London	24–26 November
1947	19th Congress	Seymour Hall, London	22–24 February
1948	20th Congress	Seymour Hall, London	21–23 February
1949	21st Congress	Liverpool	26–28 November
1952	22nd Congress	Battersea Town Hall, London	11–14 April
1954	23rd Congress	Battersea Town Hall, London	16–19 April
1956	24th Congress	Battersea Town Hall, London	30 March – 2 April
1957	25th Congress	Hammersmith Town Hall, London	19–22 April
1959	26th Congress	St Pancras Town Hall, London	27–30 March
1961	27th Congress	St Pancras Town Hall, London	31 March – 3 April
1963	28th Congress	St Pancras Town Hall, London	12–15 April
1965	29th Congress	Camden Town Hall, London	27–30 November
1967	30th Congress	Camden Town Hall, London	25–28 November
1969	31st Congress	Camden Town Hall, London	15–18 November
1971	32nd Congress	Camden Town Hall, London	13–16 November
1973	33rd Congress	Camden Town Hall, London	10–12 November
1975	34th Congress	Camden Town Hall, London	15–18 November
1977	35th Congress		12–15 November
1979	36th Congress	St Pancras Assembly Room, London	10–13 November
1981	37th Congress	Camden Centre, London	14–17 November
1983	38th Congress		12–15 November
1985	39th Congress		18–20 May
1987	40th Congress		14–17 November
1989	41st Congress		25–28 November
1990	42nd Congress		8–9 December
1991	43rd Congress	Congress House, London	22–24 November

== Notable members ==
- Sam Aaronovitch
- Vic Allen
- Surat Alley
- Bill Alexander
- Kingsley Amis
- Robert Page Arnot
- Mark Ashton
- George Alfred Barnard
- Joan Beauchamp
- Kay Beauchamp
- Clem Beckett
- Tom Bell
- Alfreda Benge
- Leila Berg
- J. D. Bernal
- John Biggs-Davison
- Bill Bland
- Anthony Blunt
- Jim Bollan
- Edith Bone
- Bessie Braddock
- Benjamin Francis Bradley
- Laurence Bradshaw
- Noreen Branson
- Peter Brearey
- Maurice Brinton
- Guy Burgess
- Emile Burns
- Alan Bush
- Beatrix Campbell
- John Ross Campbell
- Trevor Carter
- Christopher Caudwell
- Frank Chapple
- Bernard Coard
- Ken Coates
- Rose Cohen
- Dave Cook
- Robert Conquest
- John Cornford
- Maurice Cornforth
- Bob Crow
- Christian Darnton
- Jack Dash
- Hugh Sykes Davies
- Edmund Dell
- George Derwent Thomson
- Maurice Dobb
- Mary Docherty
- Malcolm Dunbar
- Rajani Palme Dutt
- Jessie Eden
- Ben Fine
- Stewart Farrar
- Charles Fletcher-Cooke
- Ralph Winston Fox
- Sid French
- Peter Fryer
- Gerry Gable
- Willie Gallacher
- Green Gartside
- David Gascoyne
- GCT Giles
- Percy Glading
- Robert Griffiths
- David Guest
- J. B. S. Haldane
- Wal Hannington
- Jock Haston
- Denis Healey
- Charlie Hutchison
- Gerry Healy
- Eric Heffer
- Margot Heinemann
- Mike Hicks
- Jim Higgins
- Christopher Hill
- Jeanne Hoban
- Eric Hobsbawm
- David Holbrook
- Edward Hollamby
- Malcolm Hulke
- Allen Hutt
- Douglas Hyde
- Albert Inkpin
- Thomas A. Jackson
- Martin Jacques
- Len Johnson
- Claudia Jones
- David Ivon Jones
- Lewis Jones
- Pat Jordan
- Yvonne Kapp
- Luke Kelly
- Helena Kennedy
- Arnold Kettle
- Victor Kiernan
- James Klugmann
- Dorothy Kuya
- Charles Lahr
- Edgar Lansbury
- John Lawrence
- Norman Le Brocq
- Doris Lessing
- Hyman Levy
- John Lewis
- Sam Lilley
- Eddie Linden
- Jack Lindsay
- James Litterick
- John Lyons
- Ewan MacColl
- Hugh MacDiarmid
- Arthur MacManus
- Mick McGahey
- Claude McKay
- Paddy Roe McLaughlin
- Donald Maclean
- Gordon McLennan
- Harry McShane
- Charles Madge
- John Madge
- Cecil L'Estrange Malone
- John Manifold
- Tom Mann
- Carl Marzani
- William Mellor
- Susan Michie
- Ivor Montagu
- A. L. Morton
- Iris Murdoch
- J. T. Murphy
- Andrew Murray
- David Nicholson
- Walton Newbold
- Melita Norwood
- Sanzo Nosaka
- Alan Nunn May
- Sylvia Pankhurst
- Betty Papworth
- William Paul
- Wogan Philipps, 2nd Baron Milford
- Phil Piratin
- Harry Pollitt
- Raymond Postgate
- Annie Powell
- Tom Quelch
- Bert Ramelson
- Jimmy Reid
- John Reid
- Al Richardson
- Edgell Rickword
- Michael Roberts
- Archibald Robertson
- Andrew Rothstein
- George Rudé
- Ralph Russell
- William Rust
- Shapurji Saklatvala
- Raphael Samuel
- John Saville
- Hugh Scanlon
- Stephen Sedley
- Alfred Sherman
- Thora Silverthorne
- Brian Simon
- Roger Simon, 2nd Baron Simon of Wythenshawe
- Derek Simpson
- Cliff Slaughter
- Sue Slipman
- John Maynard Smith
- Michael John Smith
- John Sommerfield
- Ken Sprague
- Philip Spratt
- Hedi Stadlen
- Billy Strachan
- Randall Swingler
- Tilda Swinton
- A. J. P. Taylor
- Michael Tippett
- E. P. Thompson
- Alan Thornett
- Dona Torr
- Philip Toynbee
- David Triesman
- Alexander Tudor-Hart
- Julian Tudor-Hart
- Edward Upward
- Freda Utley
- J. O. N. Vickers
- Alister Watson
- Dorothy Wedderburn
- Sarah Wesker
- Harry Wicks
- Ellen Wilkinson
- Raymond Williams
- Alan Winnington
- Tom Wintringham
- Robert Wyatt

== Origins of the term "Tankie" ==
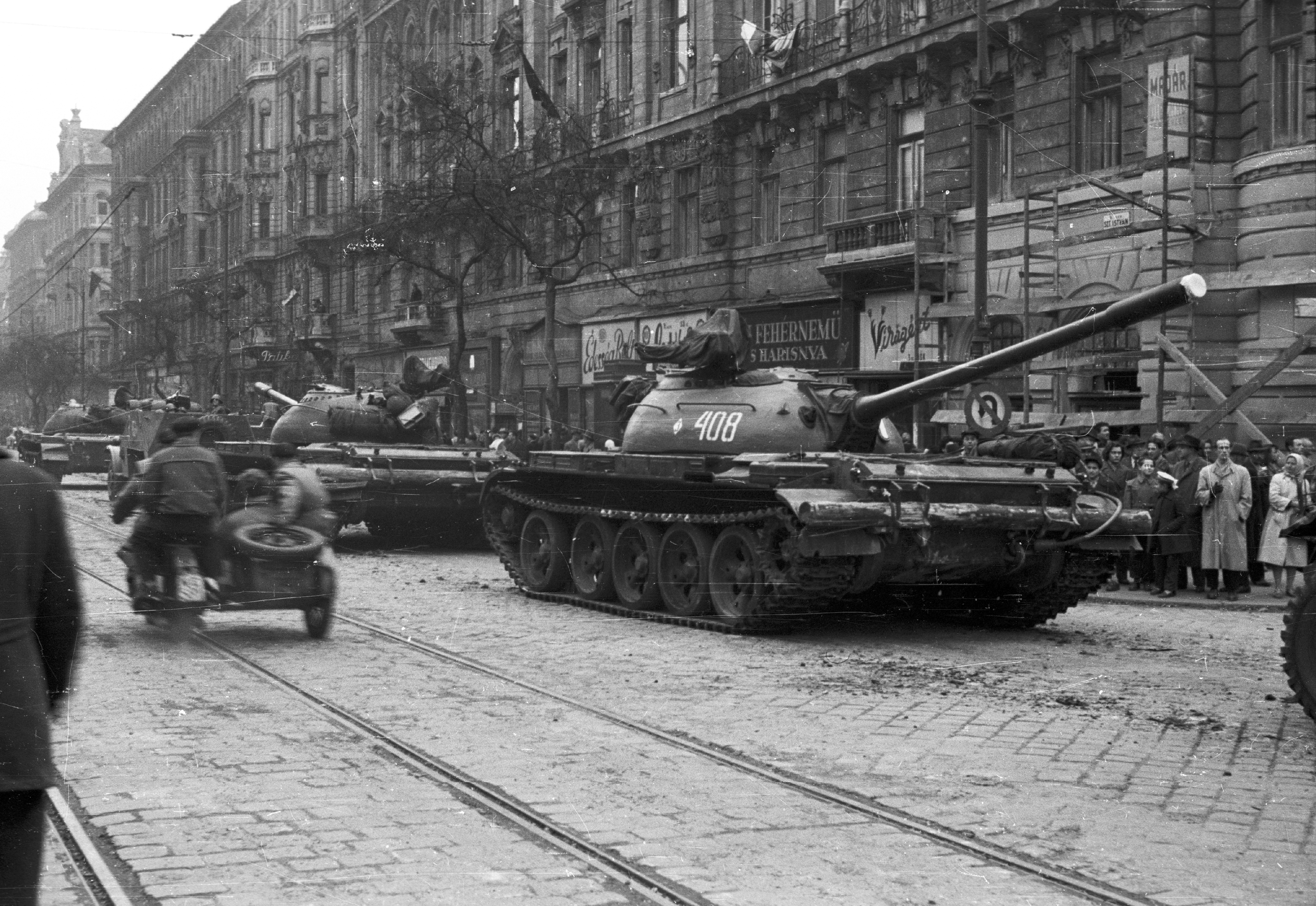
Red Army T-54 tanks in Budapest, 1956.

"Tankie" is a pejorative term referring to those members of the Communist Party of Great Britain who followed the Kremlin line, agreeing with the crushing of the revolution in Hungary and later the Prague Spring by Soviet tanks; or more broadly, those who followed a traditional pro-Soviet position.

The term originated as a phrase for British hardline members of the Communist Party. Journalist Peter Paterson asked Amalgamated Engineering Union official Reg Birch about his election to the CPGB Executive after the Hungarian invasion:

When I asked him how he could possibly have sided with the "tankies", so called because of the use of Russian tanks to quell the revolt, he said "they wanted a trade unionist who could stomach Hungary, and I fitted the bill." (Note: Reg Birch's hardline attitudes later led him to split away from the CPGB to form a pro-Albanian Maoist party.)

The support of the invasion of Hungary was disastrous for the party's credibility. The CPGB opposed the invasion of Czechoslovakia in 1968, though a hardline faction supported it. The party's newspaper, the Morning Star, was banned in the Warsaw Pact countries during that time, as the paper opposed the invasion.

The term is currently used in a somewhat broader sense in Internet slang to refer to any practitioner of far-left politics, especially Marxism–Leninism or Maoism, and particularly those who refute the accusations of authoritarianism and human rights abuses of certain Marxist states, such as the former Soviet Union, China, Cuba and Vietnam.

== Bibliography ==
- Branson, Noreen (1985). History of the Communist Party of Great Britain, 1927–1941. London: Lawrence and Wishart. ISBN 978-0853158042.
- Branson, Noreen (1997). History of the Communist Party of Great Britain, 1941–1951. London: Lawrence and Wishart. ISBN 978-0853159063.
- Callaghan, John (2003). Cold War, Crisis and Conflict: The CPGB 1951–68. London: Lawrence and Wishart. ISBN 978-0853159773.
- Croucher, Richard (1982). Engineers at War. Merlin Press. ISBN 978-0850362701.
- Eadon, James; Renton, Dave (2002). The Communist Party of Great Britain since 1920. Basingstoke: Palgrave. ISBN 978-0333738818.
- Fyrth, Jim (1985). Britain, Fascism and the Popular Front. London: Lawrence and Wishart. ISBN 978-0853157595.
- Hannington, Wal (1967). Never On Our Knees. London: Lawrence & Wishart.
- Klugmann, James (1968). History of the Communist Party of Great Britain, Volume One: Formation and Early Years, 1919–1924. London: Lawrence and Wishart.
- Klugmann, James (1969). History of the Communist Party of Great Britain, Volume Two: The General Strike, 1925–1926. London: Lawrence and Wishart.
- Linehan, Thomas (2007). Communism in Britain, 1920–39: From the Cradle to the Grave. Manchester University Press. ISBN 978-0719071409.
- Macfarlane, L. J. (1966). The British Communist Party: Its Origin and Development until 1929. London: MacGibbon and Kee.
- Macintyre, Stuart (1980). Little Moscows: Communism and Working-Class Militancy in Inter-war Britain. London: Croom Helm. ISBN 978-0856644498.

== See also ==
- Communist Party of Britain
- Communist Party of Britain (Marxist-Leninist)
- Communist Party of Great Britain (Marxist–Leninist)
- Communist Party of Great Britain (Provisional Central Committee)
- Leiston Communist Party
- Communist Students
- Revolutionary Communist Party of Britain (Marxist–Leninist)
- Young Communist League
- Leninade
