= Clem Beckett =

British communist and motor sports pioneer (1906–1937)

- Clem Beckett (1928)
- Born: 1906; England
- Died: 12 February 1937 (aged 30–31); Arganda Bridge, Jarama valley, Spain
- Cause of death: Killed during fighting against Spanish nationalists
- Other name: "Dare Devil Beckett"
- Citizenship: United Kingdom
- Occupations: Blacksmith, speedway racer, factory worker, mechanic, ambulance driver, machine gunner
- Organization(s): International Brigades, British Battalion, Dirt Track Riders' Association
- Known for: Motorsports pioneer, British communist activism, trade union leadership, anti-fascism
- Notable work: "Bleeding the men who risk their lives on the dirt track" - Daily Worker article
- Political party: Communist Party of Great Britain (CPGB); Young Communist League (YCL)
- Spouse: Leda (wife)
- Awards: Golden Helmet

Clem Beckett (1906 – 12 February 1937) was a British communist, trade union leader, champion speedway rider, and pioneer of Motorcycle speedway sports. He was the winner of the Golden Helmet at Owlerton Stadium, and was famous throughout Europe for his motorsport stunts. In response to the numerous deaths of young speedway racers, Beckett founded the Dirt Track Riders' Association, a trade union catering to speedway racers. In 1936 he became one of the first British volunteers to join the International Brigades during the Spanish Civil War. He was killed at the age of 31 while manning a machine gun, sacrificing himself to cover the retreat of fellow British volunteers during the Battle of Jarama.

== Early life ==
Born in Oldham, England in the year 1906, Clement Henry Beckett was raised in a working-class family and became a blacksmith after leaving school. Around the age of 20 he joined the Young Communist League (YCL), the youth branch of the Communist Party of Great Britain (CPGB), becoming a lifelong member of both organisations and dedicating his life outside of sports to communist party activism. Despite being a skilled tradesman, he was often victimised and discriminated against due to his trade union activism. He was sacked from the Ford plant in Dagenham after arguing with a foreman.

== Sports career ==
Beckett's motorsport career started in 1928, Audenshaw, when motor racing sports was in its infancy. He was saved from unemployment due to his unique skills as a rider on Wall of death shows. He soon became known as "Dare Devil Beckett", and worked as a speedway racer for the London-based team White City. By the end of his first year as a speedway racer, he became one of Britain's leading race drivers. His fame quickly spread across Europe, and in the year 1929 alone, he performed at racing events and displays in Germany, Yugoslavia, Turkey, Denmark, and France. On 30 March 1929, Beckett and fellow stars Jimmy Hindle and Spencer 'Smoky' Stratton, opened Sheffield's first speedway track. The three sank their savings into purchasing land in Owlerton Meadows, which they operated under the name Provincial Dirt-Tracks Ltd, today known as Owlerton Stadium. Beckett then won the Golden Helmet award at Owlerton Stadium while performing to an audience of 15,000 spectators.

Angered by the exploitation of racing sports workers and by the numerous deaths of young and inexperienced drivers, Beckett founded a union for speedway racers called the Dirt Track Riders' Association. Further protesting against the deaths of sports drivers, he wrote an article for the British communist newspaper the Daily Worker titled "Bleeding the men who risk their lives on the dirt track". This article led to him being blacklisted from the sport by the Auto-Cycling Union, who represented the promoters of the sport. Undeterred by being blacklisted from many jobs in motor sports, he inaugurated Sheffield's Wall of death and became an exhibition rider.

Clem Beckett's founding of the Dirt Track Riders' Association

“When speedway was first introduced to this country many greyhound stadium owners jumped on the bandwagon. Young kids were persuaded to race irrespective of their experience and many were killed or seriously injured. Clem Beckett… played a major part in setting up a trades union for riders that stopped this lethal exploitation.”

— David Hallam,

In 1931, Beckett toured Europe, including Germany where he witnessed the rise of Germany's fascist movement. In 1932, he visited the Soviet Union as a part of the British Workers' Sports Federation Delegation. However, despite Beckett's attempts to promote motorsports to the Soviets, there would not be any real progress in the sport in the Soviet Union until after World War II.

Upon returning from the Soviet Union, Beckett had difficulty finding work due to being blacklisted and applied for work back at the Ford factory in Dagenham, hoping to put his skills as a mechanic to use. Despite being a skilled mechanic, he only lasted two weeks at the factory, being one of the first workers to attempt to unionise the factory's workers and publicise the dangerous working conditions.

In 1932, Beckett took part in the Mass trespass of Kinder Scout, in what is today the Peak District National Park.

Again attempting to put his skills as a mechanic to professional use, Beckett opened his own motorcycle sale and repair shop in Oldham Road, Manchester.

== Spanish Civil War and death ==
A lifelong communist activist, trade unionist, and having already experienced fascism after witnessing the rise of Nazism in Germany, Beckett sided with the Second Spanish Republic against the fascist backed Spanish nationalists during the Spanish Civil War. Of the approximately 2,500 British volunteers who went to fight for the Second Spanish Republic during the war, the majority were recruited by the Communist Party of Great Britain (CPGB), the same political party that Beckett had supported his entire adult life. Clem Beckett was one of the first British volunteers to fight for the International Brigades during the Spanish Civil War, leaving Britain to join them in November 1936. Once in Spain, he first became a mechanic, then an ambulance driver, and finally a machine gunner. Writing home to his wife, Clem Beckett described his motivations for fighting for the International Brigade:

"I'm sure you'll realise that I should never have been satisfied had I not assisted. Only my hatred of Fascism brought me here."

Beckett died on 12 February 1937, covering the retreat of fellow British volunteers near Arganda Bridge during the Battle of Jarama. He was 1 of 150 members of the British Battalion of the International Brigade to be killed during fighting near the River Jarama valley, south-east of Madrid. During the battle, Beckett and his close friend and fellow communist Christopher Caudwell took control of a Chauchat Light machine gun and set up position on a location which would later become known as "suicide hill". Beckett's machine gun jammed, resulting in his position being overrun by nationalist forces and himself alongside many of his comrades being killed. A close friend of Beckett and reporter for the Daily Worker, George Sinfield, described the events leading to Clem's death:

"Clem and Chris were posted at a vital point. They faced innumerable odds: artillery, planes, and howling Moors throwing hand-grenades. Their section was ordered to retire. Clem and Chris kept their machine-gun trained on the advancing fascists, as a cover to the retreat. The advance was halted, but Clem and Chris... lost their lives."

Beckett's death made the front page of many British newspapers, although many British people were surprised to learn that he had joined the International Brigades. Later during the same year he died, a biography covering his life was published, titled Clem Beckett: Hero and Sportsman. His biker helmet is on display at Gallery Oldham, alongside many other objects relevant to his life. In 2016, a play based on Clem Beckett's life was created by The Townsend Productions, titled ‘Dare Devil Rides To Jarama’ . The play was reviewed positively by one Morning Star reviewer, describing Dare Devil Rides to Jarama as "quite simply the best political theatre produced for a long, long time".

== See also ==
- Charlie Hutchison
- Bill Alexander
- Ralph Winston Fox
- GCT Giles
- Communist Party of Great Britain
