= Joseph Madin =

British trade unionist (1892–1967)

Joseph Madin (July 1892 – 3 February 1967) was a British socialist and trade unionist active in Sheffield who played a major role in founding the Sheffield Labour College. He also played a role as President of Sheffield Trades and Labour Council.

Madin was a shop steward for the Amalgamated Society of Engineers at Hadfields Limited, a large scale Sheffield steel producer active in the armaments industry. He joined the Socialist Labour Party (SLP) in 1914.

J. T. Murphy had become a prominent member of the SLP, active locally but also playing a significant role in the Communist Unity Group which emerged within the SLP the formation of a communist party. the Following the Foundation Congress of the Communist Party of Great Britain at the beginning of August 1920, the three Sheffield groups present decided to form the Sheffield Communist Party as the local branch. However Madin remained with the rump of the local SLP saying:

"The bulk of these ex-members came in during the war period... The stress of the times and the then lack of facility for doing so prevented the inculcation of that knowledge of social science and Socialist principles which constitutes the basis of efficient, enduring and uncompromising efforts on behalf of the revolutionary movement."

Trade union offices
Preceded by J. W. Sterland	President of the Sheffield Trades and Labour Council; 1946–1960	Succeeded by Bill Owen
