= Harry McShane =

Scottish socialist

- Born: 7 May 1891; Glasgow, Scotland
- Died: 12 April 1988 (aged 96); Glasgow, Scotland
- Known for: Socialism and communism
- Political party: Communist Party of Great Britain; Federation of Marxist Groups (after 1955)
- Other political affiliations: British Socialist Party; Clyde Workers' Committee
- Movement: National Unemployed Workers' Movement

Harry McShane (7 May 1891 – 12 April 1988) was a Scottish socialist, and a close colleague of John Maclean.

== Life and career ==
Born into a Roman Catholic family, he became a Marxist. He was involved in the Clyde Workers Committee and the anti-war movement during the First World War. After the conflict ended, he was part of the Tramp Trust Unlimited, formed by Maclean to propagandise and campaign for a minimum wage and a six-hour day, amongst other socialist policies.

He was a member of the British Socialist Party, like Maclean, but chose to join the Communist Party of Great Britain when it was formed in 1920 rather than follow Maclean into the Scottish Workers Republican Party. McShane stated of the SRWP, that they "had some queer people that I didn’t like – they had never been to John’s economics classes, they knew nothing about socialism or revolutionary work. Even if I had not joined the Communist Party I could never have joined with that crowd".

A firm supporter of the Soviet Union, McShane visited Russia in 1932. He was shocked by some of the things he saw there, particularly the working conditions in a coal mine in the Donbas region, which he described as being like something from the previous century. He met a young American journalist who had come to the USSR as a firm supporter, but had become disillusioned, as "people kept disappearing...and no-one asked any questions". McShane remembered later that his faith in the Soviet Union remained strong, but he had his first doubts after the trip.

In the 1930s, he became involved with the National Unemployed Workers' Movement and led a number of hunger marches to London. In 1933, McShane lead an NUWM march from Glasgow to Edinburgh which became known as the Scottish Hunger March. The marchers camped out on the streets of Edinburgh for three days, and McShane chronicled this event in a pamphlet that was published and distributed entitled "Three Days that Shook Edinburgh". In the 1930s, he also fought to ensure that freedom of speech and assembly was allowed on Glasgow Green along with other socialist figures.

McShane had a number of disagreements with the Communist Party, particularly over the policy document The British Road to Socialism which he regarded as "reformist"; ultimately, he would leave the Communist Party but remained a convinced socialist for the remainder of his life. In 1954, he combined with other socialist figures such as Eric Heffer to create a new organisation, the Federation of Marxist Groups. In 1958, after reading Marxism and Freedom by Raya Dunayevskaya, he embraced Marxist Humanism. He was also involved in the Amalgamated Engineering Union and was a Scottish correspondent for the Daily Worker.

While not involved as a full-time organiser, McShane worked as an engineer, and continued to do engineering work until he retired at 69.

His biography, No Mean Fighter was published in 1978. The book is based on transcriptions of tape recordings made at the suggestion of Paul Foot. Richard Kuper and Pluto Press bought the tape recorder that Joan Smith used to make the recordings. She then worked alongside McShane until together they produced the final draft for publication.

He died on 12 April 1988.

== Awards ==
On 21 December 1984, he was awarded the freedom of the City of Glasgow for his services to the Labour and Trade Union movements.
