= Reuben Falber =

British Communist official

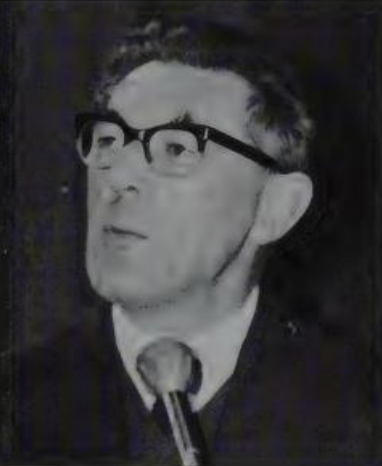
- Reuben Falber in the 1970s
- Born: October 14, 1914
- Died: April 29, 2006 (aged 91)
- Political party: Communist Party of Great Britain

Reuben Falber (14 October 1914 – 29 April 2006) was an official of the Communist Party of Great Britain (CPGB). He joined the Party in 1936 and held the post of Assistant General Secretary from 1968 to 1979. He retired from official party work in 1979 but remained a member until it was dissolved in 1991. After this, he confessed to laundering money from the Communist Party of the Soviet Union into the CPGB.

== Early life ==
Falber was born on 14 October 1914 in London. His parents were Eva and David Falber; they were Polish Jews who ran a hairdressing business. At 14 years old, Falber left school and became an apprentice hairdresser. He did not serve in World War II due to his poor eyesight.

== Career ==
In 1936, at the onset of the Spanish Civil War, Falber joined the Communist Party of Great Britain (CPGB). He became a party official in 1941, beginning as the local branch secretary for Hendon before moving to Sheffield to serve as the district secretary for Yorkshire. He returned to London in 1945, where he worked in the Party's headquarters on King Street. In 1965, he was elected to the executive committee, and from 1968 until 1979 he was the Assistant General Secretary of the party. Falber retired from official party work in 1979.

Falber was a member of the CPGB until it dissolved in 1991. After this, he expressed regret about the Khatyn massacre and his trust in the validity of the Moscow trials. On the naivety of the CPGB, he said, "[W]e had this attitude, everything from the Soviet Union was right, and every criticism that was made of the Soviet Union was regarded as people who had no love for the country, who wanted to undermine support for it in Britain. And therefore we rejected what was true; we wouldn't believe it."

Money laundering

In 1991, responding to accusations from The Sunday Times, Falber wrote an article for Changes in which he confessed to having "received substantial sums of money from the CPSU via employees of the Soviet embassy" from 1956 until the late 1970s. For a period, the money was handed to Falber at Barons Court tube station, hidden in shopping bags. By the 1960s, Falber had reportedly laundered £100,000.

Falber defended his actions by claiming that the received funds were vital to the CPGB because it lost significant financial support after the 1956 invasion of Hungary. Doubts have been raised about the veracity of Falber's claims.

== Personal life and death ==
Falber was Jewish and an anti-Zionist. He became an atheist after joining the CPGB in 1936, though he soon abandoned this. Falber married Helen Goldman in the early 1940s. They lived in Golders Green and had no children.

Falber died on 29 April 2006.

Party political offices
Preceded by Bill Alexander	Assistant General Secretary of the Communist Party of Great Britain; 1968–1979	Succeeded by Position abolished?
