= Appeal Group =

1970s British group of Marxist-Leninists

The Appeal Group was a small group of Marxist–Leninists who broke away from the Communist Party of Great Britain (CPGB) in 1971 on the basis that the CPGB had abandoned revolutionary Marxism–Leninism and that, after many attempts, it was impossible to change it from within except by breaking the rules. The group lasted for about five or six years. All its publications were lodged with the British Library.

== Problems with the CPGB ==
The roots of the Appeal Group went back to the early 1950s, when the Bexley branch of the CPGB, led by Eddie Jackson, challenged the introduction of the British Road to Socialism and Rule 2(b) in the party’s rule book. The British Road replaced the former party programme, For a Soviet Britain, and was a programme for achieving socialism in Britain through the election of a socialist government to Parliament without a revolution. Rule 2(b) set this aim as a rule and outlawed any promotion of other perspectives by party members.

Some older CPGB members who opposed these revisionist changes found themselves in a minority and isolated. The party’s strict democratic centralism forbade them to communicate their concerns about the direction the party was taking except through the district and central congresses. The Bexley branch in particular submitted amendments on Rule 2(b) to these bodies, without success. On occasions the venue of the Kent district congress was changed and the district secretary “forgot” to inform the Bexley comrades, and names of nominated comrades were “accidentally” left off ballot papers. The leadership thus suppressed critical discussion of its policies, with the notable exception of executive committee member Brian Behan, who argued for Bexley’s views to be heard and discussed. In 20 years the branch was only ever allowed five minutes of open discussion time at a Party congress, and this was scheduled on a Saturday just after the lunch break when the hall was almost deserted as delegates lingered in the pub.

== Appeal and split ==
Eddie Jackson despaired of changing the party from within. In 1971, the Bexley branch submitted its usual amendment to Rule 2(b), but this time Jackson and a small group of comrades backed it up with a lengthy polemical document, the "Appeal to Delegates" after which the later Appeal Group was named, and distributed it to delegates at the congress.

After being expelled from the party, the members of the Appeal Group aimed to recruit supporters from inside and outside the CPGB to fight on an anti-revisionist platform. They met up to four times a week in a council flat overlooking Charlton Athletic football ground for several years. In its first years the group grew a little, but there were never more than about 30 members at any one time, though well over 100 people, from all around the country, had some brief association with it. Some of these later went on to be involved with the New Communist Party and other break-aways from the CPGB.

== Actions ==
Meetings were dominated by deep theoretical discussions, focused at first on Lenin’s "One Step Forward, Two Steps Back" and the dialectics of political processes. These discussions were led primarily by Eddie Jackson. Jackson was a self-taught engineer with a deep distrust of middle-class intellectuals, whom he blamed for the revisionism of the old party. The group issued a number of pamphlets and a monthly paper, The Appeal, which ran up to five issues.

The discovery of revisionism within English-language publications from the Soviet Union had a demoralising effect on the group. Jackson’s increasing paranoia about infiltration and his distrust of newcomers also drove away many potential supporters, and the group dwindled and faded away.
