= Vic Allen =

British communist, professor and anti-apartheid activist

- Born: Victor Leonard Allen; 12 January 1923; Flintshire, Wales
- Died: 26 October 2014 (aged 91)
- Education: London School of Economics (PhD)
- Occupations: Teacher; Author; University Professor
- Employer: University of Leeds
- Known for: Anti-apartheid activism Communist activism Smuggling money to fund South African trade unions
- Notable work: Power in Trade Unions (1954)
- Political party: Communist Party of Great Britain (CPGB)
- Criminal charges: Conspiracy to overthrow the government of Nigeria
- Criminal penalty: 6 months prison (Made an Amnesty prisoner of conscience and released after six months)
- Children: 2 sons 3 daughters
- Awards: Kgao ya Bahale award (2010)

Vic Allen (12 January 1923 – 26 October 2014) was a British communist, human rights activist, political prisoner, sociologist, historian, economist and emeritus professor at the University of Leeds who worked closely with British trade unions, and was considered a key player in the resistance against Apartheid in South Africa. He was also known for being a key activist within the Communist Party of Great Britain (CPGB), and for spending his life supporting the South African National Union of Mineworkers (NUM).

Allen was the mentor of British trade union leader Arthur Scargill, and also a brief acquaintance of Nelson Mandela. During attempts to establish trade unions in Nigeria, he was accused of conspiring to overthrow the Nigerian government and spent 6 months in jail. He was also involved in a successful mission to smuggle £100,000 into Apartheid South Africa to fund trade unions, and in 1988 was present at secret talks in Cuba between Fidel Castro and black South African union leaders.

In 2010, Allen was awarded the Kgao ya Bahale award, the highest honour awarded by the South African NUM. After his death he was widely commendated by his fellow academics and activists for his lifelong commitment to worker's rights and racial equality.

Vic Allen was the brother of Dr. Anthony Brian Allen (May 6, 1931 – April 2, 2015), who was the husband of Princess Nadezhda Romanova, great granddaughter of Russian Emperor Alexander III.

== Early life ==
Son of Jane (née Fletcher) and Samuel Leonard (Len) Allen, Victor Leonard Allen was born in Shotton, Flintshire and raised in Connah's Quay, Flintshire. Vic Allen left school at fourteen with no qualifications and became an apprentice bricklayer. During his time as a bricklayer, he was lent books by a fellow construction worker which inspired him to pursue an education at the London School of Economics where he was taught by Harold Laski. He worked as a bricklayer before and after service in the RAF during World War II. During this time, he became an accomplished amateur boxer competing at a national level. Allen originally took up boxing in response to being bullied at school. While working as a bricklayer, he began to be educated in Marxism and socialism by fellow workers. He became more politicised after being sacked from a site for joining a trade union.

== Political activities ==
While working for the International Labour Organization in Geneva, Vic Allen was sent to Nigeria to study trade union organisations in Sub-Saharan Africa. During his time in Nigeria he attempted to help activists establish trade unions in the country, only for Allen to be arrested and charged with conspiring to overthrow the Nigerian government. After 6 months in prison, he was released after being made an "Amnesty prisoner of conscience".

Allen was the official historian of the British National Union of Mineworkers (NUM), a confidant of Arthur Scargill, Ken Gill and Mick McGahey and an adviser to British trade unionists for over 40 years. He also aided trade unionists and campaigners in the fight against apartheid in South Africa from the 1960s onwards and, after the fall of the regime, wrote a three-volume history of mineworkers in South Africa on behalf of the South African National Union of Mineworkers (NUM). He was a member of the national committee of the Campaign for Nuclear Disarmament (CND) for many years, and in 1985 he came last in a ballot to choose the chair of the organisation running on a pro-Soviet, unilateral disarmament ticket.

In support of NUM, Allen was involved in a mission to smuggle £100,000 into South Africa to fund trade unions in the country.

Through his connections with NUM, in 1988 Allen was present in Cuba at secret talks between union activists and Fidel Castro. Also present at the talks were leading anti-apartheid activists Cyril Ramaphosa and James Motlatsi.

In the early 1990s a close friend of Allen, Ramaphosa (who went on to become President of South Africa in 2018), took him on a trip to Johannesburg airport. To Allen's surprise, Nelson Mandela was present in the back seat of their car. Mandela and Allen shared a long car ride discussion of world politics and the two activists bonded over their shared love of boxing.

From the mid-1980s to the mid-1990s, Allen was a member of the management committee that owns the Morning Star.

He was revealed in September 1999 to have been an "agent of influence" for the East German Stasi secret police, from material contained in the Mitrokhin Archive, possessing the code name "Barber". Allen admitted "pass[ing] on information about CND's activities ... [but] considered that perfectly legitimate because he belonged to a pro-Soviet, pro-East German faction of the group." Allen defended his actions citing that none of the information he had discussed was secret.

== Honours and awards ==
In 2010, Allen was awarded the Kgao ya Bahale award, the highest honour awarded by the South African NUM. The award ceremony was held by a delegation of NUM leaders, including then President Senzeni Zokwana, General Secretary Frans Baleni, former President James Motlatsi and former General Secretary Cyril Ramaphosa. Also present at the awards ceremony were many South African activists who praised Allen as a 'true internationalist'.

== Academic career ==
Allen went up to the London School of Economics in 1946 and gained a BSc in Economics in 1949 followed by a PhD. His PhD thesis was published in 1954 as "Power in Trade Unions".

Allen was appointed a Lecturer in Industrial Relations in the School of Economic Studies at the University of Leeds in 1959, becoming a Senior Lecturer in 1963, Reader in 1970 and Professor of the Sociology of Industrial Society in 1973. He retired from Leeds in 1988 with the title emeritus professor.

Allen wrote and published three volumes of the history of the National Union of Miners (NUM) in South Africa, described by academics as "one of the strongest and most insightful produced to date". These three volumes took Allen 10 years to create.

== Death and legacy ==
Allen died on 26 October 2014, aged 91. His funeral was held at a rural inn called the Craven Heifer, close to Skipton in the Yorkshire Dales. Vic Allen was married three times during his life, and fathered five children: Jane, Nick and Julian with his first wife Margaret, and Sophie and Lucy with his second wife Sheila Allen. His third wife was Kate Carey. He had 8 grandchildren and 9 great-grandchildren by the time he died.

After Allen's death, Frans Baleni created a tribute dedicated to Allen. A delegation of the NUM was present at Allen's funeral.

Baleni said of Allen:

"Back then black South African mineworkers had no names. We had company numbers. We were just a tool. Vic made it possible for us to train in the UK. We were taken to Trafalgar Square where anti-apartheid activists were camping day and night. That made me fully understand the meaning of empathy. Vic taught us to make sure we appreciated each other, never to leave anything to chance."

Arthur Scargill, whom Allen had mentored before Scargill became the president of the NUM, described Allen as "an intellectual giant, a writer without peer."

== Books ==
- Power in Trade Unions, Longmans, 1954
- Militant Trade Unionism - a re-analysis of industrial action in an inflationary situation, Merlin, 1966. ISBN 978-0850361254
- The Sociology of Industrial Relations, Longmans, 1971. ISBN 978-0-582-44482-9
- Social Analysis: A Marxist Critique and Alternative. Longmans, 1975
- The Militancy of British Miners, Moor Press, 1981. ISBN 090769800X
- The Russians are Coming: The Politics of Anti-Sovietism, Moor Press, 1987.
- The History of Black Mineworkers in South Africa Volume 1, Moor Press, 1992. ISBN 0850365651
- Apartheid Repression and Dissent in the Mines. The History of Black Mineworkers in South Africa, 1948-1982, Merlin Press and Moor Press, 2003. ISBN 085036566X
- Organise or Die. The History of Black Mineworkers in South Africa, 1982-1994, Merlin Press and Moor Press, 2005. ISBN 0850365678

== See also ==
- Communist Party of Great Britain
- Thora Silverthorne
- GCT Giles
