= Attack at Periah Pass =

- Part of Cotiote War
Date	18 March 1797
Location	Periah Pass, Wayanad, Kerala, India
Result	Cotiote victory

Belligerents
Kingdom of Kottayam	East India Company

Commanders and leaders
Pazhassi Raja	Maj. Cameron †; Lt. Nugent †; Lt. Madge †; Lt. Rudderman †

Strength
Unknown	~1,100 soldiers

Casualties and losses
Unknown	Heavy; several officers killed, guns and baggage captured

The Attack at Periah Pass was a military engagement on 18 March 1797 during the Cotiote War, in which forces of the Kingdom of Kottayam under Pazhassi Raja ambushed and defeated a column of the East India Company at Periah Pass in Wayanad, Kerala. The action resulted in heavy casualties for the Company, including the deaths of several officers, and the capture of baggage and artillery by the rebels.
