= William Paul (British politician) =

British communist newspaper editor and politician (1884–1958)

- Born: 11 August 1884; Glasgow, Scotland
- Died: 9 March 1958 (aged 73)
- Known for: Editor of the Sunday Worker
- Notable work: The State: Its Origin and Functions (1917)

William Paul (11 August 1884 – 9 March 1958), commonly known as Willie Paul, was a British communist newspaper editor and political candidate.

Born in Glasgow, Paul was an ardent socialist at a young age. He joined the Socialist Labour Party (SLP) soon after it was founded. In 1911 he relocated to Derby where he ran a market stall selling hosiery and drapery. By regularly moving his stall from city to city, he was able to link SLP members across northern England and the Midlands, and surreptitiously distribute radical literature.

Paul fully endorsed the SLP's opposition to World War I, and he supported Derby anti-war activist Alice Wheeldon. In 1917, he authored The State: Its Origin and Functions, in which he developed the Marxist theory of the state. It was the first of many pamphlets he wrote. He became the SLP's national organiser and co-editor of the Party newspaper, The Socialist. He stood for the SLP in the 1918 general election in Ince, taking 13% of the votes cast.

Within the SLP, Paul's advocacy for communist unity was rejected by the Party majority. In response, he organised the Communist Unity Group, which then joined the newly formed Communist Party of Great Britain (CPGB). At the Foundation Congress of the CPGB in 1920, Paul put the case against affiliating to the Labour Party. Although the CPGB members voted by a narrow margin to apply for affiliation, the Labour Party declined the offer on the grounds of incompatible political goals.

In 1921, Paul became editor of the CPGB's theoretical journal, Communist Review. He stood unsuccessfully for Parliament in Manchester Rusholme in the 1923 general election as the Labour candidate, and in the 1924 general election as the Communist candidate.

From 1925 to 1927, Paul was editor of the CPGB's Sunday Worker newspaper; it was launched at the time of the National Left-Wing Movement. At its height, the paper claimed a circulation approaching 100,000. However, it was a fraught period for Paul in which he himself was sometimes part of the news story as in May 1927 when he pleaded guilty to libeling the London Metropolitan Police.

In the ensuing decades, Paul largely withdrew from politics, newspaper editing, and the public eye. He did remain active in the local peace and Anglo-Soviet friendship movements, and he wrote a CPGB-published pamphlet in 1946 on the new challenges posed by atomic energy.

On 9 March 1958, William Paul died at his home in the Derby suburb of Allestree. He was 73.

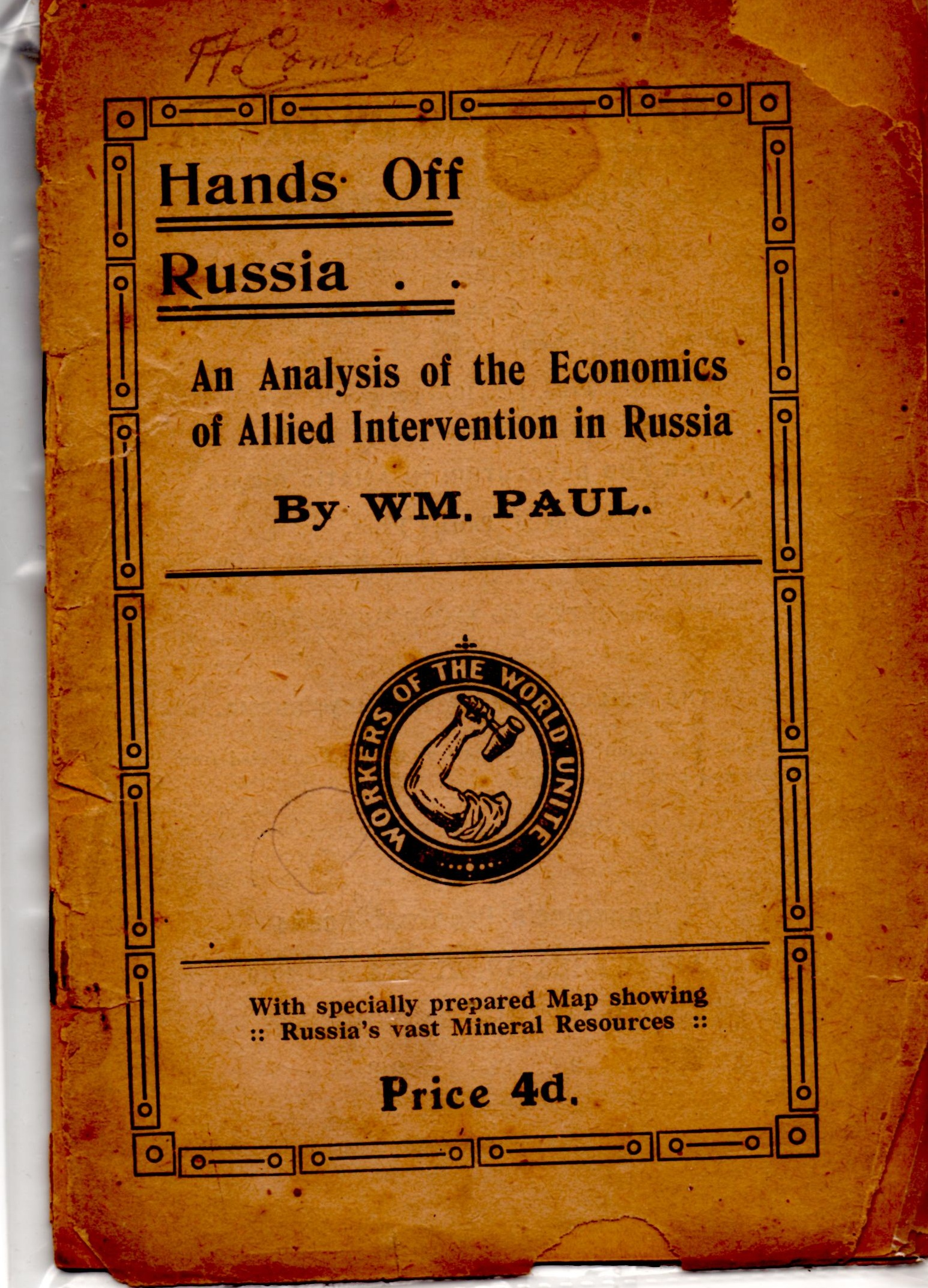
Hands Off Russia pamphlet, 1919

== Selected works ==
- The State: Its Origin and Function, 1917. Reprinted in 1974 by the Communist Organisation in the British Isles. OCLC 1179510185. ISBN 0950397202.
- Labour and Empire: A Study in Imperialism, 1917. OCLC 41424270.
- Scientific Socialism: Its Revolutionary Aims and Methods, 1918. OCLC 1059400.
- Hands Off Russia: An Analysis of the Economics of Allied Intervention in Russia, 1919. OCLC 220709134.
- The Irish Crisis: The British Communist Stand on Self-Determination, 1921. Reprinted in 1986 by the Cork Workers' Club. OCLC 53920808.
- Communism and Society, 1922. OCLC 5803714.
- The Path to Power: The Communist Party on Trial, 1925. OCLC 502495049.
- Atomic Energy and Social Progress, 1946. OCLC 31495382.

Media offices
Preceded by New position	Editor of the Sunday Worker; 1925 – 1927	Succeeded by Walter Holmes
