= Ark Acton Academy =

Location
- Gunnersbury Lane; Acton; London, W3 8EY; England; 51.5059°N 0.2805°W

Information
- Type: Academy
- Established: 1906
- Local authority: Ealing
- Department for Education URN: 146318 Tables
- Ofsted: Reports
- Principal: Jinan Ibrahim
- Gender: Coeducational
- Enrolment: 1013
- Sixth form students: 100
- Houses: Brown; Thunberg; Edward; Rashford
- Test average: 0.32 (Progress 8 score) 43.6 (Attainment 8 score)
- Website: arkacton.org

Ark Acton Academy, is a coeducational secondary school and sixth form located in the Acton area of the London Borough of Ealing, England.

The school teaches pupils between the ages of 11 and 18. It is sited on Gunnersbury Lane (A4000).

== History ==
=== Grammar school ===
The school was originally known as Acton County Grammar School, which opened in 1906 for 200 boys (at a different site). It was the first purpose-built county grammar school in Middlesex. From 1926 to 1956, the school's headmaster was GCT Giles, an Old Etonian and communist activist who was President of the National Union of Teachers (NUT) when the Education Act 1944 was introduced. In 1958, the school began admitting girls, becoming fully co-educational in 1966. The year before, in 1965, the school's administration moved from Middlesex County Council to the London Borough of Ealing. When proposals for going comprehensive appeared in 1966, parents took the LEA to court and lost.

=== Comprehensive ===
The school became a comprehensive in 1967, when Ealing borough adopted the three tier system, and was known as Acton County Comprehensive. In 1974 it became Reynolds High School, named after local politician and former pupil Gerry Reynolds who has been a Minister in the 1960s and had been tipped for higher office.

In the 1970s, the neighbouring Ealing Mead County school off Popes Lane, opened in 1962, was found to have serious structural problems in its building. After only twelve years of use, Ealing Mead had to be closed and demolished. As a result, the pupils of the school were distributed around the other local schools and Reynolds High School absorbed a significant proportion of them. Reynolds High School closed in July 1984 primarily due to falling school roll but re-opened in September the same year as Acton High School following a merger with Faraday High School, formerly based at Bromyard Avenue. Faraday High School appeared on the 1977 BBC Panorama Documentary, which eventually led to Faraday being shut down. The old brick buildings, dating from 1939, were demolished in 2005, and a new school building built on the same site.

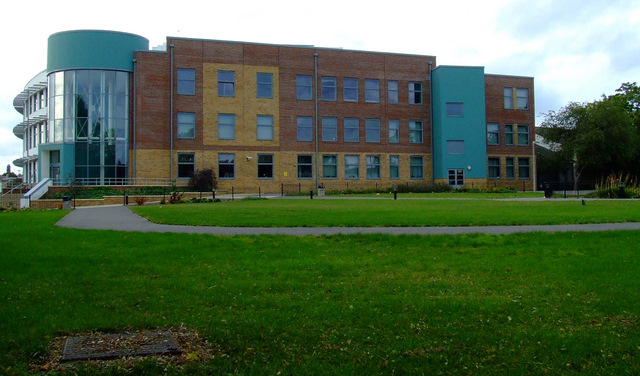
The front of the main building

=== Academy ===
Previously a community school administered by Ealing London Borough Council, in September 2018 Acton High School converted to academy status and was renamed Ark Acton Academy. The school is now sponsored by Ark Schools.

=== Sixth form ===
Originally established in 2012 and re-opened in 2018 under Ark Schools, the sixth form is a part of the school. It is currently led by Patricia Smith and has a cohort of at least 100 students.

Due to funding and budget constraints, the sixth form is set to close in September 2026.

==== Sixth form curriculum ====
The sixth form offers subjects at A-level and BTEC. The subjects available include:

- English Literature
- Mathematics
- Further Mathematics
- Biology
- Physics
- Chemistry
- Psychology
- Sociology
- Geography
- History
- Government and Politics
- Economics
- BTEC Nationals Applied Science
- BTEC Nationals Business Studies

== Notable former pupils ==
=== Acton County Grammar School ===
- Sir Austin Bide, chemist and industrialist
- Anthony Valentine, actor
- Pete Townshend, musician, founder member of The Who
- Roger Daltrey CBE, musician, founder member of The Who
- John Entwistle, musician, founder member of The Who
- John "Speedy" Keen, musician for Thunderclap Newman, who wrote the 1960s song Something in the Air and a song for The Who, Armenia City in the Sky
- Colin Phipps, petroleum geologist and Labour MP from 1974 to 1979 for Dudley West
- Leonard E. H. Williams CBE DFC, Chief Executive from 1967 to 1981 of the Nationwide Building Society
- Ian Gillan, musician, lead singer of Deep Purple

=== Reynolds High School ===
- Warren Neill, professional footballer with QPR and Portsmouth FC

=== Acton High School ===
- Paul Bruce, Professional footballer (1996–2008)
- Gemma Cairney, BBC Radio 1Xtra DJ and fashion stylist
- Jamal Edwards CBE, entrepreneur/founder of SBTV (1990–2022)
- Caroline O'Connor, Olympic rowing coxswain
- Emily Winterburn, Writer

== Notable staff ==
- Zacron, born Richard Drew (1943–2012) was an English artist who designed the Led Zeppelin III album cover. Head of Art Teacher during the mid 70s
- GCT Giles, Headmaster, president of the NUT, leading communist
