= Bill Alexander (British politician) =

British communist activist (1910–2000)

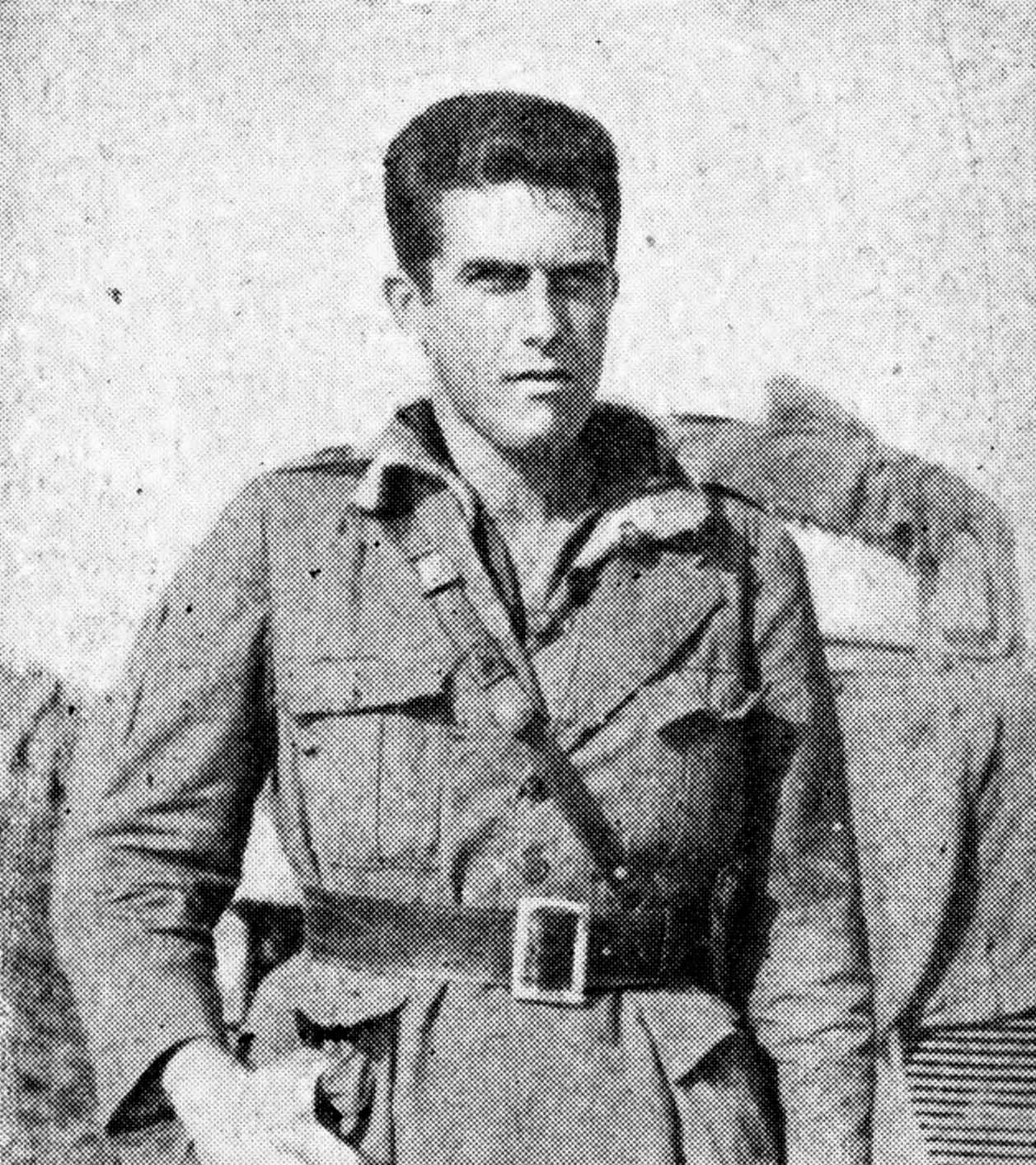
- Alexander in Spain c. 1937
- Born: William Alexander; 13 June 1910; Ringwood, Hampshire, England
- Died: 11 July 2000 (aged 90)
- Education: University of Reading; Royal Military Academy Sandhurst
- Spouse: Lena
- Children: 2
- Military career
- Allegiance: Spanish Republic; United Kingdom
- Branch: International Brigades; British Army
- Rank: Battalion Commander; Captain
- Units: The "Abraham Lincoln" XV International Brigade; Reconnaissance Corps
- Commands: 15th Anti-Tank Battery; British Battalion
- Conflicts: Battle of Cable Street; Spanish Civil War; Battle of Brunete; Battle of Belchite; Battle of Teruel; World War II
- Awards: Cited for bravery (1937); Awarded with Spanish citizenship for his support of the Spanish republicans (1996)

William Alexander (13 June 1910 – 11 July 2000) was a leading activist within the Communist Party of Great Britain (CPGB). He was best known for commanding the British Battalion of the International Brigades during the Spanish Civil War. During World War II he served in the British Army, with deployments in Northern Africa, Italy, and Germany. He was promoted to the rank of captain in the Reconnaissance Corps. After the war he became an author, the vice-chairman of the International Brigade Association, and the president of London's Marx Memorial Library. He spent the remainder of his life promoting Marxism–Leninism, and was a member of the CPGB until the Party was dissolved in 1991.

== Early life ==
The son of a carpenter, Bill Alexander was born into a large working-class family in the rural English town of Ringwood, Hampshire. Influenced by his mother's political beliefs and by the British National Hunger March 1932, he joined the CPGB in 1932. He studied chemistry at the University of Reading and became an industrial chemist, although much of his time was spent working with trade unions and promoting communism through the CPGB. He was a prominent anti-fascist and was present at the Battle of Cable Street.

== Spanish Civil War ==
In spring of 1937, Alexander volunteered to join the British Battalion of the International Brigades to aid the Republican side in the Spanish Civil War. Arriving in Spain, he first saw combat during the Battle of Brunete. After a fortnight of fighting, his battalion went from a strength of 300 to 42, with Alexander one of the survivors.

He joined the 15th Brigade's Anti-Tank Battery, an elite unit armed with high-calibre Soviet anti-tank weaponry, and was named the unit's political commissar. He received a citation for bravery at the Battle of Belchite in September 1937. Alexander rose to the rank of commander of the British Battalion and led his troops at the Battle of Teruel. During this battle, he sustained serious bullet wounds to his chest and shoulder. Due to these injuries, he left Spain in June 1938.

== World War II ==
After his return to Britain from Spain, Alexander was made the CPGB's Merseyside Area secretary. He attempted to join the Royal Military Academy Sandhurst early in World War II, but was initially refused on account of his CPGB membership. However, his case was taken up by the Duchess of Atholl and he was eventually permitted to enroll. In 1940 he accepted the commissioning course at Sandhurst, where he graduated the top cadet of his year. During WWII, Alexander served the Allied forces in Africa and Europe. Despite communists such as himself suffering discrimination within the British military, he achieved the rank of captain in the Reconnaissance Corps. After leaving the British Army, Alexander resumed working as a full-time activist for the CPGB.

== Post-WWII and later life ==
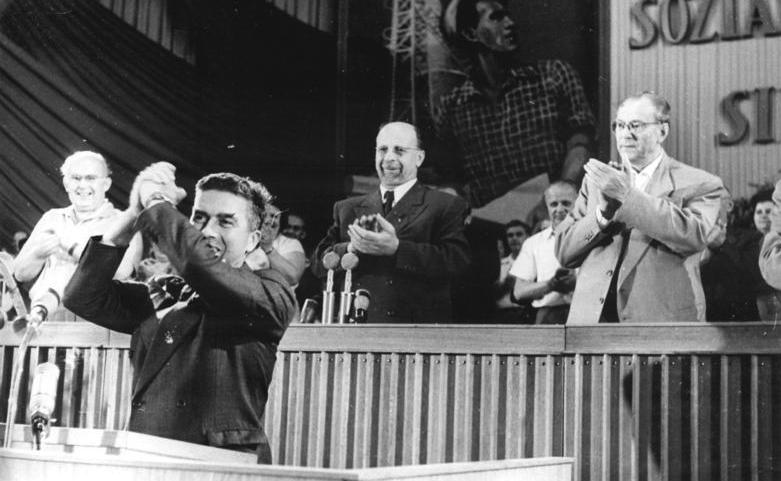
Alexander receiving applause at the Fifth Congress of the Socialist Unity Party of Germany, East Berlin in July 1958, while representing the CPGB.

Alexander stood in Coventry East for the 1945 and 1951 general elections, but lost his deposit on both occasions. He was Midlands Area Secretary of the CPGB from 1947 to 1953, then Welsh Area Secretary until 1959, when he was made Assistant General Secretary of the Party. In 1965 Alexander was part of a delegation of the CPGB which travelled to North Vietnam alongside General Secretary John Gollan and John Mahon. In 1967 he resigned his CPGB post, and became a chemistry teacher at Sydenham School. However, he remained a member of the CPGB until its dissolution in 1991. In the 1980s he was a vocal opponent of what he regarded as a revisionist trend within the Party. In his last decade, he spoke in favour of environmental causes.

Alexander served as president of the Marx Memorial Library from 1989 until 1996. He ran the International Brigade Association, and wrote extensively on the Spanish Civil War, publishing British Volunteers For Liberty, No To Franco, and contributing to Memorials Of The Spanish Civil War. In 1996 he led a delegation of veterans back to Spain to visit old battlegrounds.

Bill Alexander died on 11 July 2000, at age 90.

== Works ==
- British Volunteers For Liberty. Lawrence and Wishart, UK, 1982
- George Orwell and Spain. Lawrence and Wishart, UK, 1984
- No To Franco: The Struggle Never Stopped 1939-1975. B. Alexander, 1992
- Memorials Of The Spanish Civil War. Sutton, UK, 1996

== See also ==
- Thora Silverthorne
- GCT Giles
- Charlie Hutchison
- Ralph Winston Fox

Party political offices
Preceded by Alun Thomas	Secretary of the Welsh District of the Communist Party of Great Britain; 1953–1959	Succeeded by Bert Pearce
Preceded by Bill Wainwright	Assistant General Secretary of the Communist Party of Great Britain; 1959–1967	Succeeded by Reuben Falber
