= Communist Unity Group =

Early communist group which joined the CPGB in 1920

The Communist Unity Group (CUG) was a small communist organisation in the United Kingdom.

The origins of the group lay in the Socialist Labour Party (SLP). The SLP was a De Leonist group, but in support of the October Revolution, it decided to participate in unity negotiations with the other British communist groups – principally the British Socialist Party (BSP) and the Workers Socialist Federation (WSF). To this end, it formed a Unity Committee in January 1919. This committee included many prominent members of the SLP: Tom Bell, Arthur McManus, J. T. Murphy and William Paul, all of them proponents of a united communist party.

The main difficulty in the negotiations was the BSP – the largest group – were affiliated to the Labour Party and wished any new communist party to be so, or at least that former BSP members could maintain their individual affiliations, a position vehemently opposed by the SLP and WSF. As discussions broke down, the Unity Committee proposed that the issue could be avoided by holding a vote on Labour Party affiliation one year after the formation of a communist party, reasoning that once the party was formed, BSP members would conclude they did not need to remain part of Labour. Not only was this proposal unsuccessful, but the SLP executive publicly repudiated and dissolved the Unity Committee, and decided against further unity negotiations.

The main figures of the Unity Committee – with the exception of Murphy – continued to attend the unity negotiations unofficially, and in April 1920 they organised a separate conference alongside the SLP conference. This event was not well attended, but the Committee had now moved in opposition to the SLP and directed the conference to constitute itself as the Communist Unity Group. The CUG adopted a policy of negotiated unity with parliamentary agitation but opposition to the Labour Party. A small number of SLP branches joined the CUG, but the group drew fewer members than they had hoped. However, around two thirds of its members were from the SLP.

The group attended the Foundation Congress which formed the Communist Party of Great Britain on 1 August 1920. Although the convention approved Labour Party affiliation by 100 votes to 85, the CUG joined the CPGB, initially becoming its second largest component.

== See also ==
Centrist Marxism
