= John Tocher =

British trade unionist (1925–1991)

John Tocher (29 September 1925 – 17 September 1991) was a British trade unionist and communist activist.

Tocher worked in factories from the age of fourteen, but hoped to work on aeroplanes. When he reached eighteen, he was accepted into the Army Air Corps, serving until the end of World War II, when he returned to complete an apprenticeship at Avro. He joined the Amalgamated Engineering Union (AEU), becoming a shop steward and then workplace convener at Woodford. He joined the Communist Party in 1948.

In 1957, Tocher was elected as the AEU's Stockport District President, and became a delegate to the union's national committee. He became its Stockport District Secretary in 1964, then a full-time assistant divisional organiser, and eventually a divisional organiser. He also joined the Communist Party of Great Britain (CPGB), serving on its executive from 1963.

Tocher led a strike at Roberts Arundel in 1967 and 1968, against efforts to replace experienced workers with women, who the managers expected would work for lower pay and in worse conditions. While the strike was largely unsuccessful (Tocher maintained, however, that the strike was successful), Tocher was lauded for his leadership and was elected Chair of the CPGB's Executive Committee. The events of the strike were detailed in Jim Arnison's book, The Million Pound Strike (1970).

Tocher remained a prominent union figure, leading industrial action in 1972 in support of a 35-hour work week. He stood down from the CPGB Executive Committee in 1973, but still faced harassment resulting from negative articles about him in the press. As a married man with young children, he opted to resign from the CPGB, although he stayed sympathetic to its principles. He continued to be an active trade unionist, and stood unsuccessfully for president of the AEU in 1985.

Tocher was due to retire in late September 1991, but he died a week beforehand.
