= Madge (surname) =

Madge is a surname. Notable people with the surname include:

- Charles Madge (1912–1996), English poet and journalist
- Edward Henry Madge (1901–1970), British malacologist
- Geoffrey Douglas Madge (born 1941), Australian pianist and composer
- John Madge, English sociologist, brother of Charles Madge
- Robert Madge (businessman), entrepreneur and technologist
- Robert Madge (actor), English actor
- Ronald B. Madge (active 1965–2002), Canadian entomologist who worked at the Natural History Museum, London and specialized in the taxonomy of Coleoptera (beetles)
- Steve Madge, birder, author, and bird tour leader
