= Austin Bide =

British chemist and industrialist

Sir Austin Bide
- Born: Austin Ernest Bide; 11 September 1915; Kensington, London, England
- Died: 11 May 2008 (aged 92); North Cheam, England
- Education: Acton County Grammar School
- Alma mater: Birkbeck College and Chelsea Polytechnic
- Occupations: Chemist and Industrialist
- Employers: Laboratory of the Government Chemist; Glaxo Laboratories; BL
- Known for: Reorganising Glaxo
- Spouse: Irene Ward
- Children: 3

Sir Austin Ernest Bide (11 September 1915 – 11 May 2008) was a British chemist and industrialist.

== Biography ==
Bide was born in Kensington, London, on 11 September 1915, to parents Ernest Arthur Bide and Eliza Young. He was brought up by his mother after his father, a gardener who had become a lance bombardier in the Royal Garrison Artillery, was killed in France in October 1918.

After attending Acton County Grammar School, Bide joined the Laboratory of the Government Chemist at age 16, while also studying in the evenings for a chemistry degree. He graduated with first-class honours in 1939. In 1940, he joined Glaxo Laboratories and, as part of the war effort, worked on the synthesis of vitamin B1 and the development of penicillin. In 1944, he was appointed as department head, with responsibility for patents and chemical development, thus beginning his career in management.

In 1951, he was entrusted with supervising the construction of a new factory at Montrose, Angus. Three years later, he was back in London, first as deputy company secretary, then company secretary in 1959, and a director in 1963. He became deputy chairman in 1971.

Bide was heavily involved when Beecham launched the biggest ever takeover bid for Glaxo. It was blocked by the Monopolies Commission in 1972 on the grounds that it would damage the UK's research into new drugs. Bide became chairman and chief executive of Glaxo in 1973, and immediately put in place a process of structural reform by rationalising Glaxo's technical divisions. He retired in 1985 and, controversially, was named life president. Bide had been knighted in 1980. 1987, he was elected an honorary fellow of St Catherine's College, Oxford.

He then started a second career by becoming deputy chairman of BL, a large and largely failing car manufacturer. He was appointed by Sir Michael Edwardes, by whom he was greatly valued. Even so, he failed to get the whole or parts of the company sold.

=== Family ===
Bide married Irene Ward, a milliner, on 28 June 1941. They had three daughters: Ann (1946), Susan (1951) and Patricia (1958).

On 11 May 2008, Austin Bide died of bronchopneumonia following a stroke, in St Anthony's Hospital, North Cheam. His wife died on 13 November 2013, aged 93.
