= Lou Lewis =

English trade unionist and activist

Lou Lewis (27 July 1939 – 11 January 2010) was a trade unionist and activist in London.

== Biography ==
Lou Lewis was born in Liverpool on 27 July 1939 and joined the Amalgamated Society of Woodworkers (ASW) at the start of his carpentry apprenticeship.

He was the union convener at the Barbican site in central London, where he led several so-called wildcat disputes and a lengthy strike in 1967, which called for better working conditions and pay for building workers. He was organiser of the London Joint Sites Committee which brought together building workers across London.

Lewis was a founding member of the Building Workers’ Charter movement which was active in opposing the Lump Labour Scheme.

Later, the Amalgamated Society of Woodworkers (ASW) joined the AUBTW to form the Amalgamated Society of Woodworkers, Painters and Builders (ASWPB), and in December 1971, the name was changed to the Union of Construction, Allied Trades and Technicians (UCATT). Lewis became UCATT Regional Secretary for the London South East Region, and he was a key member of the Communist Party's Executive Committee (from the 1970s onwards).

He died on 11 January 2010, at the age of 71.
