= Fred Peet =

Frederick Harold Peet (born 1890) was a British communist activist.

== Biography ==
Born in Bethnal Green, Peet became active in the British Socialist Party (BSP), and by the late 1910s was its London District Secretary and a member of its National Organising Committee. A member of the majority in the BSP which opposed World War I, he was sentenced to hard labour in Carmarthenshire, his wife and young child having to relocate nearby in order to be able to see him.

Peet supported the October Revolution, and was a committee member and London secretary of the Hands Off Russia campaign. The BSP became the main constituent of the Communist Party of Great Britain (CPGB), and Peet also served as its London District Secretary, combining this with the role of assistant general secretary, and membership of its executive committee. The General Secretary, Albert Inkpin, was arrested in May 1921 and imprisoned until June 1922, and Peet served as Acting General Secretary until August. During this period, the party was rapidly losing members and struggling financially. The Comintern asked the party to put together a commission to urgently review its position; this consisted of Rajani Palme Dutt, Harry Pollitt, and Harry Inkpin, Albert's brother. Their report, released late in 1922, was highly critical of Peet for overstating the party's membership. Major reorganisation of the party led to many former BSP members losing their full-time posts, and this included Peet, who became a commercial traveller.

Fred Peet has sometimes been confused with George Peet, secretary of the National Shop Stewards' and Workers' Committee Movement and another founder member of the CPGB.
