= Jeffrey Andrews =

Jeffrey, Jeffery or Jeff Andrews may refer to:

- Jeff Andrews (born 1959), American baseball player and coach
- Jeff Michael Andrews (1960–2019), American jazz musician
- Jeff Andrews, character played by Scott Brady in I Was a Shoplifter
- Jeffrey Andrews, character played by Chester Morris in Blind Spot
- Jeffrey Andrews (social worker) (born 1986), a Hong Kong social worker and activist

Geoffrey Andrews may refer to:

- Geoffrey Andrews (actor) in Once Upon a Crime
- Geoff Andrews (thrash metal musician), musician with Exodus
