= Camden Town Hall =

Municipal building in London, England

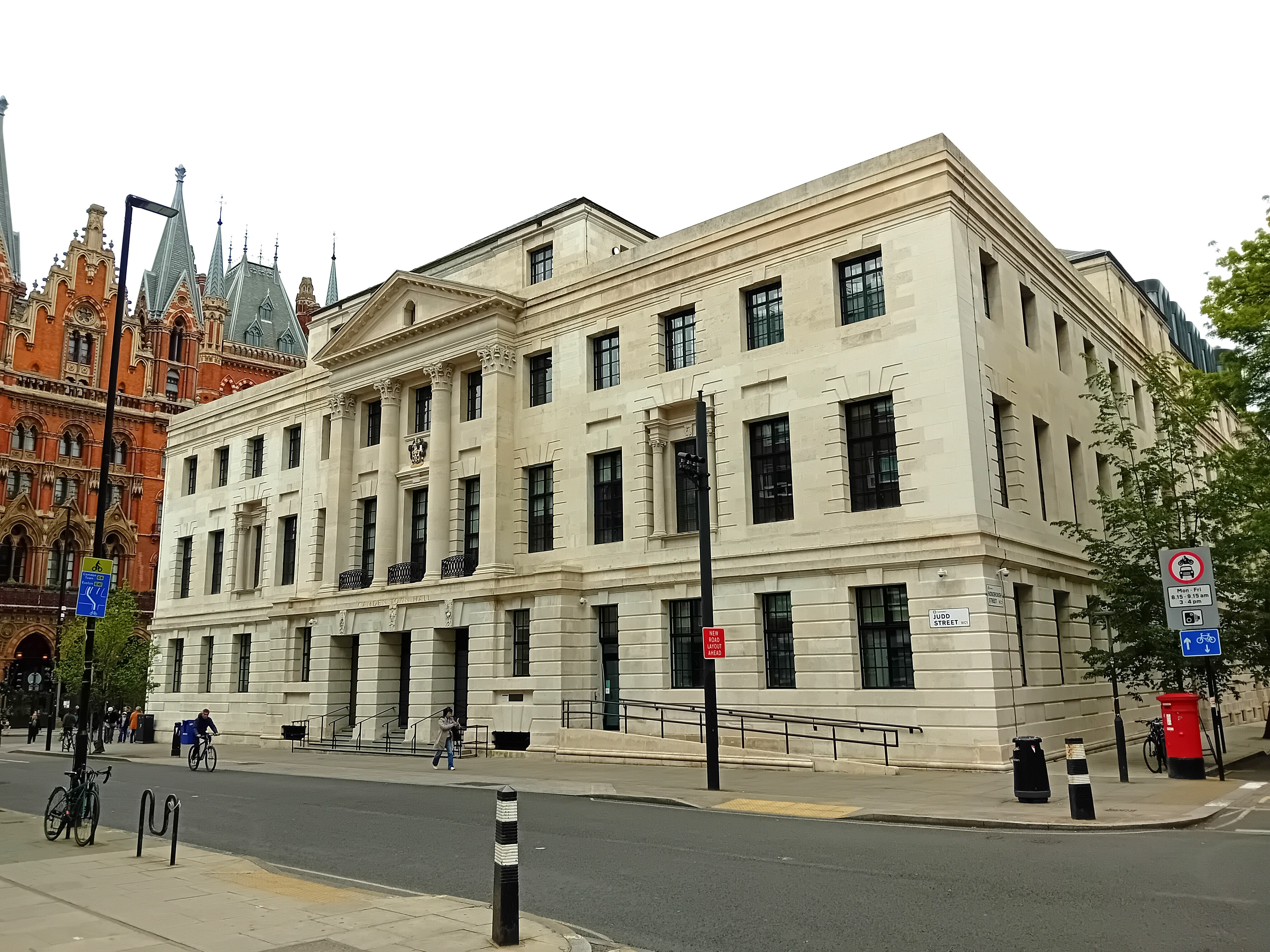
- View from Judd Street in 2024

- Shown in Camden
- 51.5290°N 0.1255°W
- Location: Euston Road, Camden

History
- Built: 1937

Site notes
- Architect: Albert Thomas
- Architectural style: Neoclassical style

Listed Building – Grade II
- Designated: 19 April 1996
- Reference no.: 1379162

Camden Town Hall, known as St Pancras Town Hall until 1965, is the meeting place of Camden London Borough Council. The main entrance is in Judd Street with its northern elevation extending along Euston Road, opposite the main front of St Pancras railway station. It was completed in 1937 and has been Grade II listed since 1996.

== History ==
In the early 20th century, St Pancras Borough Council was based at the 19th century vestry offices in St Pancras Way which had been commissioned for the Parish of St Pancras. After civic leaders found that the vestry offices were inadequate for their needs, they elected to construct a purpose-built facility: the site selected on Euston Road had previously been occupied by some Georgian terraced housing.

The new building was designed by Albert Thomas, who also designed housing schemes for the St Pancras Borough Council, in the neoclassical style. The construction which was undertaken by Dove Brothers of Islington involved a steel frame clad with Portland stone and the work started in 1934. The design involved a symmetrical main frontage with 13 bays facing onto Judd Street; the central section of three bays featured three doorways on the ground floor; there were three windows on each of the first and second floors flanked by huge Corinthian order columns supporting a pediment. A carving of the borough coat of arms was erected above the central window on the first floor. The design for the Euston Road frontage involved 23 bays with two sections designed in a similar style to the Judd Street elevation i.e. with windows flanked by huge Corinthian order columns supporting pediments. Internally, the principal rooms were an assembly hall on the ground floor in the east of the building and the council chamber and mayor's parlour on the first floor in the west of the building. The building was officially opened in October 1937.

In May 1957, the new submarine cable system, TAT-1, was used to transmit a concert by the singer and civil rights activist, Paul Robeson, performing in New York City to an audience in the town hall.

A "Caribbean Carnival", a precursor of the Notting Hill Carnival, was held on 30 January 1959 in the town hall, organised by activist Claudia Jones as a response to the 1958 Notting Hill race riots and the state of race relations in Britain at the time. A few months later, on 27 May 1959, Princess Margaret attended a meeting of the National Society for the Prevention of Cruelty to Children in the town hall.

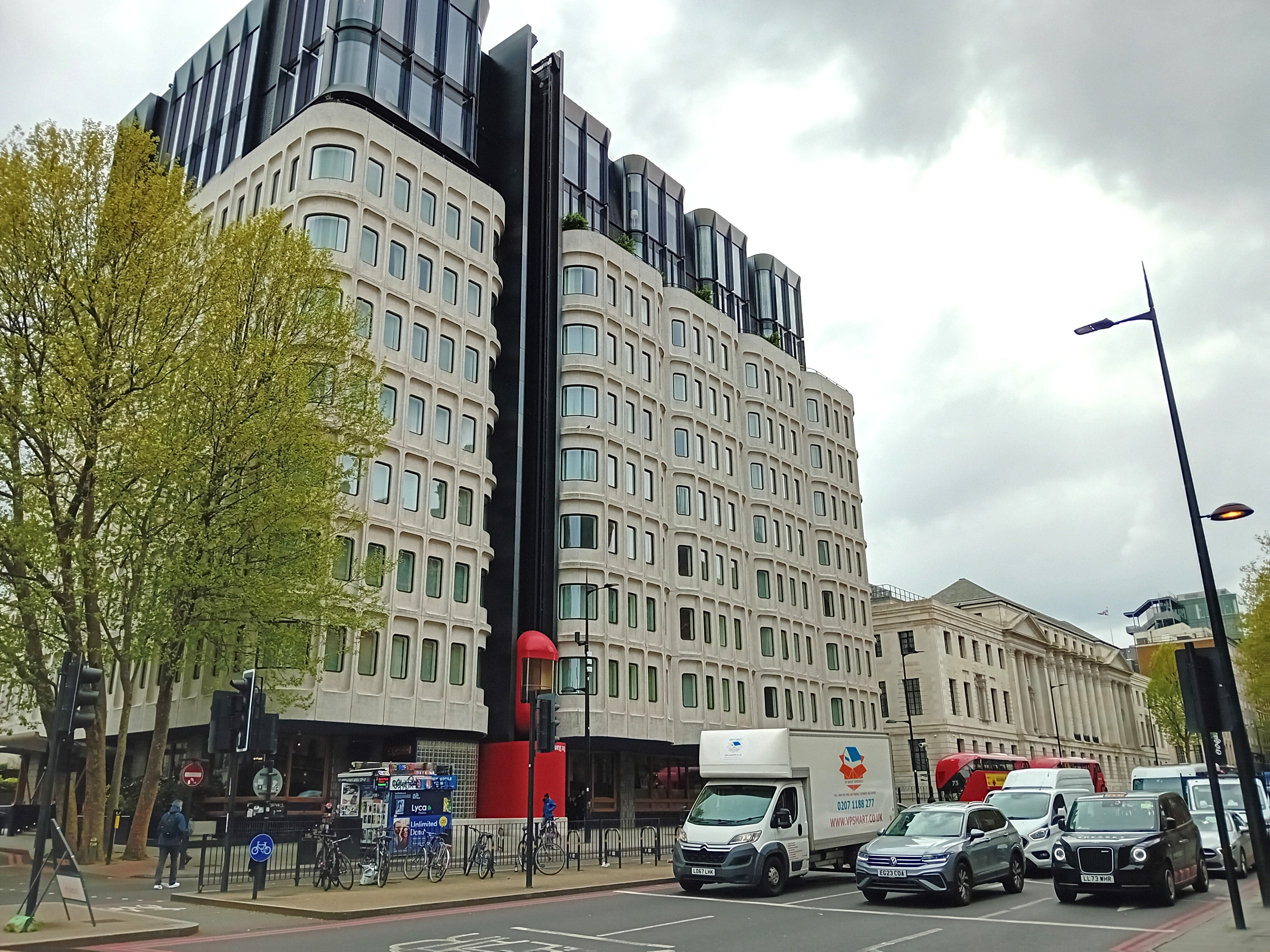
Former Town Hall Annexe (now The Standard hotel) at corner of Argyle Street and Euston Road, with older building's Euston Road elevation in background

The building served as the headquarters of the Metropolitan Borough of St Pancras and continued to operate as the local seat of government after the formation of the London Borough of Camden in 1965. An eight-storey extension designed by the borough architect's department was built to the east of the main building in 1973–1977, known as the Town Hall Annexe. It was designed in a Brutalist architectural style and was clad in white pre-cast panels with curved window corners. A rooftop conservatory was added in the 1990s.

The council vacated the Town Hall Annexe in 2014, moving its main offices to a new building at 5 Pancras Square. The Town Hall Annexe was subsequently converted into a hotel, which opened in 2019.

In February 2020 the council started a programme of refurbishment works to the 1937 building, to plans prepared by Purcell. The works, which were managed by Lendlease at an estimated cost of £40 million, involved restoration of the historic areas used by the council and the redevelopment of the basement and upper floors so those floors can be let out as commercial space. The town hall reopened in 2023, serving once again as the council's meeting place and as an events venue.
