= Communist Students =

Communist Students may refer to two existing organisations:

- Communist Students (Autonomous)
- Communist Students (Young Communist League)
