= Building Workers' Charter =

The Building Workers’ Charter was a workers' rights campaign launched in 1970 with branches in Glasgow, London, Manchester, Wigan, Leicester, Stoke and North Wales by 1971.

They were active in the campaign to abolish the 'Lump Labour Scheme' and played a significant role in the 1972 National Strike.
