= John Madge =

John Madge (1914–1968) was an English sociologist and younger brother of Charles Madge.

== Early life and education ==
Born in 1914, Madge was the son of Lieut Col. C. A. Madge and Barbara, née Hylton Foster, and like his father and brother was educated at Winchester College, and subsequently at Trinity College, Cambridge, where he read economics.

The two Madges were active in the Cambridge University Socialist Society. The Madge brothers were close friends with the poet Gavin Ewart; John and Ewart shared a flat on Gloucester Place and travelled to Austria together in 1938. Cyril Bibby comments with reference to them as well as Maurice Dobb, the twins Francis and Roualeyn Cumming-Bruce, Margot Heinemann and 'the beautiful Eileen Wynne' that 'it was noticeable how many of these extreme left-wingers came from privileged upper-class homes.' (Reminiscences of a Happy Life, p. 171)

== Career ==
Upon graduation, Madge studied at the Architectural Association, qualifying in 1941. Following work at the Ministry of Home Security in a team led by Solly Zuckerman, Madge became a research fellow at Bristol University, leading its Reconstruction Research Group, and subsequently became the first Director of the Nuffield Foundation's Hospital Research Unit. From 1952 to 1960, he was chief sociologist at the Building Research Station of the Department of Scientific and Industrial Research, before leaving to become the Department's Deputy Director of Political & Economic Planning. He was also secretary to the British Sociological Association from 1953 to 1957. In 1965, Madge was appointed Director of the Sociological Research Unit at University College London, and was still with that institution when he died suddenly in August 1968.

== Works ==
Madge published The Rehousing of Britain in 1945 about the need for housing renewal due to war damages, overcrowding, and shifts in population, describing the policies of housing from each political party. He followed this with a 1948 pamphlet, "Human Factor in Housing", which critiqued housing policies in which families were 'fitted into houses, rather than the houses designed round their needs.' Further books included The Tools of Social Science (1953), a clearly presented and quite readable handbook on research methodology in Sociology and related social sciences, The Origins of Scientific Sociology (1959), and a number of books on Urban Sociology.
