= Britain's Road to Socialism =

Political programme of the Communist Party of Britain

- The cover of the 9th edition
- Author: Communist Party of Great Britain (1952–1977); Communist Party of Britain (1989–present)
- Language: English
- Genre: Politics
- Publication date: August 1949 (First Edition); January 1951; 1958; October 1968; March 1978; November 1989; 2001; 31 October 2011; 10 April 2020 (Most Recent Edition)
- Publication place: United Kingdom
- Pages: 71
- ISBN: 978-1-907464-43-0

Britain's Road to Socialism is the political programme of the Communist Party of Britain, and is adhered to by the Young Communist League and the editors of the Morning Star newspaper. First published as The British Road to Socialism in 1951 with the personal approval of Joseph Stalin, it has undergone nine editions over more than seven decades, making it one of the longest-running political programmes in British communist history.

The programme advocates for the establishment of socialism in Britain through a "parliamentary road to socialism", proposing that the working class can lead various political forces in a popular democratic alliance against monopoly capital to achieve a parliamentary majority pledged to socialist transformation. This strategy has generated substantial academic and political debate, with critics arguing it represents a fundamental departure from classical Marxist-Leninist theory on the necessity of revolution.

The document has evolved significantly since its inception, particularly following the 1958 edition which introduced "peaceful transition" language under the influence of Khrushchev's de-Stalinisation process. Modern editions incorporate contemporary concerns such as climate change whilst maintaining the core parliamentary strategy. The programme's controversial approach has created divisions within British communist movements and attracted sustained criticism from both academic analysts and left-wing critics who describe it as theoretically flawed "reformism".

== History ==
The publication of Communist Party programmes in Britain began in the 1920s with the release of Class against Class, the General Election Programme of the Communist Party of Great Britain. This was published in 1929 by the Communist Party of Great Britain (CPGB), the precursor to the Communist Party of Britain, for the general election of that year in which the party fielded 25 candidates. The subsequent programme, titled For Soviet Britain, was published for the party's 13th Congress in 1935. An unnamed draft programme was issued in 1939 but the Second World War and its aftermath delayed the publication of an updated programme until the 1950s.

For Soviet Britain was finally superseded in February 1951 when the CPGB published its new programme The British Road to Socialism. The name of the new programme was likely inspired by a chapter also titled The British Road to Socialism in the 1947 book Looking Ahead by Harry Politt.

The first published edition of the document received the personal approval of Joseph Stalin before publication. The British Road built on themes already present in the Communist Party's 1949 election programme The Socialist Road for Britain, and Stalin's commentary did not suggest significant diversion from the existing policy. Under its original name, it underwent revisions in 1952, 1958, 1968 and 1977.

When the CPGB's leadership abandoned The British Road to Socialism in 1985, elements in the party that remained loyal to the programme, including the then editorial board of The Morning Star, split to form the Communist Party of Britain in 1988. The re-established party published the 6th edition of the programme in 1989, with a revision in 1992 to consider the onset of capitalist restoration in Eastern Europe. Three subsequent editions have been produced with further revisions and a title change to Britain's Road to Socialism. The 7th edition was published in 2001, the 8th in 2011, and the 9th in 2020.

== Content and ideology ==
The programme presents a Marxist analysis arguing that capitalism must be overthrown in the interests of the working class and humanity, and that socialism is the only alternative system that can meet essential human needs whilst ending exploitation and oppression. The strategy identifies how the power of capitalist monopoly corporations and their state can be replaced by state power in the hands of the working class and its allies.

=== Parliamentary strategy ===
Central to the programme is the belief that existing democratic rights and traditional means of struggle can be used to achieve a parliamentary majority pledged to socialism, which would then enact legislation to destroy capitalist power and build a socialist state. The programme advocates that "through an upsurge in working class and popular action, a left government can be elected in Britain based on parliamentary majorities of Labour, socialist, communist and progressive representatives".

However, the programme distinguishes between "government office" and "state power", criticising social democratic parties for confusing the two and failing to involve the working class in extra-parliamentary action to defend progressive governments.

=== Anti-monopoly alliance ===
The strategy centres on building a "broad popular alliance of all sections of society whose interests are threatened by big monopolies", with the core constituted by a united working class and labour movement, defined as the Labour Party, Communist Party, trade unions and cooperative societies. The programme views communist-labour unity as indispensable, with the left winning leadership and a majority in the Labour Party.

=== Critique of capitalism ===
The programme describes capitalism as a system that "increasingly produces 'culture' as it does other commodities – for sale at a profit and for ideological reasons – regardless of social need", turning popular culture into "a commercial, conservative force that promotes ideas of selfishness, greed and individualism". It identifies capitalism's "most fundamental, insoluble contradiction" as being "between the social character of production" and "the private character" of ownership.

=== International perspective ===
The programme takes a strongly anti-imperialist stance.

== Reception and criticism ==
The programme has generated substantial academic and political debate since its inception in 1951, with historian Lawrence Parker noting that it has had "a very difficult history and reception" including within the Communist movement itself.

=== Academic analysis ===
The programme's parliamentary strategy has attracted significant scholarly criticism. Bill Warren, writing in New Left Review in 1970, argued that the strategy was "characterized by grave theoretical ambiguities and unresearched but crucial formulations", particularly criticising the belief that "existing democratic rights and traditional means of struggle must and can be used to achieve a parliamentary majority pledged to socialism" which would then "enact legislation to destroy capitalist power and build a socialist state".

John Ure, in a detailed Marxist critique published in 1972, described the programme as "a dangerous hotch-potch with no clear principles or socialist strategy to guide it, but rather a completely bankrupt reliance upon constitutional and Parliamentary roads". Ure argued that the programme failed to provide any substantive criticism of social democratic approaches and contained "no real element of class struggle".

Academic analysis in Revolutionary Democracy highlighted fundamental theoretical problems, arguing that "the main problem with the British Road is its view of a parliamentary road to socialism", noting that Marx and Engels had demonstrated that "the working class cannot simply lay hold of the ready-made state machinery, and wield it for its own purposes".

=== Internal party disputes ===
The programme was never enthusiastically adopted by the CPGB itself. Parker notes that "the BRS was simply imposed on the CPGB by its leadership in 1951 (as was subsequently admitted by Rajani Palme Dutt), after general secretary Harry Pollitt" had secured Stalin's approval. Members of the party's pro-Soviet left in the 1960s and 1970s "saw the BRS as a piece of silly reformist window dressing wheeled out during election time, with the real business of revolution being something that involved taking up arms and the use of force".

The programme's contradictions became apparent as the party leadership simultaneously promoted anti-revisionist rhetoric whilst maintaining a strategy premised on the Labour Party leading Britain's socialist revolution. This created what Parker describes as an "extreme scepticism as to the likelihood, as imagined by the BRS, of the patriotic Labour left leading the struggle towards the first steps of socialism through parliament".

=== Contemporary criticism ===
Modern left-wing critics have argued that the programme represents a fundamental departure from revolutionary Marxist principles. The CPGB-ML's analysis describes it as embodying "the anti-Marxist and anti-Leninist notion of British exceptionalism", suggesting Britain could achieve socialism through "peaceful election of a coalition of Communist and Labour MPs who would use Parliament as a platform for progressive reforms".

Critics argue that despite "yielding negative results for seven decades, the CPB continues to stick fast to its Road to Nowhere programme, holding ever more tightly to the utterly discredited shiboleth that Labour is the party of the working class". This criticism intensified following the defeat of Jeremy Corbyn's Labour leadership, which many supporters of the programme had viewed as validation of their parliamentary strategy.

=== Historical assessment ===
Recent scholarship by Joe and John Pateman has examined Stalin's direct influence on the programme's development, revealing that Stalin was "not only instrumental in changing the scope of the CPGB strategy, from short-term electoral platforms to a long-term programme" but was also "influential in determining the content of this programme". This research has added to scholarly understanding of how the programme represented a significant departure from previous CPGB positions whilst maintaining international communist backing.

== Evolution and revisions ==
The programme has undergone substantial evolution across its nine editions, reflecting both changing global circumstances and internal communist movement debates. The original 1951 programme was notably concise, "covering just 8 short sections", in contrast to the current edition which critics describe as running to "70 meandering and contradictory pages".

=== Major doctrinal shifts ===
The most significant theoretical change occurred between the 1952 and 1958 editions. According to analysis in Revolutionary Democracy, "The British Road of 1951 (and 1952) do not specifically talk of a peaceful transition to socialism – this was a 'contribution' of the version drafted in 1957 and finalised in 1958, under the influence of the revisionist, anti-Marxist-Leninist positions of the 20th Congress of the CPSU in 1956". The 1951 edition had instead warned that capitalists would "offer an active resistance to the decisions of the People's Government" and that "the British people and the People's Government should be ready decisively to rebuff such attempts".

This shift towards "peaceful transition" represented a fundamental departure from classical Marxist-Leninist theory on the necessity of revolution, coinciding with Khrushchev's de-Stalinisation process in the Soviet Union.

=== Organisational revisions ===
The 1977 edition underwent particularly extensive revision, with "over 2,600 amendments submitted by Branches and District Committees" culminating in decisions at the party's 35th National Congress. This edition reflected growing internal tensions within the CPGB between pro-Soviet elements and those supporting Eurocommunist positions.

=== Post-1989 adaptations ===
Following the collapse of socialist states in Eastern Europe, the 1989 edition was revised in 1992 to "consider the onset of capitalist restoration in Eastern Europe". The programme underwent significant theoretical adjustments to account for the new global situation, including a reassessment of the viability of existing socialist models.

Subsequent editions in 2001, 2011, and 2020 have incorporated contemporary concerns, particularly environmental issues. The current edition emphasises climate change as a central concern, arguing that "far-reaching policies and action to reduce carbon emissions" must be included in any socialist strategy.

=== Title change ===
The programme's title was changed from "The British Road to Socialism" to "Britain's Road to Socialism" with the 7th edition in 2001, reflecting the Communist Party of Britain's adoption and continuation of the programme following the CPGB's dissolution.
