= GCT Giles =

British communist and educator (1891–1976)

- Born: Granville Charles Trelawney Giles; 9 May 1891
- Died: 30 October 1976 (aged 85)
- Education: Eton College; University of Cambridge
- Occupations: Teacher, officer in the British army, journalist
- Known for: Leading British communist. Leading British educational activist. Playing a central role in the evacuation of children during WWII. First communist to become president of the National Union of Teachers
- Notable work: The New School Tie (1946)
- Political party: Labour (until 1926); CPGB (1926–1976)

Granville Charles Trelawney Giles (Note: Graham Stevenson, in his Encyclopedia of Communist Biographies, identifies Giles's first middle name as 'Courtney'. However, most other sources, including Giles's MI5 file, record it as 'Charles'. 'Trelawney' is also sometimes spelled 'Trelawny'. For more information about the MI5 file, see 'Granville Charles Trelawney GILES: British.', National Archives. Retrieved 12 February 2023.) (9 May 1891 – 30 October 1976), known as GCT Giles, was a leading British communist, most famous for playing a central role in the evacuation of three million children to the countryside during World War II, and for playing a prominent role in the formation of Britain's post-war educational reforms. Despite being educated at both Eton College and the University of Cambridge, he was a supporter of the comprehensive school system, fighting for the rights of working-class children and teachers. He was also the first communist to be appointed president of the National Union of Teachers (NUT), and headed a school which following his retirement became one of Britain's first comprehensive schools.

Giles became a communist after visiting the Soviet Union in 1925. He joined the Communist Party of Great Britain (CPGB) during the 1926 United Kingdom general strike, and would remain a lifelong member. Later in life, he became the target of anti-communist witch-hunts, which led him to lose his position temporarily on the executive of the NUT. Despite suffering from political persecution, he made a significant contribution to British educational policy, directly influencing the pattern of educational reform in the period immediately following World War II, and greatly improving the working conditions of British teachers.

== Early and young adult life ==
GCT Giles was born in 1891 and educated at Eton College. During his time there, his "fag" (boy servant) was future Conservative Prime Minister Harold Macmillan. After leaving Eton he was a scholar at King's College, Cambridge, and in 1913 was awarded a first-class (division two) in Part I of the Classical Tripos. Giles first came into contact with socialist theories while studying in Germany that same year. In 1914 World War I broke out, in which he fought as a British Army officer. After suffering a mental breakdown caused by the stress of the war, he began re-examining his beliefs.

"Three years of war and the loss of many of my friends put me in hospital with a bad breakdown. I began to think and read."

After being dismissed by the army on grounds of ill health, Giles worked with disabled British military servicemen for the YMCA. He then spent time as a teacher and journalist abroad, serving as a professor of English at the Public Commercial School in Athens and as Brice Mackinnon Classics Master at Geelong Grammar School in Victoria, Australia. Upon returning to Britain, he was appointed senior Latin master at Latymer Upper School in Hammersmith.

As a young man Giles was briefly a member of the Labour Party and Teacher's Labour League. However, in 1925 he visited the Soviet Union, an event which had a profound effect on his political outlook and solidified his budding socialist beliefs. Soon after his return he joined both the National Union of Teachers (NUT) and the Communist Party of Great Britain (CPGB), becoming a lifelong member of both organisations. He became immersed in active politics very quickly thereafter, working with the CPGB during the general strike the following year. It was in 1926 that he also became the headmaster of Acton County Grammar School for Boys, a position he held until retirement in 1956. Outside of the communist movement, his greatest political influences of that period were Sylvia Pankhurst and E. D. Morel.

== Anti-fascist and socialist activism in the 1930s ==
During the 1930s Giles worked to support victimised teachers from Spain and Germany, where rising fascist movements had placed many academics in danger. Giles was associated with an organisation known as the International Committee for the Relief of Victimised Teachers, and was also a member of the national committee of the British Committee for the Relief of German Teachers. Being especially interested in Spanish politics, he acted as the star and commentator of the documentary Spanish A.B.C. (1938), directed by Thorold Dickinson and produced by Sidney Cole. Giles later narrated a second film, Behind the Spanish Lines (1938).

From 1931 onwards, Giles played a significant role in the Communist Party's Teachers’ Advisory Committee. He organised and led several groups of teachers to Russia with the sponsorship of the Soviet Union. Fighting for higher wages and better conditions for British educators, he was repeatedly (and unanimously) elected the leader of the Middlesex Teachers’ Panel, which under his leadership was frequently successful in its negotiations with the County Authority. Using his position as a senior figure in the NUT (see below), he also managed to convince many fellow leading union members to oppose the release from prison of Oswald Mosley, the leader of the British Union of Fascists.

== Educational activism ==
=== Evacuation of children during World War II ===
Giles played a central role in evacuating children during World War II. Following the outbreak of the war, he emerged as a senior figure in the NUT and was appointed leader of the head office at Hamilton House, the organisation that prepared the evacuation of teachers and young children from cities likely to be bombed by the German airforce. Operation Pied Piper, assisted by a team headed by Giles and carried out by 100,000 teachers and parents, successfully evacuated over three million British children to the countryside without a single fatality. This evacuation was the single largest mass migration of civilians in British history, and its success would see Giles's position rapidly rise within both the NUT and the CPGB.

=== Activities as first communist president of the NUT ===
In 1937 Giles was elected to the NUT executive, where he remained until 1949. In 1941 he was elected vice-president of the union, and three years later, in 1944, became its president, the first communist ever to hold that position. That same year, the Education Act 1944 was introduced by the President of the Board of Education, R. A. Butler. Although Giles personally felt that the Act did not go far enough to address issues concerning income inequality, he and many other similarly-minded education reformers were satisfied enough with its provisions to throw their weight behind it. Upon becoming NUT president, he worked hard to support the Act, speaking at over 200 meetings in a single year discussing both the parliamentary Bill and the Act itself. Giles was also selected by Butler to tour and give speeches at sites throughout the UK where Allied troops were preparing for the Normandy landings (D-Day).

==== The New School Tie (1946) ====
After World War II was over, Giles's position as president of the NUT allowed him to influence the direction of Britain's post-war educational reforms. In 1946 he published his most famous work, The New School Tie (1946). This campaigning pamphlet was dedicated to supporting the Education Act 1944. Within this work, Giles argued strongly that the quality of education that a child receives should not be determined by their family wealth. The New School Tie proved to be very popular with his contemporaries and has been described by historians as a clear expression of post-war radical populism.

=== Anti-communist persecution ===
In 1948, forged leaflets were circulated, purportedly belonging to a non-existent organisation called the "Young Communist Action Group", which claimed to show secret plans of how communists could take over the NUT leadership. As a consequence of this hoax, Giles lost his position on the NUT executive committee, although he would be re-elected in 1952. An investigation by the NUT and communist activists into the hoax failed to discover the source of the leaflets. Despite this mystery, Giles continued to be the focus of attacks by anti-communist politicians for many years afterwards. A number of MPs, especially the Conservative backbencher John Eden, took advantage of the safeguards against libellous speech in parliament to slander and attack Giles, leading to partial bans on communists joining certain teaching professions. These McCarthyist attacks and slander campaigns against British communists led to many teachers losing their jobs, including Margaret Clarke, John Mansfield, and J.T. Jones.

== Later life ==
Giles married Olivia Winifred Watterson, a feminist and left-wing journalist, in 1915, with whom he had two sons. Winifred died in 1927. The same year, Giles married fellow lifelong communist activist Elisabeth (Betsy) Shoesmith. For many years they lived in Chiswick, including a period of time spent sharing a house with the trade union official J. O. N. Vickers and his wife Freddie. According to his obituary in The Times, Giles was a lifelong member of Marylebone Cricket Club (MCC).

Giles remained an active communist during the post-war years, and from 1945 to 1952 he served on the executive committee of the CPGB. In 1968 both he and Max Morris, who later became the second communist president of the NUT, endorsed the executive committee's decision to oppose the Warsaw Pact invasion of Czechoslovakia.

Giles died on 30 October 1976. After his death, many of his possessions were donated to the Working Class Movement Library.

== See also ==
- Thora Silverthorne
- Jessie Eden
- Communist Party of Great Britain
- Young Communist League
- National Union of Teachers
