= Foundation Congress of the Communist Party of Great Britain =

Congress of the Communist Party of Great Britain

The Foundation Congress of the Communist Party of Great Britain was held at Cannon Street Hotel, and the International Socialist Club, in London on the 31 July – 1 August, 1920. It occurred after the Workers Socialist Federation had set up the Communist Party (British Section of the Third International) (CP(BSTI)) at a conference held on 19–20 June 1920 also at the International Socialist Club. The CP(BTSI) had been established by left Communists who were unhappy with the parliamentarianism and close relationship with the Labour Party proposed by Lenin.

In a resolution proposed by Alf Purcell the Congress declared:

“The Communists in conference assembled declare for the Soviet (or Workers’ Council) system as a means whereby the working class shall achieve power and take control of the forces of production; declare for the dictatorship of the proletariat as a necessary means for combating the counter-revolution during the transition period between capitalism and communism; and stand for the adoption of these means as steps towards the establishment of a system of complete communism wherein all the means of production shall be communally owned and controlled. This conference therefore establishes itself the Communist Party on the foregoing basis and declares its adherence to the Third International.”
