= Marxist schools of thought =

Group perspectives regarding Marxism

Marxism is a method of socioeconomic analysis that originates in the works of 19th century German philosophers Karl Marx and Friedrich Engels. Marxism analyzes and critiques the development of class society and especially of capitalism as well as the role of class struggles in systemic, economic, social and political change. It frames capitalism through a paradigm of exploitation and analyzes class relations and social conflict using a materialist interpretation of historical development (now known as "historical materialism") – materialist in the sense that the politics and ideas of an epoch are determined by the way in which material production is carried on.

From the late 19th century onward, Marxism has developed from Marx's original revolutionary critique of classical political economy and materialist conception of history into a comprehensive, complete world-view. There are now many different branches and schools of thought, resulting in a discord of the single definitive Marxist theory. Different Marxian schools place a greater emphasis on certain aspects of classical Marxism while rejecting or modifying other aspects. Some schools of thought have sought to combine Marxian concepts and non-Marxian concepts which has then led to contradictory conclusions.

Marxism–Leninism and its offshoots are the most well-known Marxist schools of thought as they were a driving force in international relations during most of the 20th century.

== Marxism ==
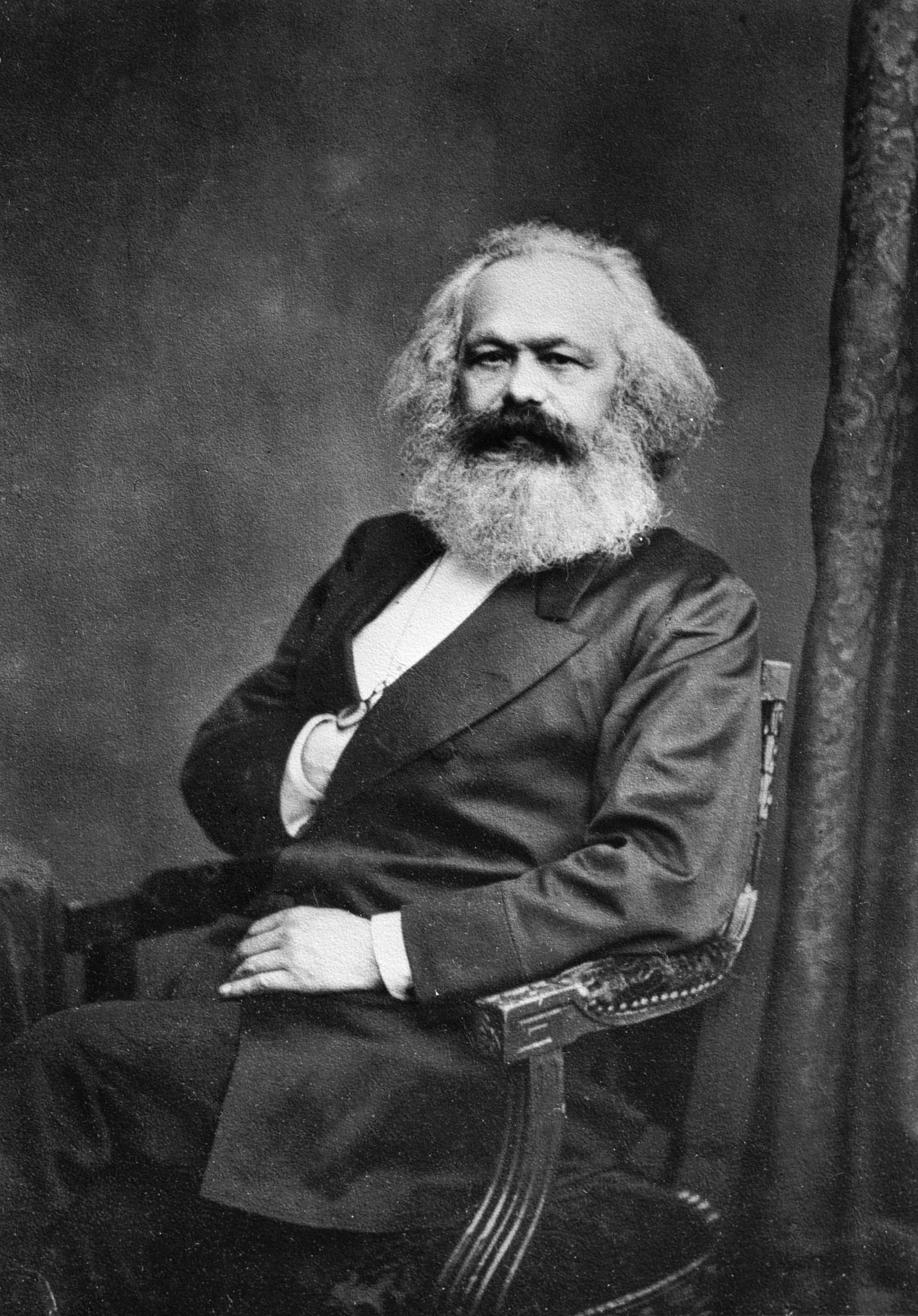
Karl Marx

Marxism analyzes the material conditions and the economic activities required to fulfill human material needs to explain social phenomena within any given society. It assumes that the form of economic organization, or mode of production, influences all other social phenomena—including wider social relations, political institutions, legal systems, cultural systems, aesthetics, and ideologies; this serves as the fundamental axiom of Marxist thought. The economic system and these social relations form a base and superstructure. As forces of production improve, existing forms of organizing production become obsolete and hinder further progress. As Karl Marx observed: "At a certain stage of development, the material productive forces of society come into conflict with the existing relations of production or—this merely expresses the same thing in legal terms—with the property relations within the framework of which they have operated hitherto. From forms of development of the productive forces these relations turn into their fetters. Then begins an era of social revolution". These inefficiencies manifest themselves as social contradictions in society which are, in turn, fought out at the level of the class struggle.

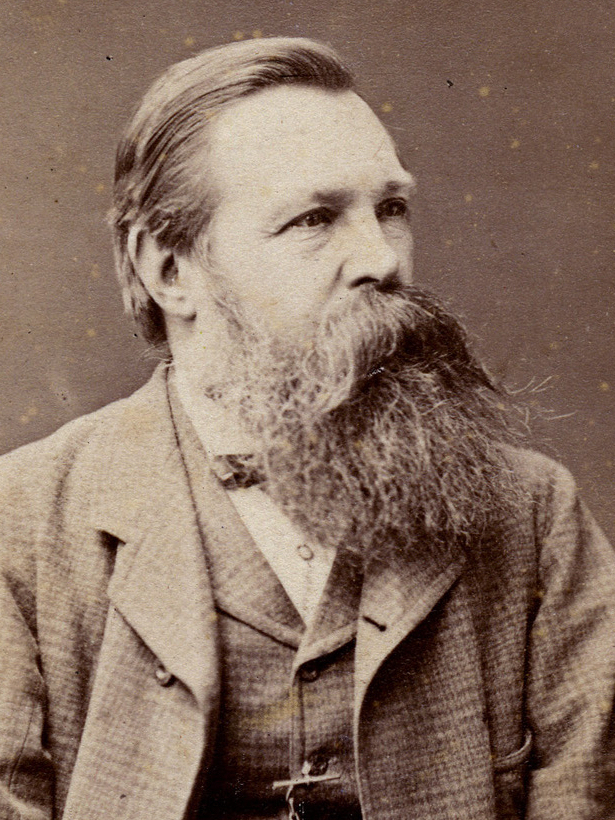
Friedrich Engels

Under the capitalist mode of production, this struggle materializes between the minority (the bourgeoisie) who own the means of production and the vast majority of the population (the proletariat) who produce goods and services. Starting with the conjectural premise that social change occurs because of the struggle between different classes within society who are under contradiction against each other, a Marxist would conclude that capitalism exploits and oppresses the proletariat, therefore capitalism will inevitably lead to a proletarian revolution. In a socialist society, private property—in the form of the means of production—would be replaced by co-operative ownership. A socialist economy would not base production on the creation of private profits, but on the criteria of satisfying human needs—that is, production would be carried out directly for use. As Friedrich Engels said: "Then the capitalist mode of appropriation in which the product enslaves first the producer, and then the appropriator, is replaced by the mode of appropriation of the product that is based upon the nature of the modern means of production; upon the one hand, direct social appropriation, as means to the maintenance and extension of production on the other, direct individual appropriation, as means of subsistence and of enjoyment".

Marxian economics and its proponents view capitalism as economically unsustainable and incapable of improving the living standards of the population due to its need to compensate for falling rates of profit by cutting employee's wages, social benefits and pursuing military aggression. The socialist system would succeed capitalism as humanity's mode of production through workers' revolution. According to Marxian crisis theory, socialism is not an inevitability, but an economic necessity.

Classical Marxism is the economic, philosophical and sociological theories expounded by Marx and Engels as contrasted with later developments in Marxism, especially Leninism and Marxism–Leninism. Orthodox Marxism is the body of Marxism thought that emerged after the death of Marx and which became the official philosophy of the socialist movement as represented in the Second International until World War I in 1914. Orthodox Marxism aims to simplify, codify and systematize Marxist method and theory by clarifying the perceived ambiguities and contradictions of classical Marxism. The philosophy of orthodox Marxism includes the understanding that material development (advances in technology in the productive forces) is the primary agent of change in the structure of society and of human social relations and that social systems and their relations (e.g. feudalism, capitalism and so on) become contradictory and inefficient as the productive forces develop, which results in some form of social revolution arising in response to the mounting contradictions. This revolutionary change is the vehicle for fundamental society-wide changes and ultimately leads to the emergence of new economic systems.

As a term, orthodox Marxism represents the methods of historical materialism and of dialectical materialism and not the normative aspects inherent to classical Marxism, without implying dogmatic adherence to the results of Marx's investigations.

== Leninism ==
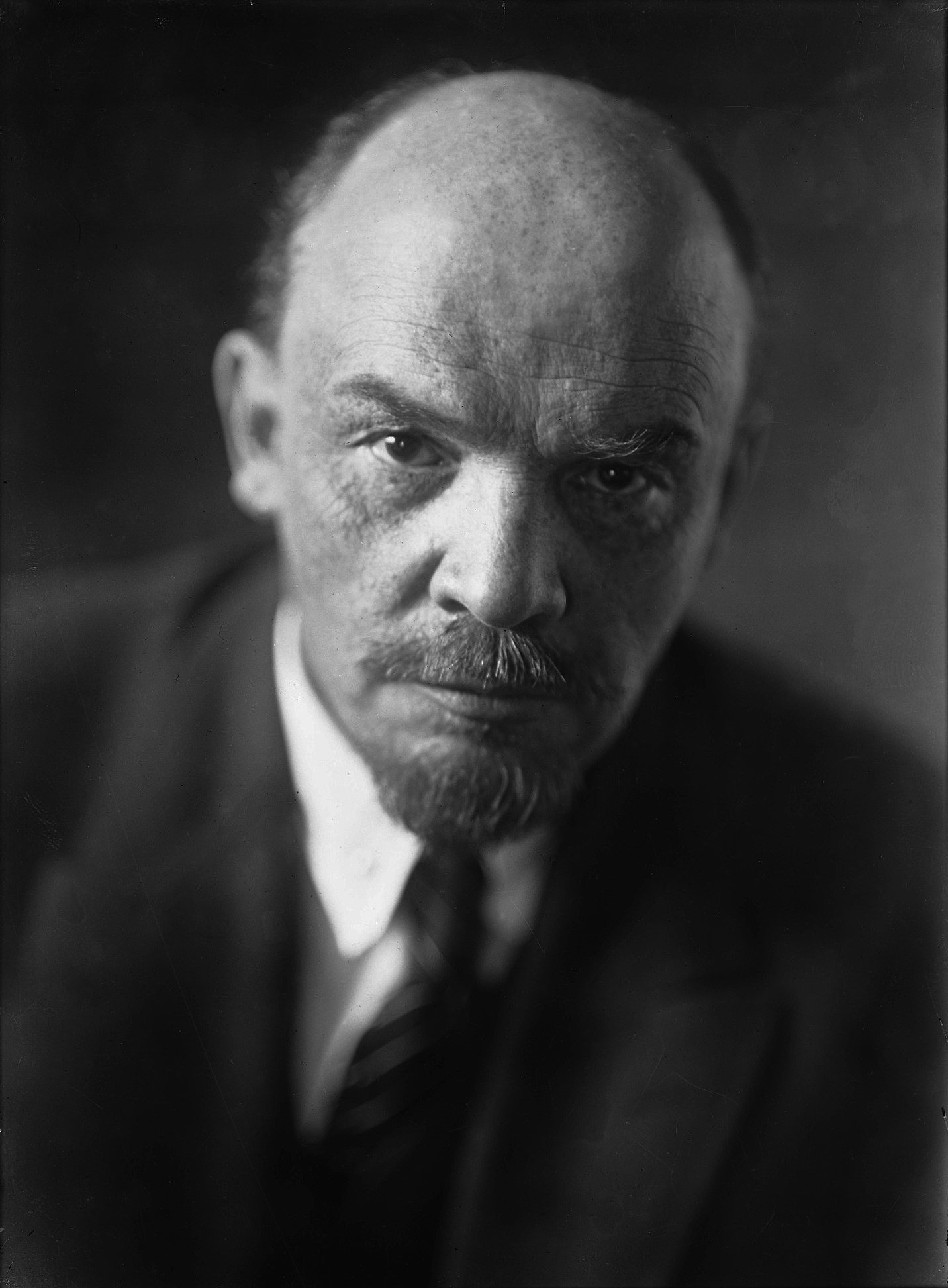
Vladimir Lenin

Leninism is the body of political theory developed by and named after the Russian revolutionary and later Soviet premier Vladimir Lenin for the democratic organisation of a revolutionary vanguard party and the achievement of a dictatorship of the proletariat as political prelude to the establishment of socialism. Leninism comprises socialist political and economic theories developed from Marxism as well as Lenin's interpretations of Marxist theory for practical application to the socio-political conditions of the agrarian early 20th-century Russian Empire. Leninism was the Russian application of Marxist economics and political philosophy, effected and realised by the Bolsheviks, the vanguard party who led the fight for the political independence of the working class. In 1903, Lenin stated:

We want to achieve a new and better order of society: in this new and better society there must be neither rich nor poor; all will have to work. Not a handful of rich people, but all the working people must enjoy the fruits of their common labour. Machines and other improvements must serve to ease the work of all and not to enable a few to grow rich at the expense of millions and tens of millions of people. This new and better society is called socialist society. The teachings about this society are called 'socialism'.

The most important consequence of a Leninist-style theory of imperialism is the strategic need for workers in the industrialized countries to bloc or ally with the oppressed nations contained within their respective countries' colonies abroad to overthrow capitalism. This is the source of the slogan, which shows the Leninist conception that not only the proletariat—as is traditional to Marxism—are the sole revolutionary force, but all oppressed people: "Workers and Oppressed Peoples of the World, Unite!" The other distinguishing characteristic of Leninism is how it approaches the question of organization. Lenin believed that the traditional model of the social democratic parties of the time, a loose, multi-tendency organization, was inadequate for overthrowing the Tsarist regime in Russia. He proposed a cadre of professional revolutionaries that disciplined itself under the model of democratic centralism.

== Left communism ==
Left communism is the range of communist viewpoints held by the communist left, which criticizes the political ideas of the Bolsheviks from a position that is asserted to be more authentically Marxist and proletarian than the views of Leninism held by the Communist International after its first two congresses.

Two major traditions exist among the left communist movements; the Dutch-German current and the Italian current. Although the two have persisted to the modern day, they exist in vastly different states, with the Dutch-German current being mostly intellectual & the Italian being a major political movement.

== Luxemburgism ==
Luxemburgism is an informal designation for a current of Marxist thought and practice that originates from the ideas and work of Rosa Luxemburg. In particular, it stresses the importance for spontaneous revolution which can only emerge in response to mounting contradictions between the productive forces and social relations of society and therefore rejects Leninism and Bolshevism for its insistence on a "hands-on" approach to revolution. Luxemburgism is also highly critical of the reformist Marxism that emerged from the work of Eduard Bernstein's informal faction of the Social Democratic Party of Germany. According to Rosa Luxemburg, under reformism "[capitalism] is not overthrown, but is on the contrary strengthened by the development of social reforms".

== Council communism ==
Council communism is a movement originating from Germany and the Netherlands in the 1920s. The Communist Workers' Party of Germany (KAPD) was the primary organization that espoused council communism. Council communism continues today as a theoretical and activist position within both Marxism and libertarian socialism, through a few groups in Europe and North America. As such, it is referred to as anti-authoritarian and anti-Leninist Marxism.

In contrast to reformist social democracy and to Leninism, the central argument of council communism is that democratic workers councils arising in factories and municipalities are the natural form of working class organisation and governmental power. The government and the economy should be managed by workers' councils composed of delegates elected at workplaces and recallable at any moment. As such, council communists oppose authoritarian socialism, and command economies such as state socialism and state capitalism. They also oppose the idea of a revolutionary party since council communists believe that a party-led revolution will necessarily produce a party dictatorship. This view is also opposed to the social democratic and Marxist–Leninist ideologies, with their stress on parliaments and institutional government (i.e. by applying social reforms) on the one hand and vanguard parties and participative democratic centralism on the other. Council communists see the mass strike and new yet to emerge forms of mass action as revolutionary means to achieve a communist society. Where the network of worker councils would be the main vehicle for revolution, acting as the apparatus by which the dictatorship of the proletariat forms and operates. Council communism and other types of libertarian Marxism such as autonomism are often viewed as being similar to anarchism due to similar criticisms of Leninist ideologies for being authoritarian and the rejection of the idea of a vanguard party.

== Trotskyism ==
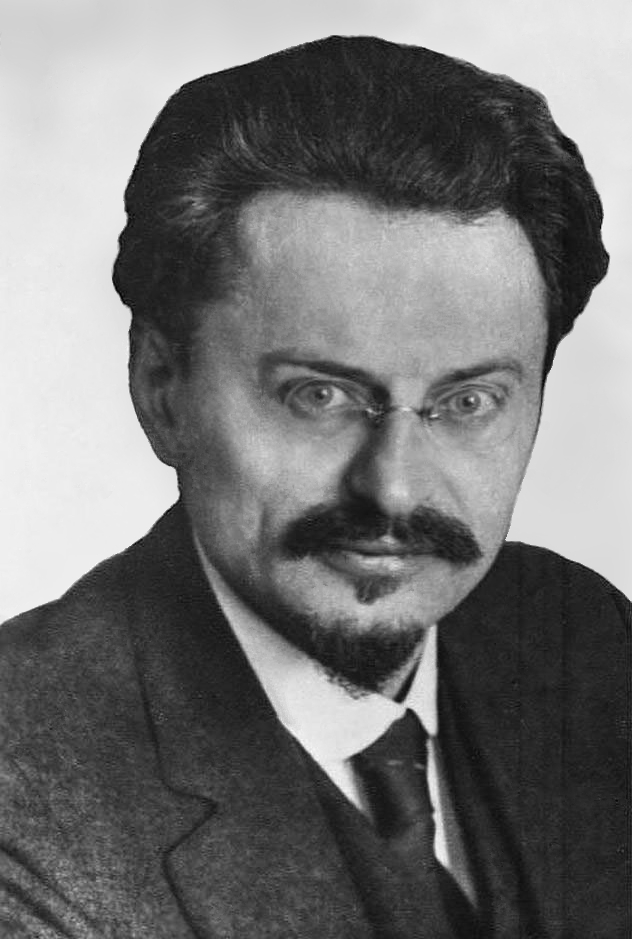
Leon Trotsky

Trotskyism is the branch as advocated by Russian Marxist Leon Trotsky, a contemporary of Lenin from the early years of the Russian Social Democratic Labour Party, where he led a small trend in competition with both Lenin's Bolsheviks and the Mensheviks. Opposed to Stalinism, Trotskyism supports the theory of permanent revolution and world revolution instead of the two stage theory and socialism in one country. It supported proletarian internationalism and another communist revolution in the Soviet Union which Trotsky claimed had become a degenerated worker's state under the leadership of Stalin in which class relations had re-emerged in a new form, rather than the dictatorship of the proletariat.

Struggling against Stalin for power in the Soviet Union, Trotsky and his supporters organized into the Left Opposition and their platform became known as Trotskyism. Stalin eventually succeeded in gaining control of the Soviet regime and Trotskyist attempts to remove Stalin from power resulted in Trotsky's exile from the Soviet Union in 1929. While in exile, Trotsky continued his campaign against Stalin, founding in 1938 the Fourth International, a Trotskyist rival to the Communist International. In August 1940, Trotsky was assassinated in Mexico City on Stalin's orders.

Trotsky's followers claim to be the heirs of Lenin in the same way that mainstream Marxist–Leninists do. There are several distinguishing characteristics of this school of thought—foremost is the theory of permanent revolution. This stated that in less-developed countries the bourgeoisie were too weak to lead their own bourgeois-democratic revolutions. Due to this weakness, it fell to the proletariat to carry out the bourgeois revolution. With power in its hands, the proletariat would then continue this revolution permanently, transforming it from a national bourgeois revolution to a socialist international revolution. Trotsky and Trotskyists also differed markedly from Marxist-Leninists (Stalinists) in their support for political pluralism, worker’s participation and a greater degree of decentralisation in economic planning.

Another shared characteristic between Trotskyists is a variety of theoretical justifications for their negative appraisal of the post-Lenin Soviet Union after Trotsky was expelled by a majority vote from the All-Union Communist Party (Bolsheviks) and subsequently from the Soviet Union. As a consequence, Trotsky defined the Soviet Union under Stalin as a planned economy ruled over by a bureaucratic caste. Trotsky advocated overthrowing the government of the Soviet Union after he was expelled from it.

== Marxism–Leninism ==
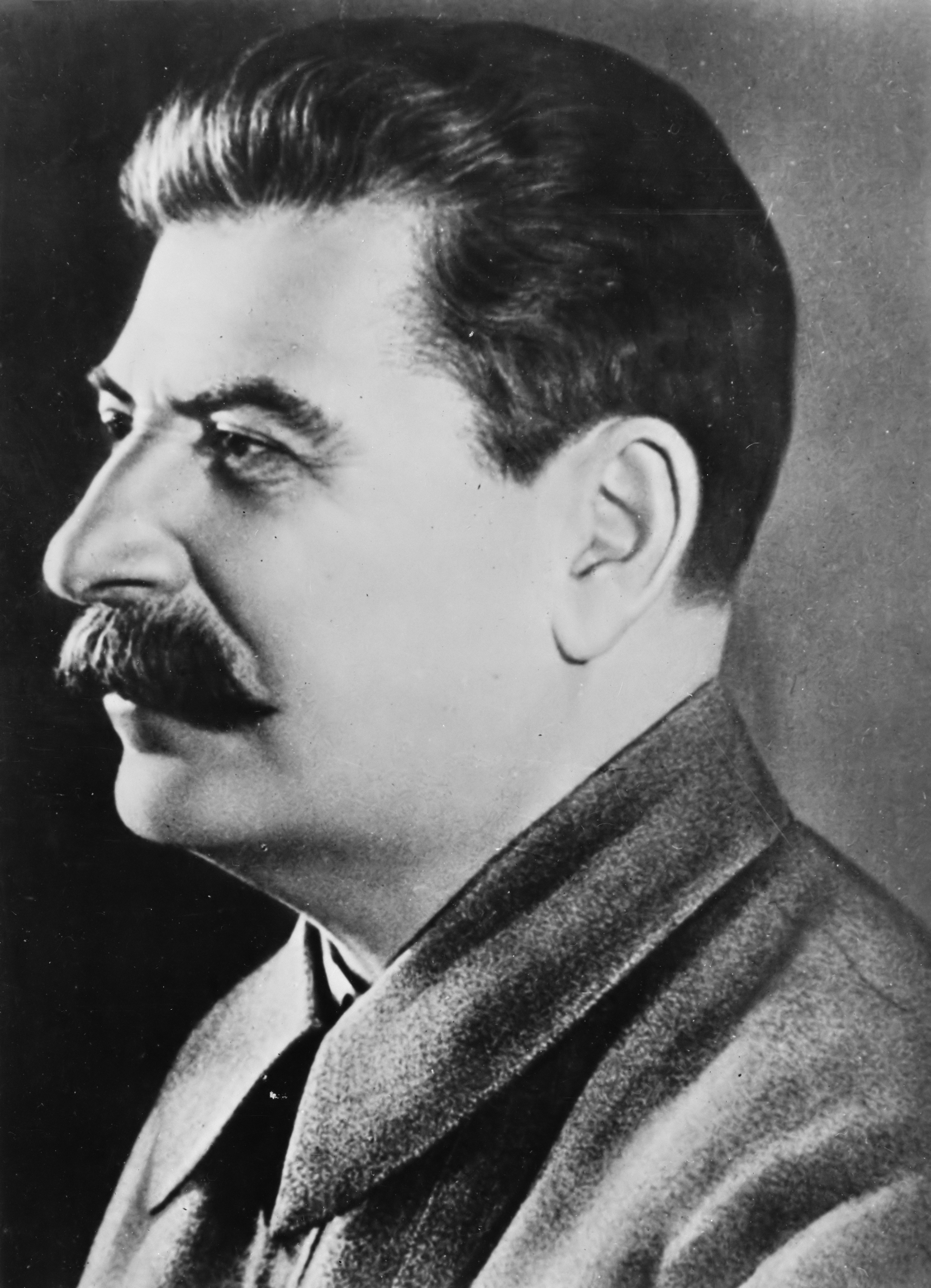
Joseph Stalin

Marxism–Leninism is a political ideology developed by Joseph Stalin which according to its proponents is based in Marxism and Leninism. The term describes the specific political ideology which Stalin implemented in the Soviet Union and in a global scale in the Comintern. There is no definite agreement between historians of about whether Stalin actually followed the principles of Marx and Lenin. It also contains aspects which according to some are deviations from Marxism such as socialism in one country.

Marxism–Leninism was the ideology of the most clearly visible communist movement and is the most prominent ideology associated with communism. It refers to the socioeconomic system and political ideology implemented by Stalin in the Soviet Union and later copied by other states based on the Soviet model (central planning, collectivization of agriculture, communist party-led state, rapid industrialization, nationalization of the commanding heights of the economy and the theory of socialism in one country) whereas Stalinism refers to Stalin's style of governance (cult of personality and a totalitarian state). Marxism–Leninism was the official state ideology of the Soviet Union and the other ruling parties making up the Eastern Bloc as well as the parties of the Communist International after Bolshevization. Today, Marxism–Leninism is the ideology of several parties around the world and remains the official ideology of the ruling parties of China, Cuba, Laos and Vietnam.

At the 20th Congress of the Communist Party of the Soviet Union, Nikita Khrushchev made several ideological ruptures with his predecessor, Joseph Stalin. First, Khrushchev denounced the cult of personality that had developed around Stalin, although Khrushchev himself had a pivotal role in fostering decades earlier. Khrushchev rejected the heretofore orthodox Marxist–Leninist tenet that class struggle continues even under socialism, but rather the state ought to rule in the name of all classes. A related principle that flowed from the former was the notion of peaceful coexistence, or that the newly emergent socialist bloc could peacefully compete with the capitalist world, solely by developing the productive forces of society. Anti-revisionism is a faction within Marxist–Leninism that rejects Khrushchev's theses. This school of thought holds that Khrushchev was unacceptably altering or revising the fundamental tenets of Marxism–Leninism, a stance from which the label anti-revisionist is derived.

== Maoism ==
Maoism (Chinese: 毛泽东思想; pinyin: Máo Zédōng sīxiǎng; lit. 'Mao Zedong Thought') is the theory that Mao Zedong developed for realising a socialist revolution in the agricultural, pre-industrial society of the Republic of China and later the People's Republic of China. The philosophical difference between Maoism and Marxism–Leninism is that the peasantry are the revolutionary vanguard in pre-industrial societies rather than the proletariat. This updating and adaptation of Marxism–Leninism to Chinese conditions in which revolutionary praxis is primary and ideological orthodoxy is secondary represents urban Marxism–Leninism adapted to pre-industrial China. The claim that Mao had adapted Marxism–Leninism to Chinese conditions evolved into the idea that he had updated it in a fundamental way applying to the world as a whole.

From the 1950s until the reform and opening up of Deng Xiaoping in the late 1970s, Maoism was the political and military ideology of the Chinese Communist Party and of Maoist revolutionary movements throughout the world. After the Sino-Soviet split of the 1960s, the Chinese Communist Party and the Communist Party of the Soviet Union claimed to be the sole heir and successor to Joseph Stalin concerning the correct interpretation of Marxism–Leninism and ideological leader of world communism.

In the late 1970s, the Peruvian communist party Shining Path developed and synthesized Maoism into Marxism–Leninism–Maoism, a contemporary variety of Marxism–Leninism that is a supposed higher level of Marxism–Leninism that can be applied universally.

== Libertarian Marxism ==
Libertarian Marxism is a broad range of economic and political philosophies that emphasize the anti-authoritarian aspects of Marxism. Early currents of libertarian Marxism, known as left communism, emerged in opposition to Marxism–Leninism and its derivatives, such as Stalinism, Maoism and Trotskyism. Libertarian Marxism is also critical of reformist positions, such as those held by social democrats. Libertarian Marxist currents often draw from Marx and Engels' later works, specifically the Grundrisse and The Civil War in France, emphasizing the Marxist belief in the ability of the working class to forge its own destiny without the need for a revolutionary party or state to mediate or aid its liberation. Along with anarchism, libertarian Marxism is one of the main currents of libertarian socialism.

Libertarian Marxism includes such currents as autonomism, council communism, left communism, Lettrism, Luxemburgism, the Johnson-Forest tendency, the New Left, Situationism, Socialisme ou Barbarie, world socialism and workerism.

== Western Marxism ==
Western Marxism is a current of Marxist theory that arose from Western and Central Europe in the aftermath of the 1917 October Revolution in Russia and the ascent of Leninism. The term denotes a loose collection of Marxist theorists who emphasised culture, philosophy, and art, in contrast to the Marxism of the Soviet Union.

=== Key Western Marxists ===
==== Georg Lukács ====
Georg Lukács (13 April 1885 – 4 June 1971) was a Hungarian Marxist philosopher and literary critic, who founded Western Marxism with his magnum opus History and Class Consciousness. Written between 1919 and 1922 and first published in 1923, the collection of essays contributed to debates concerning Marxism and its relation to sociology, politics and philosophy. The book also reconstructed aspects of Marx's theory of alienation before the publication of the Economic and Philosophical Manuscripts of 1844, in which Marx most clearly expounds the theory. Lukács's work underlines Marxism's origins in Hegelianism and elaborates Marxist theories such as ideology, false consciousness, reification and class consciousness.

==== Karl Korsch ====
Karl Korsch (15 August 1886 – 21 October 1961) was born in Tostedt, near Hamburg, to the family of a middle-ranking bank official. His masterwork Marxism and Philosophy, which attempts to re-establish the historic character of Marxism as the heir to Georg Wilhelm Friedrich Hegel, earned him condemnation from the Third International. Korsch was especially concerned that Marxist theory was losing its precision and validity—in the words of the day, becoming "vulgarized"—within the upper echelons of the various socialist organizations.

In his later work, he rejected Orthodox Marxism as historically outmoded, wanting to adapt Marxism to a new historical situation. He wrote in his Ten Theses (1950) that "the first step in re-establishing a revolutionary theory and practice consists in breaking with that Marxism which claims to monopolize revolutionary initiative as well as theoretical and practical direction" and that "today, all attempts to re-establish the Marxist doctrine as a whole in its original function as a theory of the working classes social revolution are reactionary utopias".

==== Herbert Marcuse ====
Herbert Marcuse (19 July 1898 – 29 July 1979) was a prominent German-American philosopher and sociologist of Jewish descent and a member of the Frankfurt School.

Marcuse's critiques of capitalist society (especially his 1955 synthesis of Marx and Freud, Eros and Civilization and his 1964 book One-Dimensional Man) resonated with the concerns of the leftist student movement in the 1960s. Because of his willingness to speak at student protests, Marcuse soon became known as "the father of the New Left", a term he disliked and rejected.

==== Jean-Paul Sartre ====
Jean-Paul Sartre (21 June 1905 – 15 April 1980) was already a key and influential philosopher and playwright for his early writings on individualistic existentialism. In his later career, Sartre attempted to reconcile the existential philosophy of Søren Kierkegaard with Marxist philosophy and Hegelian dialectics in his work Critique of Dialectical Reason. Sartre was also involved in Marxist politics and was impressed upon visiting Marxist revolutionary Che Guevara, calling him "not only an intellectual but also the most complete human being of our age".

==== Louis Althusser ====
Louis Althusser (16 October 1918 – 22 October 1990) was a Marxist philosopher. He was a longtime member and sometimes strong critic of the French Communist Party. His arguments and theses were set against the threats that he saw attacking the theoretical foundations of Marxism. These included both the influence of empiricism on Marxist theory and humanism and reformist socialist orientations which manifested as divisions in the European Communist parties as well as the problem of the cult of personality and of ideology itself. Althusser is commonly referred to as a structural Marxist, although his relationship to other schools of French structuralism is not a simple affiliation and he is critical of many aspects of structuralism.

His essay Marxism and Humanism is a strong statement of anti-humanism in Marxist theory, condemning ideas like "human potential" and "species-being", which are often put forth by Marxists, as outgrowths of a bourgeois ideology of "humanity". His essay Contradiction and Overdetermination borrows the concept of overdetermination from psychoanalysis to replace the idea of "contradiction" with a more complex model of multiple causality in political situations (an idea closely related to Gramsci's concept of hegemony).

Althusser is also widely known as a theorist of ideology and his best-known essay is Ideology and Ideological State Apparatuses: Notes Toward an Investigation. The essay establishes the concept of ideology, also based on Gramsci's theory of hegemony. Whereas hegemony is ultimately determined entirely by political forces, ideology draws on Sigmund Freud's and Jacques Lacan's concepts of the unconscious and mirror-phase respectively and describes the structures and systems that allow us to meaningfully have a concept of the self.

=== Instrumental Marxism ===
Instrumental Marxism, also "elite analysis" or "elite model", is a theory which reasons that policy makers in government and positions of power tend to "share a common business or class background, and that their decisions will reflect their business or class interests". It perceives the role of the state as more personal than impersonal, where actions such as nepotism and favoritism are common among those in power, and as a result of this, the shared backgrounds between the economic elite and the state elite are discernible.

=== Structural Marxism ===
Instrumental Marxism is contrasted with structural Marxism, which views the class background of policymakers and so on as purely incidental to the "bourgeois" nature of the modern state, which is seen instead as a result of the position of the state and law in the objective structure of capitalist society and their objective (i.e. consciousness-independent) function of reproducing the relations of production and private property regardless of the class background of the individuals involved in the administration thereof. For example, whereas for instrumentalist Marxists the formal equality of contract law in capitalist societies is a kind of ideological shell or mystification used by the elite to conceal the real kernel of exploitation, for structural Marxists that formal legal equality is itself the real normative basis for properly capitalist exploitation, whether or not elites understand it as such as it allows labour-power to be traded at its real exchange-value (though not the value of its product), thus making regularity and rational allocation in labour markets possible. However, Miliband acknowledges that "there are ‘structural constraints which no government, whatever its complexion, wishes, and promises, can ignore or evade."

=== Neo-Marxism ===
Neo-Marxism is a school of Marxism that began in the 20th century and hearkened back to the early writings of Marx before the influence of Friedrich Engels, which focused on dialectical idealism rather than dialectical materialism. It thus rejected economic determinism, being instead far more libertarian. Neo-Marxism adds Max Weber's broader understanding of social inequality, such as status and power, to orthodox Marxist thought.

=== Frankfurt School ===
The Frankfurt School is a school of neo-Marxist social theory, social research and philosophy. The grouping emerged at the Institute for Social Research (Institut für Sozialforschung) of the University of Frankfurt am Main in Germany. The term "Frankfurt School" is an informal term used to designate the thinkers affiliated with the Institute for Social Research or influenced by them—it is not the title of any institution and the main thinkers of the Frankfurt School did not use the term to refer to themselves.

The Frankfurt School gathered together dissident Marxists, severe critics of capitalism who believed that some of Marx's alleged followers had come to parrot a narrow selection of Marx's ideas, usually in defense of orthodox communist or social democratic parties. Influenced especially by the failure of working-class revolutions in Western Europe after World War I and by the rise of Nazism in an economically, technologically and culturally advanced nation (Germany), they took up the task of choosing what parts of Marx's thought might serve to clarify social conditions which Marx himself had never seen. They drew on other schools of thought to fill in Marx's perceived omissions.

Max Weber exerted a major influence, as did Sigmund Freud (as in Herbert Marcuse's Freudo-Marxist synthesis in the 1954 work Eros and Civilization). Their emphasis on the "critical" component of theory was derived significantly from their attempt to overcome the limits of positivism, crude materialism and phenomenology by returning to Immanuel Kant's critical philosophy and its successors in German idealism, principally Hegel's philosophy, with its emphasis on negation and contradiction as inherent properties of reality.

== Marxist feminism ==
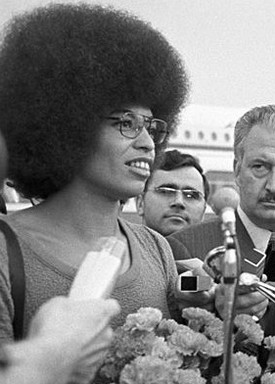
Angela Davis, a well known Marxist feminist on her 1972 visit to Moscow

Marxist feminism is a philosophical variant of feminism that incorporates and extends Marxist theory, focusing on the dismantling of capitalism as a way to liberate women. Marxist feminism analyzes the ways in which women are exploited through capitalism and the individual ownership of private property, stating that these give rise to economic inequality as well as dependence, political confusion and ultimately unhealthy social relations between men and women, which are the root of women's oppression. According to Marxist feminists, women's liberation can only be achieved by dismantling the capitalist systems in which they contend much of women's labor is uncompensated. Marxist feminists extend traditional Marxist analysis by applying it to unpaid domestic labor and sex relations.

According to Marxist theory, in capitalist societies the individual is shaped by class relations—that is people's capacities, needs and interests are seen to be determined by the mode of production that characterises the society they inhabit. Marxist feminists see gender inequality as determined ultimately by the capitalist mode of production, with gender oppression and women's subordination seen as class oppression which is maintained (like racism) because it serves the interests of capital and the ruling class. Because of its foundation in historical materialism, Marxist feminism is similar to socialist feminism and, to a greater degree, materialist feminism. The latter two place greater emphasis on what they consider the "reductionist limitations" of Marxist theory but, as Martha E. Gimenez notes in her exploration of the differences between Marxist and materialist feminism, "clear lines of theoretical demarcation between and within these two umbrella terms are somewhat difficult to establish."

== Marxist humanism ==
Marxist humanism is an international body of thought and political action rooted in a humanist interpretation of Marx that draws heavily from his earlier writings. It is an investigation into "what human nature consists of and what sort of society would be most conducive to human thriving" from a critical perspective rooted in Marxist philosophy. Marxist humanists argue that Marx himself was concerned with investigating similar questions.

Marxist humanism was born in 1932 with the publication of Marx's Economic and Philosophic Manuscripts of 1844 and reached a degree of prominence in the 1950s and 1960s. Marxist humanists contend that there is continuity between the early philosophical writings of Marx, in which he develops his theory of alienation, and the structural description of capitalist society found in his later works such as Capital. They hold that it is necessary to grasp Marx's philosophical foundations to understand his later works properly. Marxist humanism was opposed by Louis Althusser's "antihumanism", who qualified it as a revisionist movement.

== Marxist theology ==
Although Marx was intensely critical of institutionalized religion including Christianity, some Christians have "accepted the basic premises of Marxism and attempted to reinterpret Christian faith from this perspective". Some of the resulting examples are some forms of liberation theology and black theology. Pope Benedict XVI strongly opposed radical liberation theology while he was still a cardinal, with the Vatican condemning acceptance of Marxism. Black theologian James H. Cone wrote in his book For My People that "for analyzing the structure of capitalism. Marxism as a tool of social analysis can disclose the gap between appearance and reality, and thereby help Christians to see how things really are".

== Autonomist Marxism ==
Autonomism is a category of Marxist social movements around the world that emphasize the ability to organize in autonomous and horizontal networks, as opposed to hierarchical structures such as unions or parties. Early autonomist theorists such as Antonio Negri, as well as Mario Tronti, Paolo Virno, Sergio Bologna and Franco "Bifo" Berardi, developed notions of "immaterial" and "social labour", which broaden the definition of the working-class to include salaried and unpaid labour, such as skilled professions and housework, this extended the Marxist concept of labour to all society. They suggested that modern society's wealth was produced by unaccountable collective work, which in advanced capitalist states as the primary force of change in the construct of capital, and that only a little of this was redistributed to the workers in the form of wages. Other theorists including Mariarosa Dalla Costa and Silvia Federici emphasised the importance of feminism and the value of unpaid female labour to capitalist society, adding these to the theory of Autonomism. Negri and Michael Hardt argue that network power constructs are the most effective methods of organization against the neoliberal regime of accumulation and predict a massive shift in the dynamics of capital into a 21st century empire. Harry Cleaver is an autonomist and Marxist theoretician, who authored Reading Capital Politically, an autonomist reading of Marx's Capital.

== Analytical Marxism ==
Analytical Marxism refers to a style of thinking about Marxism that was prominent among a half-dozen analytically trained English-speaking philosophers and social scientists during the 1980s. It was mainly associated with the September Group of academics, so called because they have biennial meetings in varying locations every other September to discuss common interests. The group also dubbed itself "Non-Bullshit Marxism". In the words of David Miller, it was characterized by "clear and rigorous thinking about questions that are usually blanketed by ideological fog".

== British Marxist historians ==
The British Marxist historians were a circle of scholars that originated in the Communist Party of Great Britain in the 1930s, eventually forming the Communist Party Historians Group in 1946. They shared a common interest in "history from below" and class structure in early capitalist society. Important members of the group were Maurice Dobb, Dona Torr, A. L. Morton, Rodney Hilton, E. P. Thompson, Eric Hobsbawm, George Rudé, Christopher Hill, Dorothy Thompson, John Saville, Victor Kiernan and Raphael Samuel.

While some members of the group (most notably E. P. Thompson) left the party after the Hungarian Revolution of 1956, the common points of British Marxist historiography continued in their works. They placed great emphasis on human agency, cultural experience and the subjective determination of history, while growing increasingly distant from determinist views of materialism. E. P. Thompson famously engaged Louis Althusser in The Poverty of Theory, arguing that Althusser's theory overdetermined history and left no space for historical revolt by the oppressed.

== Austro-Marxism ==
Austro-Marxism was a school of Marxist thought centered in Vienna that existed from the beginning of the 20th century until the 1930s. Its most eminent proponents were Max Adler, Otto Bauer, Rudolf Hilferding and Karl Renner. It was influenced by contemporaneous intellectual trends, including the prominence of neo-Kantianism and positivism in philosophy and the emergence of marginalism in economics. The group confronted issues such as the problem of the National Question within the Austro-Hungarian Empire, the rise of the interventionist state, and the changing class-structure of early 20th century capitalist societies.

== Orthodox Marxism ==
The philosophy of orthodox Marxism includes the understanding that material development (advances in technology in the productive forces) is the primary agent of change in the structure of society and of human social relations and that social systems and their relations (e.g. feudalism, capitalism and so on) become contradictory and inefficient as the productive forces develop, which results in some form of social revolution arising in response to the mounting contradictions. This revolutionary change is the vehicle for fundamental society-wide changes and ultimately leads to the emergence of new economic systems.

In the term orthodox Marxism, the word "orthodox" refers to the methods of historical materialism and of dialectical materialism—and not the normative aspects inherent to classical Marxism, without implying dogmatic adherence to the results of Marx's investigations.

== Praxis School ==
The Praxis school was a dissident Marxist humanist philosophical movement, whose members were influenced by Western Marxism. It originated in Zagreb and Belgrade in the SFR Yugoslavia, during the 1960s.

Prominent figures among the school's founders include Gajo Petrović and Milan Kangrga of Zagreb and Mihailo Marković of Belgrade. From 1964 to 1974 they published the Marxist journal Praxis, which was renowned as one of the leading international journals in Marxist theory. The group also organized the widely popular Korčula Summer School in the island of Korčula.

== De Leonism ==
De Leonism is a form of syndicalist Marxism developed by Daniel De Leon. De Leon was an early leader within the first United States socialist political party, the Socialist Labor Party of America which exists to the present day.

De Leonism lies outside the Leninist tradition of communism. The highly decentralized and democratic nature of the proposed De Leonist government is in contrast to the democratic centralism of Marxism–Leninism and what they see as the dictatorial nature of the Soviet Union. The success of the De Leonist plan depends on achieving majority support among the people both in the workplaces and at the polls, in contrast to the Leninist notion that a small vanguard party should lead the working class to carry out the revolution. De Leon and other De Leonist writers have issued frequent polemics against democratic socialist movements—especially the Socialist Party of America—and consider them to be reformist or bourgeois socialist.

De Leonists have traditionally refrained from any activity or alliances viewed by them as trying to reform capitalism, though the Socialist Labor Party in De Leon's time was active during strikes and such, like social justice movements.

== Eurocommunism ==
Beginning around the 1970s, various communist parties in Western Europe such as the Italian Communist Party under Enrico Berlinguer and the Communist Party of Spain under Santiago Carrillo tried to hew to a more independent line from Moscow. Particularly in Italy, they leaned on the theories of Antonio Gramsci. This trend went by the name Eurocommunism was especially prominent in Italy, Spain and France.

== Post-Marxism ==
Post-Marxism represents the theoretical work of philosophers and social theorists who have built their theories upon those of Marx and Marxists, but exceeded the limits of those theories in ways that puts them outside of Marxism. It begins with the basic tenets of Marxism, but moves away from the mode of production as the starting point for analysis and includes factors other than class, such as gender, ethnicity etc. and a reflexive relationship between the base and superstructure.

Marxism remains a powerful theory in some unexpected and relatively obscure places and is not always properly labeled as "Marxism". For example, many Mexican and some American archaeologists still employ a Marxist model to explain the Classic Maya collapse (c. 900 A.D.) – without mentioning Marxism by name.

== See also ==
- Anarchist schools of thought
- List of communist ideologies

== Sources ==
- Gerber, John (1989). Anton Pannekoek and the Socialism of Workers' Self-Emancipation, 1873–1960. Dordrecht: Kluwer. ISBN 978-0792302742.
- Shipway, Mark (1987). "Council Communism". In Rubel, Maximilien; Crump, John (eds.). Non-Market Socialism in the Nineteenth and Twentieth Centuries. New York: St. Martin's Press. pp. 104–126.
