= Edgell Rickword =

English poet, critic, journalist and literary editor

- Born: 22 October 1898; Colchester, Essex, England
- Died: 15 March 1982 (aged 83)
- Education: Colchester Royal Grammar School, Pembroke College, Oxford
- Known for: Poetry, communist activism
- Political party: Communist Party of Great Britain (CPGB)
- Awards: Military Cross

John Edgell Rickword, MC (22 October 1898 – 15 March 1982) was an English poet, critic, journalist and literary editor. He became one of the leading communist intellectuals active in the 1930s.

== Early life ==
Rickword was born in Colchester, Essex, the fifth and last child of George Rickword, borough librarian, and his wife Mabel, née Prosser. After a dame school, he attended the local grammar school. He served in the British Army in World War I, having joined the Artists' Rifles in 1916, before being commissioned as a temporary second lieutenant in the Royal Berkshire Regiment in October 1917. Almost exactly a year later, he was awarded the Military Cross (MC), the citation for which reads:

For conspicuous gallantry and initiative near Dourges on 15th October, 1918. He volunteered to cross the Haute Deule Canal and make a reconnaissance. After crossing the canal at Pont-a-Sault, his presence was discovered by the enemy, who kept him covered with their machine guns. In spite of this he worked his way along the western bank of the canal, and brought back most valuable information, which enabled his company to form a bridgehead.

He was a published war poet, and collected his early verse in Behind the Eyes (1921).

On 4 January 1919, Rickword developed an illness that was diagnosed as a "general vascular invasion which had resulted in general septicaemia". His left eye was so badly infected that they thought it necessary to remove it to prevent the infection from spreading to the other eye.

He went up to Pembroke College, Oxford in 1919, staying only four terms reading French literature, and leaving when he married. Literary friends from this period included mainly other ex-soldiers: Anthony Bertram, Edmund Blunden, Vivian de Sola Pinto, A. E. Coppard, Louis Golding, Robert Graves, L. P. Hartley and Alan Porter. His work appeared in the Oxford Poetry 1921 anthology, with Blunden, Golding, Porter, Graves, Richard Hughes and Frank Prewett.

== Critic ==
He then took up literary work in London. He reviewed for The Times Literary Supplement, which led to a celebrated review of T. S. Eliot's The Waste Land. J. C. Squire published him in the London Mercury, and Desmond MacCarthy as literary editor of the New Statesman gave him work.

He started The Calendar of Modern Letters literary review, now highly regarded, in March 1925. It lasted until July 1927, assisted by Douglas Garman and then Bertram Higgins, and contributions from his cousin C. H. Rickword. The Scrutinies books of collected pieces from it were a succes d'estime; the purpose of the publication was a mass killing of the sacred cows of Edwardian literature (G. K. Chesterton, John Galsworthy, John Masefield, George Bernard Shaw, H. G. Wells). Its undoubted influence as a precursor of later criticism was very marked in the early days of Scrutiny, the magazine founded a few years later by F. R. Leavis and Q. D. Leavis. Rickword also wrote for that publication.

== Communist ==
He joined the Communist Party of Great Britain in 1934, and became increasingly active in political work during the period of the Spanish Civil War; while still writing poetry. He was friendly with Randall Swingler, the 'official' poetry voice of the CPGB, and with Jack Lindsay, his only real rival as a theoretician. He was closely connected with the leading cultural figures on the hard Left, such as Mulk Raj Anand, Ralph Winston Fox, Julius Lipton, A. L. Morton, Sylvia Townsend Warner and Alick West. When Lawrence & Wishart was created as the official CPGB publishing house, in 1936, Rickword became a director. It was through Rickword that Lawrence & Wishart published Nancy Cunard's Negro: An Anthology, though at her own expense.

At that same period he was a co-founder of the Left Review, which he edited. His associates included James Boswell, who was the art editor; they had met around 1929. Left Review existed from 1934 to 1938, was set up by Rickword and Douglas Garman, had as writers both CPGB members and notable figures outside the party, and founded Marxist criticism in the UK.

Later he became editor of Our Time, the Communist review, from 1944 to 1947, working with Arnold Rattenbury and David Holbrook. Rickword had an upbeat view at the time on the possibilities of popular culture and radical politics, and the circulation rose as he broadened the publication's scope from popular political poetry. The post-war clique around Our Time, the Salisbury Group (named for a pub), included Christopher Hill, Charles Hobday, Holbrook, Mervyn Jones, Lindsay, Rattenbury, Montagu Slater, Swingler, E. P. Thompson; and Doris Lessing joined it.

In 1949, writing a preface to Christopher Caudwell's Further Studies in a Dying Culture, Rickword stated that themes of Caudwell's essay is "the unity of thinking and doing, the nullity of either in isolation." Further, Rickword wrote that Caudwell here "reminds us that poetry and art were as essential to his sense of fitness as bread and air."

== Works ==
- Behind the Eyes (1921) poems
- Rimbaud: The Boy and the Poet (1924)
- Invocation to Angels (1928) poems
- Scrutinies By Various Writers (1928) editor
- Scrutinies Volume II (1931) editor
- Love One Another (1929) Mandrake Press
- Poet Under Saturn. The Tragedy of Verlaine by Marcel Coulon (1932) translator
- A Handbook of Freedom: A Record of English Democracy Through Twelve Centuries (1939) Co-editor with Jack Lindsay
- Collected Poems (1947)
- Radical Squibs and Loyal Ripostes: A Collection of Satirical Pamphlets of the Regency Period 1819-1821 (1971) editor
- Essays and Opinions, vol. 1: 1921-1931 (1974) edited by Alan Young
- Literature and Society. Essays and Opinions, vol.2: 1931-1978 (1978)
- Twittingpan and Some Others (1981) poems
- Fifty Poems, a selection by Edgell Rickword, with introduction by Roy Fuller
