= Victims' rights =

Legal rights afforded to victims of crime

Victims' rights are generally defined as legal entitlements afforded to victims of crime. They vary according to the legal jurisdiction within which they are applied and are dependent on several variants including societal, cultural, political, socio-economic and geographical. Victims's rights belong to the public law sphere, and relate to criminal justice proceedings, constitutional law and restorative justice. Victims' rights must be aligned with international human rights law and in particular the Universal Declaration of Human Rights.

Examples include the right to restitution, the right to a victims' advocate, and the right not to be excluded from criminal justice proceedings. A key principle underlying victims' rights is the need to avoid secondary victimisation in their implementation particularly when victims' are called to take a role in criminal justice proceedings.

== United States ==
=== History ===
During the colonial and revolutionary periods, the United States criminal justice system was victim-centric, in that crimes were often investigated and prosecuted by individual victims. In the 19th and early 20th centuries, however, the role of the victim in criminal proceedings was reduced, owing to shifts in attitudes in the way crimes were perceived; the criminal justice system became seen as a tool to remedy social harms rather than an avenue to redress personal harm.

The modern crime victims' rights movement began in the 1970s, in part as a response to the 1973 U.S. Supreme Court decision Linda R.S. v. Richard D. (410 U.S. 614). In Linda R.S., the court ruled that the complainant did not have the legal standing to keep the prosecutors' office from discriminately applying a statute criminalizing non-payment of child support. In dicta, the court articulated the then-prevailing view that a private crime victims have no jurisdiction in deciding the process of a criminal prosecution. This ruling served as a high-water mark in the shift away from the victim-centric approach to criminal justice, relegating the role of victims in the criminal trial to being evidence for the prosecution.

The Linda R.S. ruling, notwithstanding, stated that Congress could create legislation that safeguards victims' rights and provides standing to victims where they would otherwise not have any. At the same time, social consciousness about victims' rights surged. Supporters of the law and order, civil rights, and feminist movement challenged conventional views of the criminal justice system on the role of the victim. By providing educational resources and legal assistance and establishing the country's first hotlines and shelters for victims of crime, much of the movements' work later became the grassroots foundation of the modern victims' rights movement.

In 1982, President Ronald Reagan's Task Force on Victims of Crime released its final report which detailed the concerns of victims' rights advocates, stating that "innocent victims of crime have been overlooked, their pleas for justice have gone unheeded, and their wounds — personal, emotional, financial — have gone unattended". The report contained 68 recommendations for service providers and government officials, many of which are mandated through victims' rights legislation today, as well as a recommendation for a victims' rights amendment to the U.S. Constitution.

In the decades that followed, proponents of victims' rights experienced substantial legislative success. Today, the victims' rights movement continues to increase access to procedural mechanisms for victims to enforce their rights and promote legislation that guarantees those substantive rights. Modern victims' rights organizations include the National Alliance of Victims' Rights Attorneys, National Organization for Victim Assistance, and the National Center for Victims of Crime.

=== Victims' rights legislation ===
Since 1982, thirty-three states have amended their constitutions to address victims' rights, and all states have passed victims' rights legislation. That same year, Congress passed the first piece of federal crime victims' rights legislation, the Victim and Witness Protection Act. In 1984, the Victims of Crime Act was passed. A decade later, in 1994, the Violence Against Women Act became law. In 2004, the landmark Crime Victims' Rights Act was passed, granting crime victims eight specific rights, and providing standing for individual victims to assert those rights in court.

=== Federal law ===
==== Victims of Crime Act (VOCA) ====
VOCA established the Crime Victims Fund, which awards grants to crime victim compensation programs, Victim Notification Systems, and victim assistance programs. The fund is financed by offender fees.

==== Crime Victims' Rights Act of 2004 ====
The Crime Victims' Rights Act, part of the Justice for All Act of 2004, enumerates the rights afforded to victims in federal criminal cases. The Act grants victims the following rights:

1. Protection from the accused,
2. Notification,
3. Not to be excluded from proceedings,
4. Speaking at criminal justice proceedings,
5. Consultation with the prosecuting attorney,
6. Restitution,
7. Proceedings free from unreasonable delay,
8. Fair treatment, and respect for the victims' dignity and privacy

=== State law ===
All states have passed legislation that protects the rights of victims of crime, and most have passed constitutional amendments that afford protection to crime victims. Some state laws apply to only victims of felony offenses, while other states also extend rights to victims of less serious misdemeanor offenses. When a victim is a minor, disabled, or deceased, some states permit family members to exercise rights on behalf of the victim.

Common state law protections include the rights to:

- Treatment with dignity and respect,
- Information about the prosecution, plea offers, court proceedings, and sentencing,
- Make a statement in court at the time of sentencing,
- Protection,
- Seek compensation from a state victim's rights fund,
- Restitution from the offender,
- Return of personal property, and
- Information about parole proceedings or release from incarceration, and to make a statement to the parole board,
- Enforcement of victim's rights.

Many prosecuting attorneys' offices have a victim's rights officer or multiple employees who assist victims of crime during and after a prosecution.

=== Criticism ===
In 2008, Human Rights Watch published a report comparing United States victims' rights laws to international human rights standards, which found that "while U.S. Jurisdictions, both federal and state, have made significant progress in recent decades, much more can be done to ensure that victims' rights and legitimate interests are upheld." The report states that the U.S. should use the UN's Basic Principles as a guide to inform their laws and policies. In addition, it recommends that the U.S. adopt policies that define "victim" arbitrarily; expand access to victim services and compensation; and "maintain and enforce standards for the collection and preservation of evidence, particularly rape kit evidence." The report also recommends U.S. ratification of the CEDAW and CRC.

== Canada ==
=== History ===
Public discussions about victims’ rights in Canada began at the end of the 20th century. Before this, victims of crime were primarily considered witnesses in criminal proceedings although they did receive some recognition through provincial victim compensation programs which began in the late 1960s. There was a significant increase in the attention to victims’ rights beginning in the 1980s. A combination of factors have been put forward to explain this change including international law, the women's movement, a fearful conception of crime in the public, advocacy for victim and witness services, as well as criminal justice officials bringing awareness to the situation of victims. Feminists in the women's movement had a particular impact on how law reform was shaped regarding the treatment of victims and survivors of sexual violence in the criminal justice system. However, many feminists within this movement were critical of politics that fixated on punishment. They maintained a focus on the systemic nature of sexual violence which differentiated them from those focused on victimization as an individualized issue.

The Canadian Government began to discuss victims of crime more seriously with the abolishment of the death penalty and the introduction of the Peace and Security Package in 1976. They carried out studies on victimization as part of this package which were used to gain a greater understanding of the reality of crime. The first large scale victimization survey was administered by Statistics Canada in 1982 and similar surveys took place again in 1988 and 1993. The Canadian Federal-Provincial Task Force on Justice for Victims of Crime was established in 1981, to further look at the needs of victims, to address a variety of victim related issues such as funding and legislation and finally to make recommendations. They delivered their final report in 1983 which also took into consideration the results of the first victimization survey from 1982.

At the international level, Canada signed on to the United Nations Declaration of Basic Principles of Justice for Victims of Crimes and Abuse of Power (UN Declaration) in 1985 but they did not enact legislation giving victims formal rights at that time. However, at the provincial level, Manitoba became the first province to legislate victims’ rights in their 1986 Justice for Victims of Crimes Act. Other provinces followed suit and similarly enacted victim focused legislation.

In 1988, the Canadian Government followed numerous recommendations made in the 1983 Task Force Report and amended the Criminal Code. In this amendment, there were major changes such as new provisions on victim impact statements and victim surcharges. Together in the same year, the Canadian Statement of Basic Principles of Justice for Victims of Crime was released and supported by federal, provincial and territorial governments. This statement was revised in 2003 and in the time between these two statements, in 1992, victims gained rights at the federal level for the first time as they were legislated into the Corrections and Conditional Release Act allowing victims the right to certain information about the offender.

Legal reforms continued to occur in the 1990s and early 2000s which further recognized victims and incrementally changed their role in the justice system. In 2000 a federal Victims of Crime Initiative was set eventually creating a Victims Fund and other financial supports contributing "to provincial and territorial governments and non-governmental organizations to develop, promote and enhance services and assistance for victims". In 2007 this was later renamed the Federal Victims Strategy. The year 2007 was also when the Office of the Federal Ombudsman for Victims of Crime opened (later changed to Ombudsperson), which was made in part to work outside of the Government overseeing complaints about federally run victim related services.

More recently, in 2015 the Government of Canada enacted the Canadian Victims Bill of Rights. Part of this legislation was a mandated five-year review which was not conducted in 2020. The Office of the Federal Ombudsperson for Victims of Crime on the other hand released a progress report in 2020 that raised multiple concerns including that these rights are legally unenforceable. The Federal Ombudsperson and the Canadian Resource Centre for Victims of Crime urged the Government of Canada to complete this review. The review process started in early 2022 and a report from the review was completed at the end of that year. The Government of Canada provided their response in 2023 where they acknowledged some of the recommendations that were made. The Office of the Federal Ombudsperson for Victims of Crime provided an official detailed response to the report from the review in 2024.

=== Victims' Rights Legislation ===
Criminal law is decided at the federal level in Canada and is administered primarily provincially. The Criminal Code and the Correctional and Conditional Release Act are the two main pieces of criminal law that lay out the role of victims in the Canadian criminal justice system. In 2015 The Victims Bill of Rights Act (Bill C-32) created the Canadian Victims Bill of Rights and amended other legislation to align with these rights. Since the first provincial Victims Bill of Rights in Manitoba, every province and territory has instated some type of law that addresses victims of crime although they vary.

=== Federal Law and Policy ===
==== Canadian Statement of Basic Principles of Justice for Victims of Crime (Canadian Statement) ====
The 1988 Canadian Statement was made to acknowledge the UN Declaration. The Canadian Statement was recognized by federal, provincial and territorial government officials responsible for criminal justice matters and many of the principles used in it were based on those in the UN Declaration. The Canadian Statement was updated in 2003 and existed to provide principles to "guide the development of policies, programs and legislation related to victims of crime" as well as "guide the treatment of victims, particularly during the criminal justice process." It provides ten enumerated principles focused on fair treatment and includes for example the consideration of the victim's views and privacy as well as what information should be given to victims. The Canadian Statement is in principle only and did not give victims’ new legal rights because there was no explicit enforcement mechanism listed within it.

==== Canadian Victims' Bill of Rights (CVBR) ====
The CVBR begins with a preamble that is in part taken from the earlier Canadian Statement on justice for victims of crime in 1988 and 2003. The preamble in the CVBR contains the sentence which says "Whereas victims of crime and their families deserve to be treated with courtesy, compassion and respect, including respect for their dignity" which resembles the first principle of the Canadian Statement.

The four main types of victims’ rights that are listed in the CVBR are:

1. Information
2. Protection
3. Participation
4. Restitution

Importantly, the last part of the CVBR titled "Remedies" includes sections 25 through 29 which deal with complaints, status, no cause of action and no appeal respectively. This section additionally gives victims the right to complain if the complaint is about a federal agency. Sections 27 to 29 specifically "deny victims any standing to appeal to courts for review when their rights are not upheld" and thus these rights are not enforceable.

=== Provincial and Territorial Law and Policy ===
Some provinces in Canada adopted victim related legislation and responded to the UN Declaration before the federal government. Although all provinces and territories have now instated laws addressing victims, these rights have also been found to be unenforceable. Manitoba’s Victim's Bill of Rights however does contain some provisions unlike other provinces where complaint mechanisms are specific and allow for a clearer process for victims to follow should they wish to file one. They also give direction as to who is in charge of providing information to victims.

== European Union ==
The key statute outlining and protecting victims' rights in the European Union (EU) is Directive 2012/29/EU of the European Parliament and of the Council of 25 October 2012 establishing minimum standards on the rights, support and protection of victims of crime (Victims' Directive). This replaced the Council Framework Decision 2001/220/JHA, and strengthened the rights of victims in the EU independently of their nationality. The Directive recognised that there were concerns about freedom of movement in the EU and its impact on victims of crimes, and recommended the strengthening of victims' rights as a remedy. The Directive requires that victims are recognised and treated with respect and dignity, are protected from further victimisation from the offender or within criminal proceedings, and receive appropriate support and have access to compensation. The Victims' Directive forms part of the EU Strategy on victims' rights (2020–2025), and the commission's commitment to promote victims' rights. Both the Victims' Directive and the Strategy itself acknowledge that victims can be anyone who has been harmed without the need for this harm to have been prosecuted. This opened the way for alternative dispute resolution processes including restorative justice. According to Gavrielides, within the Victims Directive, restorative justice is regulated so that its provision is compliant with victims' rights.

Moreover, the European Commission has stated that all victims will be individually assessed to identify vulnerability. In particular, young victims are always presumed vulnerable, with other categories of persons such as victims of terrorism, organized crime, human trafficking, gender-based violence, sexual violence and exploitation, as well as victims with disabilities, being noted as having an increase of vulnerability.

In addition, the Stockholm Programme entitles all victims of gender-based violence, domestic violence, and terrorism to the same protections as victims of crime, as these kinds of victims are deemed to be particularly vulnerable and in need of special support and protection by the state, regardless of their nationality.

=== Austria ===
Austria has established protections for victims of crime that reside in the EEA area as well as Austrian citizens and permanent residents. Victim services include free access to legal advice and representation, counselling and monetary compensation for victims of criminal acts that result in at least six months' imprisonment. The compensation is funded by fines imposed on convicted offenders, among other sources.

Although Austria is a signatory to the Victims of Crime Directive, it has not been wholly compliant. One breach of the directive is that the victims must largely communicate in English or German with officials, which may hinder the rights of victims without the help of a consulate. Another breach involves a number of benefits afforded only to Austrian citizens, including compensation if a citizen is a victim of crime even the injury is suffered in another country. Additionally, non-EEA nationals are not entitled to as much state support and must ordinarily instead rely on the donation-sponsored Weissering, which additionally takes on cases at discretion and after means testing.

=== Bulgaria ===
Bulgaria's attempts to protect and support the rights of victims of crime are generally considered superficial. Victims are entitled to participate in criminal trials as witnesses, private accusers or complainants, with assistance from legal counsel. Additionally, legislation provides for protection of vulnerable witnesses (e.g. children, victims of sexual offences) during witness examination and police questioning. A recent International Crime Victims Survey revealed that only 40% of victims in the nation are satisfied with the way police handled their matters.

A committee report on the Convention on the Elimination of All Forms of Discrimination Against Women highlighted a number of breaches of the convention by the state, being critical of Bulgaria's failure to provide for adequate compensation for victims of sexual offences and reliance on gender stereotypes when drafting legislation. Bulgaria's rape laws have also been controversial in their treatment of victims. In M.C. v Bulgaria, the ECJ held that the decision not to prosecute the rape of a 14-year-old rape victim, under a law that prescribed that rapes would only be prosecuted where there was evidence of physical force and active resistance, breached her rights provided under Articles 3 and 8. The court had held that rape laws must apply to all forms of non-consensual sexual acts.

A recent committee of the Council of Europe Convention on Action Against Trafficking in Human Beings found that no adult victims of human trafficking received any form of assistance from the Bulgarian Government.

=== Croatia ===
The rights of victims of crimes in Croatia have been improving steadily since Croatia became a candidate for the European Union in 2004. Croatia, in order to fulfil prerequisites for joining the EU, initiated changes in their criminal justice system in relation to the rights of victims. One change instigated by the government was in the form of the Department for Support to Witnesses and Other Participants in War Crimes Trials (2005). At a legislative level, the Criminal Procedure Act (2008) increased the rights of victims and recognised victims as a separate entity in court in addition to their role as a witness and injured party. These rights include the right to psychological support and to compensation. The Crime Victims Compensation Act (2008) allowed Croatian citizens to receive compensation if they experienced serious personal injury.

In 2015, Croatia's parliament adopted laws awarding victims of rape committed during the 1991–1995 Independence War compensation as well as free access to therapeutic, medical, and legal services.

=== Cyprus ===
Cyprus awards compensation to victims of violence that cases serious bodily harm or death under European Convention on the Compensation of Victims of Violent Crimes. As a member of the European Union, Cyprus has aligned its domestic legislation with the Victims Directive and its definition of "victims". One of the biggest and longest standing issue in relation to victims' compensation in Cyprus relates to Turkey's invasion in 1974 and the missing persons. The International Commission on Missing Persons has been working with the Cyprus government to address this issue but several attempts have failed. There are a number of victims rights NGOs and charities promoting and protecting victims including those of domestic violence, war, terrorism, hate crime and gender based violence. The Association for the Prevention of Violence in the Family and the Restorative Justice for All International Institute are some examples of NGOs.

=== Denmark ===
Victims' rights in Denmark are largely implemented through domestic legislation and not international law. Denmark is not a signatory to any of the European Union's directives on victims' rights, being the only member state which is not required to sign or implement Directive 2012/29/EU.

Notwithstanding, Denmark still maintains a relatively high standard for victims' rights through its domestic legislation, providing compensation for victims of crimes with serious injuries to all of its citizens as well as foreign citizens living in Denmark. Compensation is also given to dependents of homicide victims. Compensation awarded for medical expenses and loss of income is additionally unlimited. Danish police are required by law to accept any criminal report irrespective of the language used.

Other support services for victims of crime within Denmark include discretionary free legal aid for violent crimes and automatic free legal aid for victims of sexual assault. In addition, every victim has the right to an interpreter and free translation of legal documents. Victim support services are accessible to residents even where no crime has been reported and no criminal proceedings undertaken. Where mediation has occurred between an offender and the victim, with the offender apologising to and reconciling with the victim, the court may apply a lesser sentence for the sake of providing the victim empowerment and closure. Victims may also police decisions not to prosecute to a regional prosecutor, whose decision may be further appealed to the director of public prosecutions.

=== Estonia ===
In Estonia, only 43% of victims of serious crimes made a police report, with only 17% of complainants saying they were satisfied with the treatment by the police. In 2002, the NGO Estonian Crime Victim Support Society released a document that led a debate about legislation dealing with victim support issues. This ultimately cumulated in the Victim Support Act of 2003, which marked a shift in the Estonian criminal justice system from retributive justice to restorative justice. Consequently, the Estonian government began to place more emphasis on providing practical and material help for victims of crime. Nonetheless, state victim support only deals with certain types of offences, with many victims uncomfortable participating.

Victims of serious violent crimes, as well as their dependents, in Estonia are entitled to state compensation under the Victim Support Act. Such compensation has a cap and includes loss of income, damages due to death, funeral expenses, among other damages.

=== France ===
France is a signatory to the EU's Victims of Crime Directive and had until November 2015 to implement it. As of February 2016, it had failed to notify the EU what policies it had implemented.

Victims of crimes in France have the right to be involved in the trial and access legal counsel. They are also entitled to compensation, with police being obligated to inform victims of their right to compensation under the Framework Justice Act (2002). Police can also register compensation claims on behalf of victims so there is no need to go to court. A state fund for compensation for victims of violent crimes exists called The State Fund for the Victims of Crime. This is partly funded by funds from perpetrators.

The French Department of Justice partially funds the National Victim Support and Mediation Institute, which provides assistance to victims and advocates for victims' rights. The organisation has pushed for the French government to implement the directive, providing recommendations based on their assessment of victims' needs.

In 2012, France was found to have violated Article 4 of the European Convention of Human Rights due to its failure to provide an adequate framework to protect the rights of human trafficking victims. As of 2013, the French government was found to be in full compliance with the required minimum standards for the elimination of trafficking.

=== Germany ===
The German Code of Criminal Procedure 1987 gives victims a number of rights, including rights of participation in trial, of appeal, and of compensation for loss. Unlike in many other jurisdictions, victims of crime in Germany may participate in the criminal proceedings against the accused. For victims of certain personal offences, such as defamation, bodily injury, and property damage, victims are automatically entitled to engage a private prosecutor who will represent their interests at trial. Victims also have the right to engage a legal representative to uphold their interests when, for example, they are being questioned as a witness.

Private prosecutors cannot appeal decisions on account of the leniency of a sentence.

=== Greece ===
Victims of crimes in Greece may be afforded additional rights, support and protection in specific situations, including sexual abuse instances and where the victim is a minor. There is no discrimination by support services against foreigners. Foreign victims are entitled to an interpreter when testifying to the police.

Greece has been criticised for its lack of upholding minority victims rights in regards to hate crimes. To file a complaint for a hate crime, the current law requires the payment of a fee, dissuading victims from reporting offences. This deficiency is exacerbated by the lack of protection for undocumented migrants experiencing hate crime. Greece has also been condemned by the European Court of Human Rights 11 times for the misuse of weapons by police and the subsequent absence of effective investigations, with migrants or members of minority groups being victims in ten of these incidents.

Greece is one of 16 countries facing infringement proceedings for non-communication of the EU Victims of Crime Directive.

For victims of domestic violence and certain other crimes such as child abuse, if the offender lacks the means to provide compensation, or if the offender remains anonymous, the state of Greece, under the Compensation Directive 2004/80/EC is obliged to provide compensation to victims of intentional crimes of violence. The compensation provided by the perpetrator or the state of Greece must cover financial losses associated with physical damage resulting from the violent crime; this includes medical fees, loss of income and funeral costs, but not psychological damage and trauma. Victims of crime in Greece have five days to report the crime; if the crime is not reported in this timeframe, victims are not eligible for compensation. The Hellenic Compensation Authority processes claims for compensation.

=== Hungary ===
Until new legislation was introduced in 2013, domestic violence was not categorized as a separate offence from other forms of assault, which meant that victims of domestic violence in Hungary were accosted the same rights as other victims of assault. According to Human Rights Watch, police in Hungary had often dismissed the injuries of victims of serious domestic violence, at times refusing to bring abusers to prosecution. In the ECtHR case Kalucza v. Hungary 2012, the applicant complained that Hungarian authorities had failed to protect her abuse from her husband in her home. The ECtHR concluded that Article 8 (providing the right to respect for private and family life) had been breached. Legislative changes made in 2013 imposed harsher penalties upon perpetrators of domestic violence and placed the onus upon the prosecution, and not the victim, to pursue legal action.

=== Italy ===
Victims rights are detained in the Code of Penal Procedure, which outlines that during prosecution and sentencing, victims have the right to be informed of judicial proceeding developments and can produce evidence at any stage of the trial. Victims also have the right to oppose a judge in their decision on a request for dismissal and may engage their own counsel if necessary. Victims who have died as a result of a crime may have their rights exercised by close relatives of the victim. Victims are entitled to compensation depending on the nature and severity of the crime. Particularly vulnerable victims may be granted free legal aid. Victims' assistance agencies may also accompany vulnerable victims at trial with their consent.

One of the most vulnerable victim groups in Italy is children under the age of 16. Some of the most prevalent challenges faced by children in Italy include child labor, forced participation in organized crime and also becoming refugees after fleeing their own nation. Child victims have certain rights explicitly stated in the Italian Penal Code; for example, a child victim of sexual exploitation is to be assisted throughout the entire criminal proceedings, and investigatory examination of a child must be undertaken by the president of questions and be assisted by a family member or child psychologist. Nonetheless, the Italian criminal justice system lacks ongoing supportive resources to protect the rights of children.

=== Lithuania ===
Lithuania has several national mechanisms relating to the rights and support for victims of crime. The Ministry of Justice, Ministry of Foreign Affairs, and the Police Department of the Ministry of the Interior each provide legal aid services and have set up protection measures for victims of crime.

Lithuania allows for the voluntary compensation of victims of crimes, which, if not done, allows the victim to bring a civil suit against the offender. If the offender cannot provide compensation for the victim, the state will provide compensation in lieu.

There are many NGOs operating within Lithuania that provide facilities and support for victims. These include the Crime Victim Care Association of Lithuania, Caritas Lithuania, the Missing Person's Support Centre, Klaipeda Social and Psychological Support Centre, the Child House, and the International Organization for Migration.

=== Latvia ===
Latvia does not have a comprehensive victim support system, and there is no indication that it intends to develop one. Despite this, the criminal procedure law of Latvia includes a specific chapter dedicated to victims, outlining the procedural rights and obligations of victims. For an individual to gain victims' rights in Latvia, four requirements must be fulfilled: the initiation of a criminal procedure, information that suggests that the offence harmed the person, consent by the victim to be recognised as such, and the recognition of the person as a victim by the person in charge of the criminal proceedings. Victims of crime in Latvia have access to legal aid, but they must pay the costs up front, with reimbursement being provided by the offender.

Latvia is a Tier 2 source and destination country persons trafficked for sexual exploitation and forced labour. To safeguard the rights of victims of trafficking, the government of Latvia has increased the accessibility of government-funded protections, including offering victims of trafficking temporary residency in exchange for participating in the judicial process against human traffickers. During this period of investigation, qualifying victims are offered government aid. Victims who do not meet the qualifying criteria are referred to non-governmental organisations for aid. Furthermore, victims who may have participated in unlawful activity as a result of their trafficking can avoid prosecution. The Latvian government also ensures the social rehabilitation of victims of human trafficking.

=== Luxembourg ===
Luxembourg has a well-developed program of victim support services through the state-run Victim Support Service (part of the Ministry of Justice). It is one of only five EU member states where the Ministry of Justice is solely responsible for the distribution of these services. The state also coordinates with non-profit organisations, including through the provision of financial support, to assist in the development of legal reforms and to better coordinate at a grassroots level. For example, one such organisation, Women in Distress, works to provide women, their children and young girls with effective protection against violence by way of refuges and information centres. Through this process, Luxembourg has become one of only nine EU member states to fulfil the Council of Europe's recommendation of one counselling centre per 50,000 women.

Victims of crime can report the crime to the police or directly to the public prosecutor. Reports must be submitted in one of Luxembourg's official languages: Luxembourgish, French and German. An interpreter is available, free of charge, for people who do not speak these languages. Statutory limitation periods for reporting apply. Victims are able to be involved in the process by acting as witnesses and providing testimony, with free interpretation services and victims being entitled to be represented by lawyers. Police must undergo a mandatory course on victimology and are obligated to inform victims of their rights to receive assistance, compensation, legal aid, and information about their proceedings. If a case does not proceed to court, reasons for this outcome must be provided in order to help the victim decide whether to appeal this decision.

Luxembourg offers compensation for victims who have suffered physical injuries from crime. Compensation is only paid out in instances were victims were unable to obtain adequate compensation from insurance, social security or from the offender. In 2012, over 405,000 Euro was paid out in compensation, exceeding the budgeted amount of 350,000. A request for compensation has to be initiated within two years of an offence occurring and is addressed to the Ministry of justice. A commission formed by a magistrate, senior civil servant of the Minister of Justice and a lawyer will then meet within an applicant to assess if an application is successful. The maximum amount that could be awarded as of 2009 was Euros63,000. By way of appeal, legal action against the State can be brought before the 'tribunal d'arrondissement' of Luxembourg or Diekirch.

Luxembourg has one Directive 2012/29/EU infringement case open against it.

=== Malta ===
In 2015, former justice minister of Malta Chris Said released a report criticising the state of victims' rights in Malta, emphasising the need to increase resources provided to the legal aid office and for the office to expand provisions for victims. Following the report's release, Malta introduced the Victims of Crime Act (2015) on the 2nd April of that year. The act aims to allow victims a greater voice, allowing also the possibility of reconciliation between victim and offender.

According to Roberta Lepre, director of Victim Support Malta, the legislation focusses on expanding information, support, and protection for victims. In terms of information, victims now have the right of easy access to clear information about relevant criminal procedures, support services, free legal aid services, means of accessing compensation, and how to obtain translation services. Victims also have the right to receive acknowledgement of a complaint as well as ongoing information about the case. Further, if the police do not arraign a suspect, the victim has the right to be informed of the decision in writing. When it comes to support, victims have access to free support services following a needs and risk assessment. Support services include counselling and information on how to prevent of further risk of victimisation. Relevant authorities are also obliged to inform victims of ways through which they can be protected, such as seeking a protection order.

=== Netherlands ===
In 1987, a new victim-orientated reform was put in place in the Netherlands, in which victim's interests were to be taken into account during all stages of the criminal justice process, and where victims' rights were recognised in law. Various procedural elements allow for victim compensation. If victims of crime feel they have been unjustly treated and that victim-related rules were not correctly enforced, they can raise a complaint with the Ombudsman. For further victim support, various NGO's operate within Netherlands on a local level and care for victims of crimes through providing emotional support, practical advice and judicial advice. An example of this support is seen within the nationwide agency Slachtofferhulp is partly funded by the government and gives aid to victims in specific groups and to victims of crime in general.

=== Poland ===
Human rights' activists have argued that the Polish criminal justice system fails to effectively assist victims of domestic violence and does not take their cases seriously. Many perpetrators of domestic violence in Poland only receive suspended sentences, with their female partners often being financially dependent on them and having to continue living with them. To improve the rights of domestic violence victims in Poland, the Blue Card program was introduced as a way of standardising police interactions with individuals involved in cases of domestic violence. This program enables victims of domestic violence to access counselling, support and compensation. In 2000 the Ministry of Justice in Poland initiated a Victim Support Week, inspired by the International day of Victims of Crime.

In 2012, a Ministry of Justice directive increased support structures for victims. Victims are now entitled to certain costs of healthcare services, medical products, secondary or vocational education, temporary accommodation, among other facilities. Nonetheless, some have pointed out that the implementation of the program remains uneven and under-supported.

=== Portugal ===
In Portugal, all victims of crime have six immediate rights: information, receipt of the statement complaint, translation, compensation for participation in the process and reimbursement of expenses, compensation from the perpetrator of the crime, and compensation from state. During legal proceedings, a victim in Portugal can assume two roles: as an assistant, where they cooperate with the public prosecutor in the proceedings, or as a civil party, where they act only to provide evidence to support a claim for damages. The Portuguese Government offers several avenues of help and support for victims of crime, including the National Commission for Protection of Children and Young People at Risk, Directorate General of Social Affairs, Portuguese Association for Victim Support, Commission for Equality and Against Racial Discrimination, and Open Window.

=== Romania ===
Counselling is provided to victims of attempted homicide, murder, assault and other violent criminal offences. Counselling is provided free of charge for up to 3 months for adults, and 6 months for victims under 18. Upon application, free legal aid is provided to several categories of victims. Discretionary factors in providing aid include the seriousness of the offence committed and material needs of the victim. Prior to the commencement of Law 211/2004, when a perpetrator of a crime remained unknown, insolvent, or was missing, the victim received no compensation. Currently, upon application, a victim may be granted financial compensation for serious violent and sexual crimes.

The birth of the National Agency for Family Protection has increased support for victims of domestic violence, assisting in the setting up of shelters for victims of domestic violence, recuperation centers for victims of violence, and assistance centers for aggressors.

=== Slovakia ===
Slovakia is a nation where various targeted groups, particularly young women and men, the disabled, the uneducated and the unemployed, are susceptible to fabricated international job prospects which are in actuality human trafficking schemes. Many Slovakian's end up being transported to highly active trafficking countries such as, Germany, Austria, the UK, Ireland, Switzerland and Poland. Slovakia also houses many trafficked victims from Bulgaria, Romania, Vietnam, Ukraine and Moldova. The 2011 National Program to Combat Trafficking in Human Beings for the years 2011–2014 placed some emphasis on ensuring adequate support and care for subjected victims, including victims receiving comprehensive care and preparation for their return to their home country.

=== Slovenia ===
Slovenia regulates the rights of victims of crime under the Criminal Procedure Act, the Witness Protection Act, the Crime Victims Compensation Act, and the Resolution for Preventing and Combating Crime. Victims in Slovenia are entitled to be heard during proceedings, give evidence, pose questions to witnesses and experts involved, be acquainted with their rights, inspect material evidence supplied, and receive assistance from a translator. In certain criminal offences, such as sexual abuse, child neglect, and human trafficking, the injured party is required to have a specific authority to look after their rights, and certain stipulations apply to the investigation procedures, such as preventing the offender from being in the courtroom at the same time as the victim during proceedings.

If during criminal proceedings, the physical safety of the victim and their immediate families is at risk, they are entitled to protection. The Endangered Persons Protection Unit specifically oversees the protection of witnesses under the Witness Protection Act. The unit also engages with non-governmental organizations to provide psychological and legal assistance to protected persons. The unit also provides for alternate measures during proceedings, for example providing evidence via video conference.

=== Spain ===
Victims of crime in Spain have a number of avenues available to them to seek legal compensation or aid for the damages they have suffered. The Ministry of Justice is the state body who is in charge of awarding compensation to victims. It also is responsible for state legal aid, and has a separate department for protection of victims of terrorism-related crimes. Beyond the Ministry of Justice, other organisations provide aids to victims, such as the Office of Crime Victims Assistance Barcelona, the Association of Terrorism Victims, the 11-M Association of Victims of Terrorism and the National Association of Victims of Violent Crime. In a criminal trial in Spain, the victim can choose to participate in the trial either as a witness or as a 'private prosecutor' ('acusación particular') which grants them additional rights and responsibilities, making them an official party to the trial. In exceptional circumstances, a victim may claim emergency compensation before the conclusion of the trial, owing to their financial situation, at the discretion of a relevant authority.

=== Sweden ===
Various laws protecting victims' rights were enacted from the mid-1980s onward in Sweden. In 1988, Sweden ratified the European Convention on the Compensation of Victims of Violent Crimes and passed the Act on Visiting Bans Act on Counsel for Injured Party in 1988. Nowadays, crime victims may be represented by a legal advisor throughout the legal process under the provisions of the latter Act. The Crime Victim Fund, established together with the Crime Victim Compensation and Support Authority, allows the provision of state compensation and of economic support for research, education and support on crime victims.

Crime victims became its own category of responsibility for Swedish social services in 2001 through the Social Service Act. Despite not actually strengthening crime victims' rights in law, it served as a normative reorientation of the Social Services Act towards crime victims. Swedish multiplicities are obliged to offer mediation, based on restorative justice principles, to offenders under 21 years old, with the aim of reducing cases of recidivism. Mediation is one of several procedural operations available to a prosecutor, and mediation may be issued as a lenient sentence for an offender. Some have criticised the mediative approach, arguing that mediation may further violate a victim's integrity and well-being.

== Non-EU European nations ==
=== United Kingdom ===
The main legislation protecting victims' rights is the Victims and Prisoners Act 2024. According to Article 1 of the Act, "victim" in UK law means "a person who has suffered harm as a direct result of being subjected to criminal conduct". A key provision within this Act is the requirement that the Secretary of State issues a non-statutory Victims' Code regulating all public services that are provided to victims. The Victims' Code has been revised several times with the latest edition being 2024 This defines the minimum rights that must be safeguarded for all victims during the criminal process including prosecution, courts and post-release. In addition, victims rights are protected by the Human Rights Act which incorporated into domestic legislation the European Convention on Human Rights.

Apart from statutory victims services, the UK has a strong civil society sector supporting victims. For example, in 1974, the charity Victim Support was set up in Bristol, aimed at providing help and support to victims of crime on a local and national level. The charity offers support to around one million victims of crime per year. People may seek practical or emotional help, for example, making their home secure after a burglary, applying for compensation from the Criminal Injuries Compensation Authority, getting re-housed, or asking for counselling through a GP. In Scotland and Northern Ireland, similar services are provided by the charities Victim Support Scotland and Victim Support NI.

== UN declaration ==
In 1985, the United Nations adopted the Declaration of Basic Principles of Justice for Victims of Crime and Abuse of Power, which outlines international best practices for treatment of crime victims. The report recognizes an offender's obligation to make fair restitution to his or her victim, acknowledges that victims are entitled to fair treatment and access to the mechanisms of justice, and generally draws attention to the need for victims' rights in the criminal justice process.

Other United Nations provisions that touch on victims' rights include The International Covenant on Civil and Political Rights (ICCPR); the Convention on the Elimination of Discrimination of Women (CEDAW); and the Convention on the Rights of the Child (CRC). The ICCPR has been ratified by 172 nations, including the United States, Canada, Russia, and France. It includes the following provisions related to victims' rights:

- Rights to be protected from harm, which impose obligations on governments to have effective criminal justice systems (Article 6.1, Article 7, and Article 17)
- Rights to be recognized by and treated equally before the law (Articles 2, 3, 16, and 26)
- A right of non-discrimination (Article 2)
- Rights to a remedy and to access to justice (Articles 2 and 14)
- Due process rights (Articles 9, 10, 14, and 15)

== Criticisms of the victim-inclusion approach ==
Some academics have argued that the recognition of victims' rights directly undermines defendant's rights, since designating the accuser as a "victim" presupposes that the alleged crime actually occurred, even before it is established to be in a court of law. Others have criticised victims' rights for impinging on prosecutorial discretion. Victims' rights have also been criticised for shifting the focus in criminal proceedings on vengeance and personal emotion. In connection with the last of these criticisms, it has been noted that victims seeking "closure" may promote outcomes as diverse as retribution, on one hand, and forgiveness on the other, and the legal system is inadequate to providing therapeutic satisfaction in either case.

Proponents of victims' rights respond by noting that victims' rights of privacy, protection and participation ensure individual harm is recognized by the system, and that such rights afford a voice in the process, and not a veto of enforcement discretion. Proponents also cite the criminal courts' well-established capacity to afford rights to participants other than the defendants (such as the media), suggesting that accommodation of victims' interests is both possible and desirable. Further, research may suggest the expansion of victim rights', such as victim impact statements, has minimal, if any, impact on criminal sentencing.

== See also ==
- Crime victim advocacy program
- Error of impunity
- Right to an effective remedy
- Right to truth
