= Illusion and Reality =

1937 book by Christopher Caudwell

Illusion and Reality, A Study of the Sources of Poetry
- Author: Christopher Caudwell
- Language: English
- Subject: English poetry Marxist literary criticism
- Publisher: Macmillan
- Publication date: 1937
- Publication place: United Kingdom
- Media type: Print (Hardcover & Paperback)
- Pages: 351 pp.
- OCLC: 02673519

Illusion and Reality is a book of Marxist literary criticism by Christopher Caudwell published in 1937.

== Overview ==
Illusion and Reality was written quickly during the summer of 1935, while Caudwell was in the process of a political conversion to Marxism. Portions of the manuscript were produced at a rate of 5,000 words a day. In its use of political theory and history the book was influenced by the philosophy of Karl Marx, but it also was strongly indebted to the literary criticism of I. A. Richards.

Caudwell develops two main arguments in Illusion and Reality. First, each unique era of British poetry (The Romantic Period, The Age of Pope, etc.) develops from a particular economic arrangement in bourgeois society. Caudwell writes:

"When we use the word 'modern' in a general sense, we use it to describe a whole complex of culture which developed in Europe and spread beyond it from the fifteenth century to the present day. There is something 'modern' in Shakespeare, Galileo, Michael Angelo [sic], Pope, Goethe and Voltaire which we can distinguish from Homer, Thales, Chaucer and Beowulf, and compare with Valery, Cézanne, James Joyce, Bergson and Einstein. This complex itself is changeful—no epoch of human history has been so variegated and dynamic as that from the Elizabethan age to ours. But then, the economic foundations too have changed, from feudal to 'industrial'. This culture complex is the superstructure of the bourgeois revolution in production—a revolution whose nature was first analyzed completely by Marx in Das Kapital. Modern poetry is capitalist poetry.

Caudwell, here, is working within the Marxist framework of base and superstructure and argues that both the poetic form and the content are determined by the economic base. To further illustrate this point Illusion and Reality includes a table that outlines the "General Characteristics" of the capitalist economy in Great Britain during ten different eras and their related bourgeois poetic forms, or "Technical Characteristics," from that same period. For example, Caudwell writes:

	General Characteristics	Technical Characteristics
The Era of Mercantilism and Manufacture, 1688–1750	The Eighteenth Century.--Pope The shortage of labour makes the bourgeoisie continue to ally itself with the agricultural capitalist (the Whig "aristocrat") in order to maintain the laws and restrictions which will keep down the price of labour through the stage of manufacture. Poetry reflects a belief in the rightness and permanence of forms and restrictions, good taste and upper-class "tone".	The outward "rules" are now accepted, not as a compromise but as obvious and rational ingredients of style, measure, polish and the antithesis which restrains natural luxuriance. Vocabulary becomes formalised and elegantly fashionable.

The table provides an outline for the historical progression of forms that Caudwell examines in Illusion and Reality and exemplifies the connection Caudwell sees between poetry and economic social relations.

Caudwell's second major claim is that the act of creating poetry is a response by human instincts to the unfavorable conditions of bourgeois life. In this argument, Caudwell modifies the Freudian understanding of the creative process through Marx.

== Criticism ==
=== Early reviews ===
Illusion and Reality was published shortly after Caudwell's death and was welcomed by Marxist critics who viewed Caudwell as something of a martyr. Among the non-Marxist literary establishment it received little notice.

=== 1950–1951 Caudwell controversy ===
In the Winter (1950–51) issue of The Modern Quarterly, Maurice Cornforth published an article that challenged Caudwell's opinion of poetry—particularly as it appeared in Illusion and Reality. Cornforth argued that Caudwell's theory of poetry was idealized, dependent on a Freudian concept of pre-social 'instincts' that was incompatible with Marxism. George Thomson answered Cornforth in the next issue (Spring 1951) by reaffirming Illusion and Reality's contribution to literary criticism. The next two issues (Summer and Autumn) saw the publication of another twelve responses, all differing on the value of Caudwell's theory. Further responses were also published in journals in both Great Britain and the United States. The debate provoked a re-evaluation of Illusion and Reality and 'The Caudwell Controversy' became an important intellectual moment in the evolution of the British Socialist movement.

=== Later criticism ===
As Marxist Literary theory underwent a 'cultural turn,' Illusion and Reality was increasingly seen as dogmatic and rigid in its discussion of bourgeois poetry. The debate shifted away from its use of Freudian concepts to its ties with Stalinist Marxism. In Culture and Society (1958), Raymond Williams said of Illusion and Reality that it had "little to say of actual literature that is even interesting" and that the book "is not even specific enough to be wrong." Terry Eagleton remarked about Caudwell in 1976 that "there is little, except negatively, to be learnt from him." Even E. P. Thompson, one of Caudwell's most generous late-interpreters, argued that the status of Illusion and Reality should be downgraded among Caudwell's works in favor of Studies in a Dying Culture (1938). From the late 1950s until the late 1980s, Illusion and Reality was equated with vulgar Marxism. However, Christopher Pawling's 1989 book on Caudwell sought to restore the reputation of Illusion and Reality by suggesting that it belongs to what Raymond Williams called an "alternative Marxist tradition" that included Antonio Gramsci, György Lukács, and Lucien Goldmann.
