= Dona Torr =

British Marxist historian (1883–1957)

- Born: Dona Ruth Anne Torr; 28 April 1883
- Died: 8 January 1957 (aged 73)
- Citizenship: United Kingdom
- Education: University College, London (BA)
- Occupations: Historian, translator, author
- Organization: Communist Party Historians Group
- Known for: Translating Marxist works into English
- Notable work: Tom Mann and His Times: Volume 1 (1856-1890)
- Political party: Communist Party of Great Britain (CPGB)
- Spouse: Walter Holmes
- Father: William Torr - Hon. Canon of Chester Cathedral
- Relatives: John Torr (grandfather)

Dona Ruth Anne Torr (28 April 1883 – 8 January 1957) was a British Marxist historian and translator, and a major influence on the Communist Party Historians Group. Besides her translations of several Marx and Engels texts into English, she is known for her biography of labour activist Tom Mann, Tom Mann and His Times, which was completed by others after her illness and death.

== Early life ==
Dona Torr was the daughter of William Torr, vicar of Eastham, Merseyside and later the Canon of Chester Cathedral. She had three sisters and two younger brothers. Her grandfather, John Torr, was a wealthy merchant in Liverpool, a Conservative M.P., and a staunch Anglican. The Torr family was listed in Burke's Landed Gentry. She broke away from her parents at a young age, studying in Heidelberg, Germany, and then obtaining a Bachelor of Arts degree in English from University College, London.

== Career ==
In 1914, Torr joined the Labour Party. She was hired as a librarian by the left-wing Daily Herald newspaper and shared its anti-war position regarding World War I. At the Herald, she met journalist and communist Walter Holmes, whom she would marry. She then worked for the communist newspaper Worker's Life, a forerunner of the Daily Worker.

In 1920, she was a founding member of the Communist Party of Great Britain (CPGB). She initially did behind-the-scenes tasks, such as aiding with Party publications and acting as a bicycle courier during the 1926 General Strike. From 1925 onwards, she and her husband were members of the Party's Colonial Committee, advising groups on Party-building in China, India, Egypt and elsewhere.

With her fluency in German, Torr went to Moscow in 1924 as a translator for the Fifth Congress of the Communist International (Comintern), the proceedings of which were largely conducted in German. After her successful efforts at the Congress, she was invited to translate into English the Soviet-approved German-language edition of the voluminous Marx-Engels correspondence. She did much of the research and writing at the Marx-Engels-Lenin Institute. The resulting book, Karl Marx and Friedrich Engels: Correspondence, 1846-1895, was published in 1934, reissued multiple times, and established her reputation in Britain as a Marxist scholar. She went on to translate Georgi Dimitrov's Letters from Prison (1935) and Engels' The Origin of the Family, Private Property and the State (1940). She wrote supplementary notes for a new edition of Marx's Capital Vol. I (1938). She edited a book with excerpts from the writings of Marx, Engels, Lenin, and Stalin on the subjects of nationalism, imperialism, and war, published in 1940 as Marxism, Nationality and War.

In the mid-1930s, she started to research the life of British trade union leader Tom Mann, publishing a booklet about him in 1936. Her detailed study of Mann and his time period led to her developing ideas about how Marxist historians should apply the theory of historical materialism. She was an early champion of the notion "that the past should be studied through the experiences of ordinary people. Such an approach came to be known as 'history from below'."

At the end of the 1930s, Torr was working for the CPGB's publishing house Lawrence and Wishart when it commissioned a young Oxford don, Christopher Hill, to edit an essay collection celebrating the tercentenary of the English Civil War. According to Antony Howe, Hill's book The English Revolution 1640 was intended to be "a central party text with associated articles and pageantry", but at first the CPGB leadership rejected the book, maintaining that Hill was wrong to portray the English Civil War as a bourgeois revolution. David Renton writes how Torr fought to overcome Party opposition and ensured the book's publication in 1940. She later told other historians "of her gratitude for Hill's 'pioneer work in this sphere'", suggesting that his achievement enabled similar work to flourish.

In the post-World War II years, she mentored young historians on an ambitious project, titled History in the Making, with the first volume published in 1948. Following the Chinese Communist Revolution of 1949, she edited a collection of Marx's New York Daily Tribune articles that contained his observations and predictions related to China. She also continued her Tom Mann research. Historian Harvey J. Kaye writes that for her comprehensive Mann biography, "Torr not only sought to present the life and times of that working-class radical, socialist and activist of the labour movement, but also to link the struggles of the period of his life, 1856–1941, to a long history of struggle for democratic rights in England, originating in the seventeenth century."

In a 1946 essay, she articulated her views on the dialectical progress of history where "gain and loss are two aspects of one movement":

The town, the guild, the open-field system all tell the story of the double-thrust by which as capitalism develops it brings power and wealth to some and dispossession and degradation to others, until the rise of the proletariat into a class capable of ending this process.

She wrote how she looked forward to "that new era of civilisation in which, by assuming conscious, collective control over his own production and social order, [man] will abandon the blind war of every man against every man, and leave 'the conditions of animal existence behind him.'"

Due to Torr's failing health in 1955–56, Volume 1 of her Tom Mann manuscript had to be prepared for publication by Christopher Hill and A. L. Morton. She died on 8 January 1957 at the age of 73. Upon her death, her private library was donated to CPGB headquarters on 16 King Street.

== Influence ==
As early as 1936, Torr set herself the task of promoting historical study by Marxist scholars. She wrote to Party leader R. Palme Dutt that she saw the need to "breed new historians – awaken and train them". She was active in forming a "Marxist Historians' Group" in 1938, initially composed of Robin Page Arnot, Douglas Garman, and her. Although she was not one of the initiators of the Communist Party Historians Group, which was established in 1946, Christopher Hill said "she was at once at home in it, for it gave her the sort of intellectual stimulus of a specifically academic historical kind that she had hitherto lacked.... In fact, she knew more, had thought more about history than any of us; moreover, she put her work, learning, and wisdom at our disposal."

One of those most lavish in praising Torr was E. P. Thompson, who spent many months working with her while researching and writing William Morris: Romantic to Revolutionary (1955). He expressed his gratitude to her in the foreword to the Morris biography:

She has repeatedly laid aside her own work to answer my enquiries or to read drafts of my material, until I felt that parts of the book were less my own than a collaboration in which her guiding ideas have the main part. It has been a privilege to be associated with a communist scholar so versatile, so distinguished, and so generous with her gifts.

Dorothy Thompson (wife of E. P.) wrote of Torr:

Her great fault as a scholar was her generosity. She would always set aside her own work to give a close reading to work of other writers, often spending days in the libraries before she made her final comments. Her letters were full of information and sparkling with ideas, and her conversation was full of wit and insight – on at least one occasion I became so involved in discussion with her that we missed our stop on the underground and had returned to central London before we realized that we had been to Stanmore and back.

John Saville edited the 1954 anthology, Democracy and the Labour Movement: Essays in Honour of Dona Torr. In a foreword written by Saville, Christopher Hill, George Thomson, and Maurice Dobb, they emphasized her impact on the Communist Party Historians Group: "So fertile has she been of ideas that a whole school of Marxist historians has grown up around her, fostered by her unfailing interest and aid.... She made us feel history on our pulses. History was not words on a page, not the goings-on of kings and prime ministers, not mere events. History was the sweat, blood, tears and triumphs of the common people, our people."

Historian Eric Hobsbawm summed up her contribution: "Dona Torr was a powerful influence on several of the young Marxist historians, though not equally close to all. She was the editor of the Selected Correspondence of Marx and Engels (1934). Her published work does not do justice to her impressive erudition, and she never completed what was to have been her major book, Tom Mann and His Times."

Torr's life and work were a featured topic of a "London's Women Historians" conference in 2017, held at the Institute of Historical Research.

== Selected works ==
- Karl Marx and Friedrich Engels: Correspondence, 1846-1895. (1934), translated and with explanatory notes by Torr. OCLC 6428982
- Dimitrov's Letters from Prison (1935), translated by Torr. OCLC 3430949
- Tom Mann (1936) (a Communist Party booklet for his 80th birthday celebration)
- An Introduction to the Paris Commune (1937), co-written with Frank Jellinek. OCLC 27053940
- Marxism, Nationality and War: A Text-book in Two Parts (1940), edited by Torr, Part One, Part Two OCLC 615015600
- Capital: A Critical Analysis of Capitalist Production, Volume I. (1938), with English language notes by Torr. OCLC 1153693224
- The Origin of the Family, Private Property and the State, in the light of the researches of Lewis H. Morgan. (1940), translated by Torr. OCLC 5432193
- Marxism and War (1943). OCLC 921021448
- History in the Making (General Editor) (1948–49) (4 volumes – real editors of vols. 2, 3 & 4 were J. Jeffreys, C. Hill & E. Dell, E. Hobsbawm). OCLC 19487192
- Marx on China, 1853-1860: Articles from the New York Daily Tribune (1951), introduction and notes by Torr. LCCN 71-490825
- Tom Mann and His Times: Vol. 1 (1856-1890) (1956) LCCN 61-20537 Prepared for publication after her illness by Christopher Hill and A. L. Morton.
- "Tom Mann and His Times, 1890–92", originally in the CPGB "Our History" series of booklets, later as a chapter in Lionel Munby (ed.), The Luddites and Other Essays (1971). ISBN 978-0902291010
