= Crime victim advocacy program =

A crime victim advocacy program is a program to assist victims of crime through the criminal justice system. Such a program assists victims of a "General Crime", that is, as any crime committed that is not domestic or sexual in nature. Common examples of general crimes are murder, robbery, identity theft, burglary, vandalism, hate crimes, assault, and threats. In an article written by National Library of Medicine it states, " The prevalence and associated adverse outcomes of violent victimization have led many governmental agencies and community groups to examine how they can support victims of crimes " ( 2022 ). One way in which this has been realized is with the use of victims advocates, individuals whose sole job it is to provide support and advocacy for situations they are found in, by giving them advice, counseling and guidance in the process they are in as well as providing information to the victims for the next steps in their process. Victims advocates benefit the criminal justice system.

Typically, victims of general crimes are an underserved group. Most victim advocacy programs focus on either DV (domestic violence) or SA (sexual assault). Survivors also advocate for improved court procedures and legal assistance for victims. Many crime victims are unfamiliar with the criminal justice system, due to recent immigration, language barriers, or ignorance. In the same article written by National Library of Medicine it also states, " research has shown that some groups are more vulnerable to adverse consequences following crime victimization, including women, people from ethnic minority backgrounds and people with disabilities "( 2022 ). Which comes to show that crime victims sometimes don't know what their rights are and that there is resources provided for them. Victims advocates as well as advocacy programs do have a huge impact in the criminal justice system and are supper beneficial to victims but something that needs to be changes is for victims to have knowledge not caring if they have differences.

== See also ==
- Advocacy
- Criminal justice
- Victimology
- Victims' rights
