= Political Economy Club (1909) =

Political Economy Club

The Political Economy Club was founded in 1909 by John Maynard Keynes. It was an invitation-only club, initially held weekly in Keynes' rooms at King's College, Cambridge. Typically a paper would be read then members would comment on its contents.

Keynes made his last appearance at the club in February 1946, reading a paper about the future of pound sterling and whether the United States dollar would become scarce.

== Participants ==
- Maurice Dobb
- Ralph George Hawtrey (1879 - 1975)
- Harry Gordon Johnson (1923 - 1977)
- John Maynard Keynes (1883 - 1946, founder)
- Dennis Robertson (president circa 1946)
