= Charles Hobday =

English poet

Charles Henry Hobday (9 September 1917 – 2 March 2005) was an English poet. He was a member of the Communist Party Historians Group as well as an editor of the 1940s communist cultural magazine Our Time.

== Life ==
Hobday was born in Eastbourne, East Sussex in 1917. His father was a soldier, and died six months before he was born. After attending the local grammar school, Hobday received a scholarship to the Queen Mary University of London, where he took a first-class degree in history and English. During his studies he became aware of the immense poverty in the city, and joined the Communist Party in 1938.

Hobday spent the Second World War obtaining a master's degree in Cambridge, and did not serve in the military on medical grounds. At this point, his first poems were published in Our Time, a communist literary journal. The journal was edited by Edgell Rickword, who Hobday would later go on to write a biography about in 1989.

After Our Time folded in 1949, Hobday moved to Bristol to work for Keesing's Contemporary Archive. In 1950, he married Inez Gwendolen Beeching. Over the course of the next decade, he became involved in a campaign to democratise the Communist Party, but left in 1957 after the Soviet invasion of Hungary. From the 1960s onward Hobday became more engaged in writing poetry, and less involved in the communist politics of his youth.

In January 1973, Inez Gwendolen Beeching died. Hobday married Helen Strauss, his second and last wife, in 1983. In retirement Hobday wrote many of his most remembered works, including the biography Edgell Rickword (1989); a survey of English poets in Florence, A golden ring (1997); and Elegy for a sergeant (2002), a poem in memory of his uncle who died in the First World War. In 1979, Hobday published the classic essay, "Clouted Soon and Leather Aprons: Shakespear and the Egalitarian Tradition."

While he left the communist party in the 1950s, Hobday remained a socialist and became a member of the Labour Party. However, after the Labour party supported the invasion of Iraq, Hobday left this party too.

Charles Hobday died in 2005, aged 87.

== Works ==
- The return of Cain (1974)
- Titterstone Clee: A poem (1975)
- A Wreath for Inez (1976)
- "Clouted Shoon and Leather Aprons: Shakespeare and the Egalitarian Tradition," Renaissance and Modern Studies 23 (1979): 63-78.
- Communist and Marxist parties of the World (1986)
- Edgell Rickword (1989)
- A golden ring (1997)
- How Goes the Enemy (2000)
- Elegy for a sergeant (2002)
