= The Calendar of Modern Letters =

The Calendar of Modern Letters was a short-lived British literary review journal. It was established by the poet Edgell Rickword, and published from March 1925 to July 1927.

Contributors included Edmund Blunden, Robert Graves, Siegfied Sassoon, D. H. Lawrence, E. M. Forster, Wyndham Lewis, Edwin Muir, Luigi Pirandello, Leonid Leonov, Alexander Nieverov, Isaac Babel, Hart Crane, Allen Tate and John Crowe Ransom.

== Assessment ==
According to literary historian John Lucas: "What established the journal's reputation and gave it, at all events in retrospect, its cachet was less its discovery of new voices than its combativeness as an organ of informed criticism." The Calendar publicly established the modern long-format form of literary criticism.
