= Walter Holmes (communist) =

British communist activist and journalist (1892–1973)

Walter Holmes (1892–1973) was a British communist activist and journalist.

In 1912, Holmes found work in a chemical plant in the East End of London. He became a supporter of Sylvia Pankhurst, and worked with her to support women's suffrage, and later to oppose World War I. In 1916, Holmes began volunteering for the Fabian Research Bureau, but was imprisoned as a conscientious objector, and only released in 1919.

Next, Holmes joined the guild socialist movement. Inspired by the October Revolution, he became a communist and a leading figure in the Guild Communist faction of the National Guilds League. It was one of the factions uniting with the Communist Party of Great Britain (CPGB) that formed in 1920. Holmes was a founding member of the CPGB and remained active in it.

During the early 1920s, Holmes worked as a journalist for the Daily Herald. He married Dona Torr, the newspaper's librarian. In 1928, he took over from William Paul as the editor of the CPGB's Sunday Worker newspaper, serving until 1930, when it was replaced by the Daily Worker. He became a full-time correspondent for the new paper, writing the regular "Workers Notebook" column, and serving as a war correspondent in Manchuria, and later in Ethiopia - the only British journalist to stay in Ethiopia throughout the Italian invasion.

In 1941, the Daily Worker was banned, and Holmes set up the Industrial and General Information Service as a temporary replacement. The ban was soon lifted, and Holmes returned to working for the Daily Worker, also serving as chair of the paper's Communist Party Committee. He was the paper's correspondent at the Nuremberg Trials, and remained with the paper until his retirement in 1966.

Media offices
| Preceded by William Paul | Editor of the Sunday Worker; 1928–1930 | Succeeded by Position abolished |
