= Sam Lilley =

Northern Irish Educationalist

Samuel Lilley (25 June 1914, Belfast – 11 November 1987, Nottingham) was an educationalist, historian of science and broadcaster active in the United Kingdom following the Second World War.

Lilley attended the Belfast Academical Institution followed by Queen's University, Belfast, where in 1935 he gained a first class honours degree in mathematics and mathematical physics. He remained there to study for an M.Sc. in algebraic geometry, before moving to St John's College, Cambridge, where he gained a PhD in 1939.

Lilley's specialisation was the history of science and technology. From 1938 to 1939, he was an assistant lecturer in mathematics at King's College, London. During the Second World War, he worked as an experimental officer in the Armaments Research Department of the Ministry of Supply. In 1940, he was awarded a three-year Fellowship in mathematics at St. John's, but deferred until 1945 when he changed his subject to the history of science and technology. Unable to secure a permanent role in mainstream academia thereafter, he was an extramural tutor at Birmingham University from 1950 to 1956, and then moved to a similar position at the University of Nottingham, where he remained until his death.

Throughout almost his entire adult life Lilley was a member of the Communist Party of Great Britain, having been introduced to the party by his then partner, Pearl Brammar. He was also involved with the Communist Party Historians Group.
