= Maurice Cornforth =

British Marxist philosopher (1909–1980)

Maurice C. Cornforth
- Born: 28 October 1909; Willesden, Middlesex, England
- Died: 31 December 1980 (aged 71); Islington, London, England
- Spouse(s): Kitty Klugmann (died 1965); Kathleen Elliott

Education
- Education: University College London; Trinity College, Cambridge

Philosophical work
- School: Marxism

Maurice Campbell Cornforth (28 October 1909 – 31 December 1980) was a British Marxist philosopher.

== Life ==
Cornforth was born in Willesden, London, in 1909, and educated at University College School, where he was friends with Stephen Spender. In 1925 he went up to University College London, graduating in 1929, and then went on as an affiliated student to read Part II of the Moral Sciences Tripos at Trinity College, Cambridge, where he was the only student on a specialised course in logic, taught by Moore, Braithwaite, and Wittgenstein. In 1931, after graduating, Cornforth was awarded a three-year research scholarship at Trinity. In the summer of the same year he joined the Communist Party, setting up the party's first organisation at Cambridge with fellow students such as David Guest; and in the autumn married a fellow Cambridge student, Kitty Klugmann, sister of James. From 1933 Cornforth worked full-time for the Communist Party in East Anglia.

Rejected for military service on medical grounds, during the Second World War Cornforth worked as a farm labourer. He published his first work, Science Versus Idealism, in 1946. In 1950 he was appointed as managing director of Lawrence & Wishart, a post he held until 1975, during which period he was responsible for the publishing of Marx's and Engels's Collected Works.

Cornforth died aged 71 in Islington, London, in 1980, leaving a widow, Kathleen Elliott, his second wife.

== Philosophy ==
When Cornforth began his career in philosophy in the early 1930s, he was a follower of Ludwig Wittgenstein, writing in the then current style of analytic philosophy. Cornforth later became a leading ideologist of the Communist Party of Great Britain. He was critical of the aesthetic theories of fellow Marxist Christopher Caudwell.

In Defense of Philosophy attacks empiricist philosophies of many kinds, such as those of Rudolf Carnap (linguistic analysis) and William James (pragmatism), on the materialist grounds that they divorce science and scientific investigation from the search for truer understanding of the really existing universe. In this book there is a combination of Marxism with deep insights into the interrelations of the various sciences and the philosophical conundrums produced by the empiricist attempt to reduce science to the collection and correlation of data. Both the insights are based on the theory of the primacy of physical work and tools (thus, "materialism") in the development of specifically human traits such as language, abstract thought, and social organisation, and the essential role of the external world in the increasingly complex development of forms of life.

Cornforth's multi-volume book Dialectical Materialism was originally published in 1953 by the International Publishers, Co., Inc. The first US edition of this work was printed in 1971. The text originated from lectures that Cornforth received funding for from the London District Committee of the Communist Party of Great Britain in 1950.

The first volume, Materialism and the Dialectical Method, provides a good introduction to several important sociological principles: idealism, metaphysics, materialism, mechanical materialism, and dialectical materialism, in addition to Marxist philosophy. Volume 2 of this text is entitled Historical Materialism, and Volume 3 is Theory of Knowledge.

== Works ==
- Food and Farming for Victory, Communist Party Pamphlet (1942)
- Science Versus Idealism: An Examination of "Pure Empiricism" and Modern Logic (1946)
- Dialectical Materialism and Science (1949)
- In Defense of Philosophy – Against Positivism and Pragmatism (1950)
- Science for Peace and Socialism (c.1950) with J. D. Bernal
- Dialectical Materialism Vol. 1: Materialism & the Dialectical Method, Vol. 2: Historical Materialism, Vol 3: Theory of Knowledge
- Readers' Guide to the Marxist Classics (1952)
- Rumanian Summer: A View of the Rumanian People's Republic (1953) with Jack Lindsay
- Science Versus Idealism: In Defense of Philosophy against Positivism and Pragmatism (1955)
- Philosophy for Socialists (1959)
- Marxism and the Linguistic Philosophy (1965) ISBN 0853151199
- The Open Philosophy and the Open Society: A Reply to Dr. Karl Popper's Refutations of Marxism (1968) ISBN 0853153841
- Communism and Human Values (1972) ISBN 0717803783
- Rebels and Their Causes: Essays in honour of A. L. Morton (1978) editor ISBN 0853154805
- Communism & Philosophy: Contemporary Dogmas and Revisions of Marxism (1980) ISBN 0853154309
