= Christopher Caudwell =

English Marxist writer and activist (1907–1937)

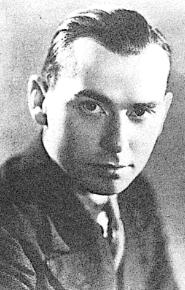
- Caudwell c. 1936
- Born: Christopher St John Sprigg; 20 October 1907; Putney, London, England
- Died: 12 February 1937 (aged 29); Jarama, Spain
- Cause of death: Killed by Spanish nationalists
- Education: St Benedict's School, Ealing
- Occupations: Journalist, author, machine gunner
- Known for: Communist activism, poetry, literary criticism
- Political party: Communist Party of Great Britain (CPGB)

Christopher St John Sprigg (20 October 1907 – 12 February 1937), best known by his pseudonym Christopher Caudwell, was an English Marxist writer, literary critic, intellectual and activist.

== Life ==
Christopher St John Sprigg was born into a Roman Catholic family, in Putney, London, on 20 October 1907. He was educated at the Benedictine Ealing Priory School, but left school at age 15 and worked first as a cub reporter for the Yorkshire Observer, where his father was literary editor, and then as editor of British Malaya.

Two years later he joined an aeronautical publishing company. He invented an infinitely variable gear and published his designs in Automobile Engineer. He was a prolific writer; by age 25 he had already published five aeronautics textbooks, seven detective novels, and books of poems and short stories. He was also following developments in 20th century physics; his writings on the subject were made available posthumously in The Crisis in Physics (1939).

Sprigg became interested in Marxism in 1934 and studied it with "extraordinary intensity". In summer of 1935, he wrote his first Marxist book, titled Illusion and Reality: A Study of the Sources of Poetry, which was accepted for publication by Macmillan. By this time, Sprigg was using the "Christopher Caudwell" pseudonym. Following completion of the book, he joined the Communist Party of Great Britain.

== Death and legacy ==
According to socialist magazine Monthly Review, Christopher Caudwell was killed on 12 February 1937 "by fascists in the valley of Jarama during the Spanish Civil War. He died at a machine gun post, guarding the retreat of his comrades in the British Battalion of the International Brigade". He was 29.

In a 1942 essay, Hugh MacDiarmid labeled Caudwell and John Cornford (another young English writer killed in Spain) the "few inspiring exceptions" among "the leftist poets of the comfortable classes".

In 1949, The Bodley Head published a posthumously discovered Caudwell manuscript, Further Studies in a Dying Culture, and included a preface by Edgell Rickword. Caudwell's prior book, Studies in a Dying Culture (1938), had also been published by The Bodley Head, with a John Strachey introduction. In 1971, Monthly Review Press put out a volume combining the two Dying Culture books.

Lawrence & Wishart selected multiple Dying Culture essays, and chapters from The Crisis in Physics, and published the material in a book titled The Concept of Freedom (1965). In his Manchester Guardian book review, Raymond Williams stated that Caudwell's views on freedom and related topics were still relevant three decades later.

In an assessment of Caudwell's small body of political and cultural writings finished before his death, Marxist historian E. P. Thompson wrote: "It is not difficult to see Caudwell as a phenomenon – as an extraordinary shooting-star crossing England's empirical night – as a premonitory sign of a more sophisticated Marxism whose true annunciation was delayed until the Sixties". The Marxist academic John Bellamy Foster similarly credited Caudwell with "breathtaking intellectual achievements in a brief period of time".

== Works ==
=== Criticism ===
- Illusion and Reality: A Study of the Sources of Poetry (1937)
- Studies in a Dying Culture (1938)
- The Crisis in Physics (1939)
- Further Studies in a Dying Culture (1949)
- Romance and Realism: A Study in English Bourgeois Literature (1970)
- Scenes and Actions (1986)
- Culture As Politics: Selected Writings of Christopher Caudwell (Pluto Press, 2017)

=== Poetry ===
- Poems (1939)
- Collected Poems (1986)

=== Short stories ===
- Scenes and Actions (1986)
- "Death at 8:30"
- "The Case of the Jesting Miser" (unpublished)
- "The Case of the Misjudged Husband"

=== Novels ===
As Christopher St. John Sprigg:

- The Kingdom of Heaven (1929)
- Crime in Kensington/Pass the Body (1933)
- Fatality in Fleet Street (1933)
- The Perfect Alibi (1934)
- Death of an Airman (1934)
- The Corpse with the Sunburnt Face (1935)
- Death of a Queen (1935)
- This My Hand (1936)
- The Six Queer Things (1937)

=== Other ===
- The Airship: Its Design, History, Operation and Future (1931)
- British Airways (1934)

== See also ==
- Maurice Cornforth
