= Communist Party Historians Group =

Historical society

The Communist Party Historians' Group (CPHG) was a subdivision of the Communist Party of Great Britain (CPGB) that formed a highly influential cluster of British Marxist historians. The Historians' Group developed social history, which was popularised in the 1960s with "history from below" approach described by E. P. Thompson. During the heyday of the Historians' Group, from 1946 until 1956, notable members included Thompson, Christopher Hill, Eric Hobsbawm, Raphael Samuel, as well as non-academics like A. L. Morton and Brian Pearce. The Historians' Group arose at the University of Cambridge in the 1930s under the encouragement of the economist Maurice Dobb.

== Aims and methods ==
In their work we can read two definite aims:

1. to seek out a popular revolutionary tradition that could inspire contemporary activists; and yet
2. to apply a Marxist economic approach which placed an emphasis on social conditions rather than supposed "Great Men".

This dualism was represented by Marx and Engels' dictum that "men make their own history, but they do not do so in conditions of their own choosing", which is regularly paraphrased in CPHG members' texts.

Revisiting and reinstating popular agency in the narrative of British history required originality and determination in the research process, to draw out marginal voices from texts in which they were barely mentioned or active. The techniques influenced both feminist historians and the Subaltern Studies Group, writing the histories of marginalised groups.

== Heyday (1939–1956) ==
Although the Historians' Group did not officially exist until 1946, it began informally before the Second World War. The most consequential achievement of the Historians' Group as a result of this period was the development of social history, a field of history that gained prominence in the 1960s with the publication of Thompson's The Making of the English Working Class. Although Thompson's Marxism waned over the course of his career and he would eventually distance himself from structural Marxism, underlying social history ("history from below") is historical materialism.

In 1952 several of the members founded the influential social history journal Past and Present. Another major journal, the History Workshop Journal, also arose from the Historians' Group.

== Post-Hungarian Uprising (1956–1991) ==
The group had been losing members during the Cold War, but lost many more prominent members due to events that shook the Global Communist movement in 1956. First was Khrushchev's Secret Speech, which stunned many diehards and led to discussions in parties around the world about the crimes of Stalin. Instead of this leading to loosening up of the system in the Eastern Bloc it helped trigger the Hungarian Uprising, the brutality of the Soviet invasion disgusted a great many party members who abandoned hope in peaceful reform. The year 1956 thus had several key factors that precipitated something of a sea change in international Marxist opinion. Many figures went on to become prominent in the New Left, especially Samuel, Saville and Thompson. Others stayed in the party, most notably Eric Hobsbawm, who remained in the group, which in 1956 launched a quarterly monograph series "Our History". As the CP History Group, it continued until the CPGB's dissolution at the end of 1991, and even managed to increase its membership and output of publications at a time when the CPGB itself was in terminal decline.

== Socialist History Society (1991–present) ==
In early 1992 it reconstituted itself as the Socialist History Society (SHS), and made full membership available to anybody regardless of party affiliation. The SHS now publishes a twice-yearly journal Socialist History and a series of monographs called "Occasional Papers".

== Notable members ==
- Maurice Dobb
- Christopher Hill
- Rodney Hilton
- Charles Hobday
- Eric Hobsbawm
- Victor Kiernan
- Sam Lilley
- Stephen Finney Mason
- A. L. Morton
- George Rudé
- Raphael Samuel
- John Saville
- Dorothy Thompson
- E. P. Thompson
- Dona Torr

== Bibliography ==
- Ashman, Sam. “Communist Party Historians’ Group”, in John Rees (ed.), Essays on Historical Materialism, London: Bookmarks, 1998, pp. 145–59.
- Crossley, James, A. L. Morton and the Radical Tradition, London: Palgrave Macmillan, 2025, pp. 159–257
- Hobsbawm, Eric. The Historians’ Group of the Communist Party, Verso Books, 9 June 2023, https://www.versobooks.com/en-gb/blogs/news/the-historians-group-of-the-communist-party.
- Kaye, Harvey J., The British Marxist Historians: an introductory analysis, Cambridge: Polity Press, 1984.
- Parker, David. “The Communist Party Historians’ Group”, Socialist History 12 (1997), pp. 33–58.
- Schwarz, Bill. “'The People' in History: The Communist Party Historians Group 1946–56,” in Richard Johnson et al, Making Histories: Studies in History Writing and Politics, London: Hutchinson, 1982, pp. 44–95
