= A. L. Morton =

British historian (1903–1987)

- Born: Arthur Leslie Morton; 4 July 1903; Bury St. Edmunds Suffolk, United Kingdom
- Died: 23 October 1987 (aged 84); The Old Chapel, Clare, Suffolk
- Education: Peterhouse, Cambridge University
- Occupations: Journalist for the Daily Worker. Bookseller. Teacher at Summerhill School
- Known for: Communist activism, founding member of the William Morris Society
- Notable work: A People's History of England (1938)
- Political party: Communist Party of Great Britain (CPGB)
- Spouse: Vivien Jackson

Arthur Leslie Morton (4 July 1903 – 23 October 1987) was an English Marxist historian. He worked as an independent scholar; from 1946 onwards he was the Chair of the Historians Group of the Communist Party of Great Britain (CPGB). He is best known for A People's History of England (1938), but he also did valuable work on William Blake and the Ranters, and for the study, The English Utopia (1952).

== Life ==
Morton was born in Suffolk, the son of a Yorkshire farmer. He had two siblings, a sister Kathleen and a brother Max. He attended school in Bury St Edmunds until he was 16 and then at boarding school in Eastbourne. He then studied the English tripos at Peterhouse, Cambridge, from 1921 to 1924, graduating with a third-class degree. While at Cambridge, he developed friends from within the university Labour club, including Allen Hutt who became a typographer and Ivor Montagu who was later active in the film industry. He encountered socialist ideas, moving towards the communist group at the university around Maurice Dobb.

After college he taught at Steyning Grammar School in Sussex, where under his influence, most of the staff supported the General Strike in 1926. Dismissed as a consequence, he taught for a year at A.S. Neill's progressive school, Summerhill at that time in Lyme Regis. He then moved to London to write and run a bookshop in Finsbury Circus. In 1929 he joined the Communist Party of Great Britain and along with his wife, Vivien, remained a member for the rest of his life. Vivien was the daughter of the socialist Thomas A. Jackson.

Morton belonged to a group of London left-wing intellectuals of the 1930s, while working as a journalist for the Daily Worker. He served on the editorial board of the paper. His friends at that time included A.L. Lloyd and Maurice Cornforth; he assisted Victor B. Neuburg. In 1932 and 1933, he was involved in a debate with F. R. Leavis, in the pages of Scrutiny. He participated in the Hunger marches of 1934.

His 1938 A People's History of England, published by the Left Book Club, was adopted quasi-officially as the CPGB national history, and later editions were issued on that basis.

During the early part of the Second World War, he was the full-time district organiser of the Communist Party's East Anglia district and became chair of the district committee for many years.

Morton spent most of the 1939–45 World War in the Royal Artillery labouring on construction sites in the Isle of Sheppey.

He was part of the group of leading communist historians invited to Moscow in 1954/5, with Christopher Hill, Eric Hobsbawm, and the Byzantine historian Robert Browning. Morton was a founding member of the William Morris Society in 1955.

His devotion to William Morris contrasts with his almost visceral hostility to such "ignoble" authors as Aldous Huxley and especially George Orwell.

In his 1952 work The English Utopia, for example, he characterises Orwell's Nineteen Eighty-Four as representing "the lowest depths to which the new genre of anti-utopias could fall" and which plays on "the lowest fears and prejudices engendered by bourgeois society in dissolution" and in which Orwell is said to resort to "no slander... too gross, no device too filthy."

"Nineteen Eighty-Four is, for this country at least, the last word to date in counter-revolutionary apologetics," he wrote.

Of Huxley's Ape and Essence, Morton says of the author, "It is significant that he never indulges in a general diatribe without adding a specific sneer directed against Communism and the Soviet Union."

Of the Soviet Union itself, Morton in his The English Utopia wrote: "We can see today in the building of socialism a transformation of men and of nature on a scale never before attempted. The fantasies of Cokaygne, the projects of Bacon, the anticipations of Ernest Jones are in effect being translated into facts in the plans which are now (1952) beginning to change the face and climate of the U.S.S.R and other socialist countries."

Morton participated in the People's March for Jobs in the early 1980s, a demonstration of 500 anti-unemployment protesters who marched to London from Northern England.

Morton died in 1987 at his home in The Old Chapel at Clare in Suffolk, aged 84.

== Library ==
A.L. Morton bequeathed his library to the university library of Rostock University in Rostock, Mecklenburg-Vorpommern, Germany (which was then in the German Democratic Republic and named Wilhelm-Pieck-University after the GDR's first and only president, Wilhelm Pieck). The collection comprises more than 3,900 volumes, including all foreign-language editions of A People's History of England, many contain hand-written comments by Morton.

== Works ==
- A People's History Of England (1938)
- Language of Men (1945) essays
- The Story of the English Revolution (1949), Communist Party pamphlet
- The English Utopia (1952)
- The British Labour Movement, 1770-1920 (1956) with George Tate
- The Everlasting Gospel: A Study in the Sources of William Blake (1958)
- The Life and Ideas of Robert Owen (1962)
- The Matter of Britain: Essays in a Living Culture (1966)
- The World of the Ranters: Religious Radicalism in the English Revolution (1970)
- Political Writings of William Morris (1973) editor
- Freedom in Arms: A Selection of Leveller Writings (1975) editor
- Collected poems (1976)
- Three Works By William Morris (1977) editor
- 1688: How Glorious was the Revolution? (1988)
- History and the Imagination: Selected Writings of A.L. Morton (1990) edited by Margot Heinemann and Willie Thompson
