= Formal and effective rights =

Formal and effective rights refers to the distinction between the theoretical rights of legalism and the measurable rights within implemented policies. It is argued that the gap between the two concepts stems from the difficulties in realising the theoretical concepts into manageable effective rights. Also, while there is a greater consensus regarding the formal rights, due partly on diplomacy motives, the actual implementation process is much more complex.

== See also ==
- Claim rights and liberty rights
- Human rights
