= Maurice Dobb =

English Marxist economist (1900–1976)

- Born: 24 July 1900; London
- Died: 17 August 1976 (aged 76)

Academic background
- Education: Pembroke College, Cambridge
- Influences: Karl Marx

Academic work
- Discipline: Political economy
- School or tradition: Marxian economics
- Institutions: Trinity College, Cambridge

Maurice Herbert Dobb (24 July 1900 – 17 August 1976) was an English Marxist economist at Cambridge University and a Fellow of Trinity College, Cambridge. Dobb also helped to establish the Communist Party Historians Group which developed social history and attracted future members of the Cambridge Five to Marxism in the 1930s.

== Biography ==
=== Early life ===
Dobb was born on 24 July 1900 in London, the son of Walter Herbert Dobb and the former Elsie Annie Moir. He and his family lived in the London suburb of Willesden. He was educated at Charterhouse School in Surrey, an elite British public school.

Dobb was admitted to Pembroke College, Cambridge, in 1919 as an exhibitioner to read economics. He gained firsts in both parts of the economics tripos in 1921 and 1922 and was admitted to the London School of Economics for graduate studies under Edwin Cannan and Hugh Dalton.

In 1920, after Dobb's first year at Pembroke College, John Maynard Keynes invited him to join the Political Economy Club, and after graduation Keynes helped him secure his Cambridge position. Dobb was open with students about his communist beliefs. One of them, Victor Kiernan, later said, "We had no time then to assimilate Marxist theory more than very roughly; it was only beginning to take root in England, although it had one remarkable expounder at Cambridge in Maurice Dobb."

=== Communism ===
Dobb joined the Communist Party of Great Britain while in London in 1922. He attracted the interest of British security authorities, and in 1923 he was investigated by MI5.

In the 1930s he was central to the development of the Communist Party at Cambridge University. One of his recruits was Kim Philby, who later became a high-placed mole within British intelligence. It has been suggested that Dobb was a "talent-spotter" for Comintern.

=== Academic career ===
After gaining a PhD in 1924, Dobb returned to Cambridge as university lecturer. Dobb's position at Trinity connected him to it for more than 50 years. He was elected a fellow in 1948, at which time he began joint work with Piero Sraffa assembling the selected works and letters of David Ricardo. The results were eventually published in eleven volumes.

In the 1930s he befriended the philosopher Ludwig Wittgenstein, who stayed with Dobb and his wife for a period.

=== Death and legacy ===
Dobb died on 17 August 1976.

At Trinity, Amartya Sen worked with Dobb and learned from him.

== Economic thought ==
In Dobb's Theories of Value and Distribution Since Adam Smith: Ideology and Economic Theory, he said that marginal utility and individual satisfaction cannot determine prices, as marginalism suggests. He saw a person's preferences and level of satisfaction as heavily dependent on individual wealth, so that marginal utility is determined by spending power. This, according to Dobb, was the distribution of wealth that could alone change prices, as price depended on how much someone would spend. So he argued that individual behaviour cannot influence prices, as there are many other factors such as labour and spending power to affect them. Dobb said the market-socialist model of Oskar Lange and contributions of "neo-classical" socialists were illegitimate "narrowing of the focus of study to problems of exchange-relations."
