= Arthur Evans =

British archaeologist and scholar (1851–1941)

Sir Arthur Evans FRS FBA FREng
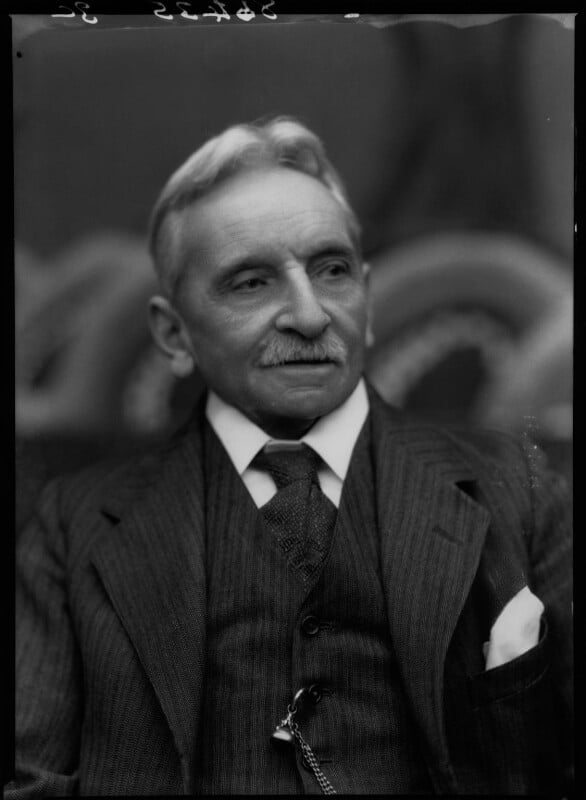
- Evans in 1939
- Born: Arthur John Evans; 8 July 1851; Nash Mills, Hertfordshire, England
- Died: 11 July 1941 (aged 90); Youlbury, Boars Hill, Berkshire, England
- Education: Brasenose College, Oxford
- Known for: Excavations at Knossos; developing the concept of Minoan civilisation
- Awards: Fellow of the Royal Society
- Scientific career
- Fields: Archaeology, museum management, journalism, statesmanship, philanthropy
- Workplaces: Ashmolean Museum

Sir Arthur John Evans (8 July 1851 – 11 July 1941) was a British archaeologist and pioneer in the study of Aegean civilization in the Bronze Age.

The first excavations at the Minoan palace of Knossos on the Greek island of Crete began in 1877. They were led by Cretan Greek Minos Kalokairinos, a native of Heraklion. Three weeks later Ottoman authorities forced him to stop (at the time, Crete was under Ottoman rule). Almost three decades later, Evans heard of Kalokairinos's discovery. With private funding, he bought the surrounding rural area including the palace land. Evans began his own excavations in 1900.

Based on the structures and artefacts found there and throughout the eastern Mediterranean, Evans found that he needed to distinguish the Minoan civilisation from Mycenaean Greece. Evans was also the first to define the Cretan scripts Linear A and Linear B, as well as an earlier pictographic writing.

== Biographical background ==
=== Family ===
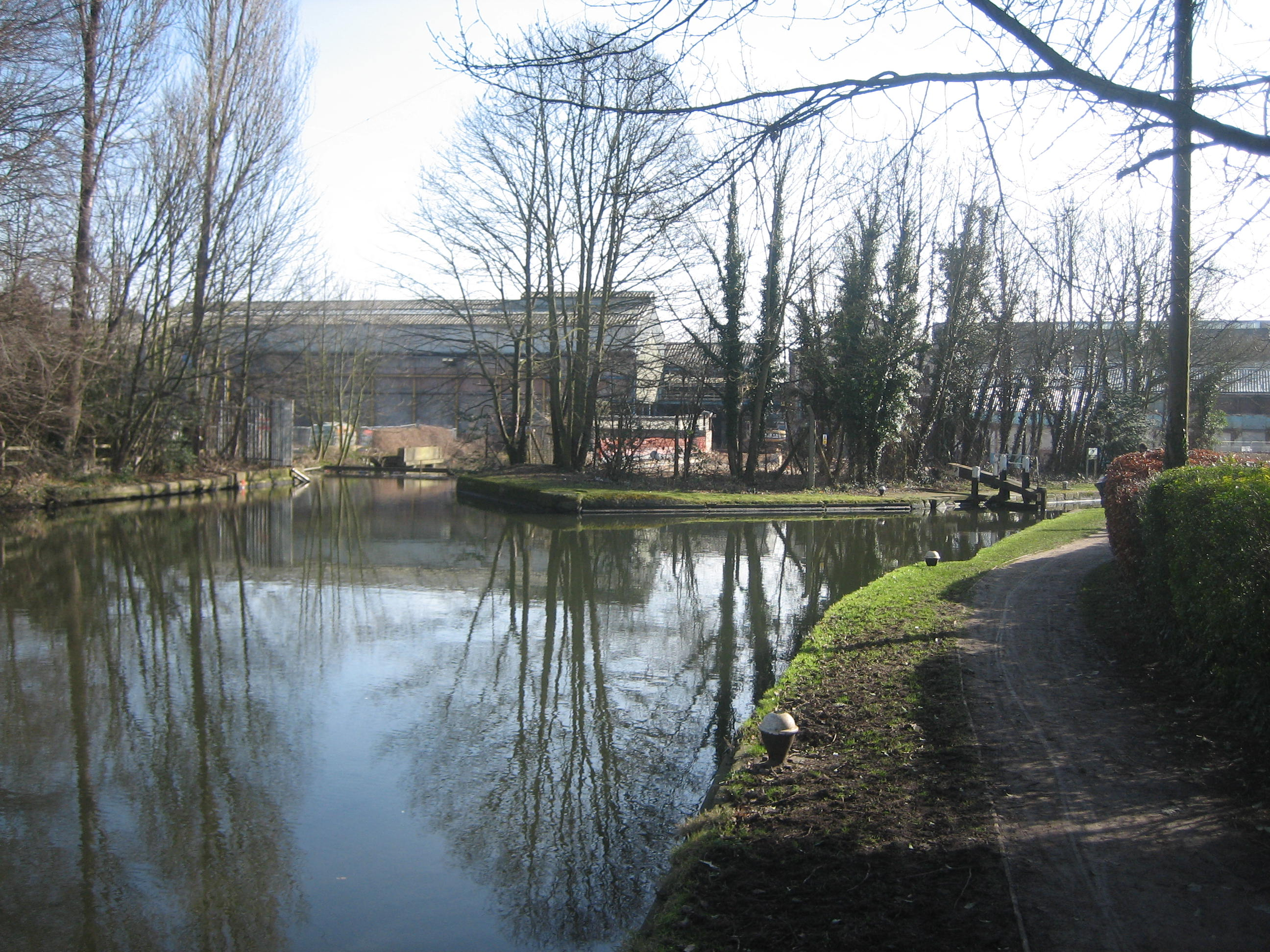
The Nash paper mill

Arthur Evans was born in Nash Mills, Hemel Hempstead, Hertfordshire, England, the first child of John Evans (1823–1908) and Harriet Ann Dickinson (born 1824), the daughter of John's employer and maternal uncle, John Dickinson (1782–1869), the founder of Messrs John Dickinson, a paper mill business. Arthur Evans's grandfather, Arthur Benoni Evans, had been headmaster of Dixie Grammar School at Market Bosworth, Leicestershire. John knew Latin and could quote the classical authors.

In 1840 John Evans started work in the mill owned by his maternal uncle, John Dickinson. He married his first cousin, Harriet, in 1850, and in 1851 became a junior partner in the family business. Profits from the mill would help fund Arthur Evans's excavations, restorations at Knossos, and resulting publications. For the time being they were an unpretentious and affectionate family. They moved into a brick terraced house built for the purpose near the mill, which came to be called the "red house" because it lacked the sooty patina of the other houses. Harriet called her husband "Jack." Grandmother Evans called Arthur Evans "darling Trot," asserting in a note that, compared to his father, he was "a bit of a dunce." In 1856, with Harriet's declining health and Jack's growing reputation and prosperity, they moved into Harriet's childhood home, a mansion with a garden, where the children ran free.

John Evans maintained his status as an officer in the company, which eventually became John Dickinson Stationery, but also became distinguished for his pursuits in numismatics, geology, and archaeology. His interest in geology came from an assignment by the company to study the diminishing water resources in the area with a view toward protecting the company from lawsuits. The mill consumed large amounts of water, which was also needed for the canals. He became an expert and a legal consultant. John became a distinguished antiquary, publishing numerous books and articles. In 1859, he conducted a geological survey of the Somme Valley with Joseph Prestwich.

Arthur Evans's mother, Harriet, died after childbirth in 1858 when he was seven. He had two brothers, Lewis (1853) and Philip Norman (1854), and two sisters, Harriet (1857) and Alice (1858). He would remain on excellent terms with all of them all of his life. He was raised by a stepmother, Fanny (Frances), née Phelps, with whom he also got along very well. She had no children of her own and also predeceased her husband. John's third wife was a classical scholar, Maria Millington Lathbury. When he was 70, they had a daughter, Joan, who became an art historian. John Evans died in 1908 at 85, when Arthur Evans was 57.

=== Education ===
==== Harrow ====
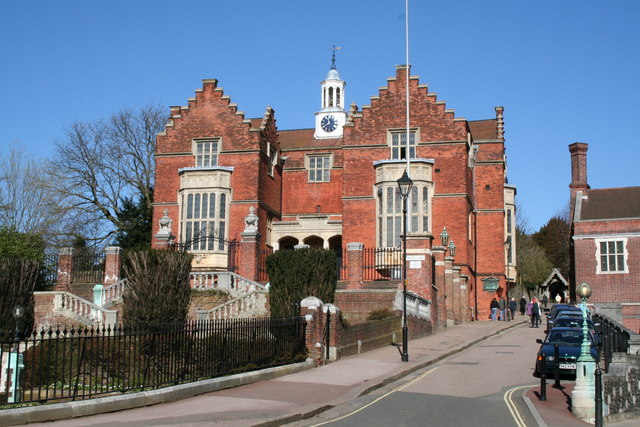
Harrow School

After a preparatory school, Evans entered Harrow School in 1865 at the age of 14. He was co-editor of The Harrovian in his final year, 1869/70. At Harrow he was friends with Francis Maitland Balfour. They competed for the Natural History Prize; the outcome was a draw. They were both highly athletic, including riding and swimming, and also mountain climbing, during which activity Balfour was killed later in life. Evans's field of vision was blurry beyond a close distance. He compensated by carrying a cane, which he called Prodger, to explore the environment. His wit was very sharp, too sharp for the administration, which stopped a periodical he had started, The Pen-Viper, after the first issue.

==== Oxford ====
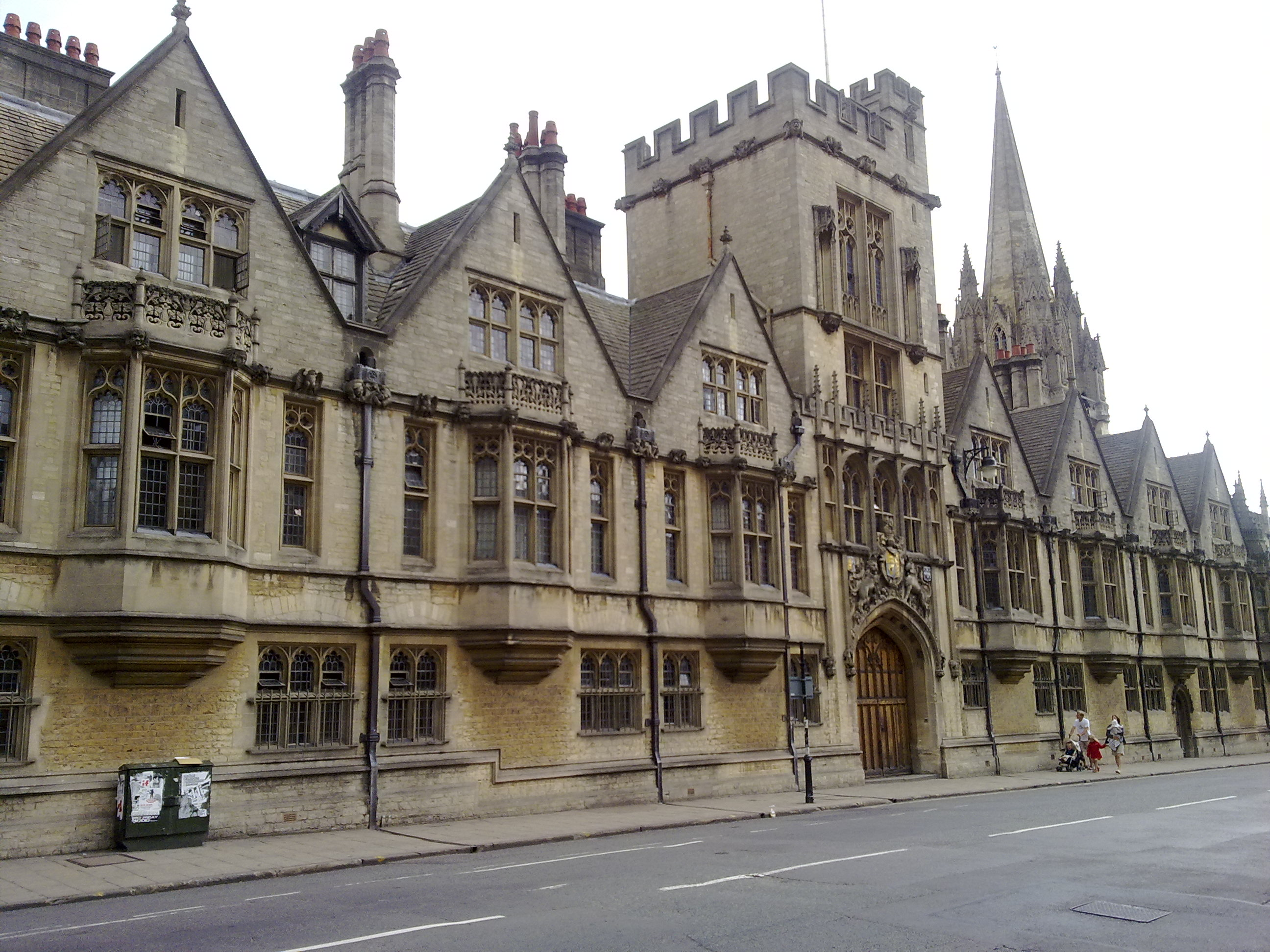
Brasenose College

Arthur matriculated on 9 June 1870 and attended Brasenose College, Oxford. His housemaster at Harrow, F. Rendall, had eased the way to his acceptance with the recommendation that he was "a boy of powerful original mind." At Brasenose College, he read Modern History.

His summertime activities with his brothers and friends were perhaps more important to his subsequent career. Having been given an ample allowance by his father, he went looking for adventure on the continent, seeking out circumstances that might be considered dangerous by some. In June 1871, he and Lewis visited Hallstatt, where his father had excavated in 1866, adding some of the artefacts to his collection. Arthur Evans had made himself familiar with these. Subsequently, they went on to Paris and then to Amiens. The Franco-Prussian War had just concluded the month before. Arthur Evans had been told at the French border to remove the dark cape he was wearing so that he would not be shot for a spy. Amiens was occupied by the Prussian army. Arthur found them prosaic and preoccupied with souvenir-hunting. He and Lewis hunted for stone-age artefacts in the gravel quarries, Arthur Evans remarking that he was glad the Prussians were not interested in flint artefacts.

In 1872, he and Norman adventured into Ottoman territory in the Carpathians, already in a state of political tension. They crossed borders illegally at high altitudes, "revolvers at the ready." This was Arthur Evans's first encounter with Turkish people and customs. He bought a set of clothes of a wealthy Turkish man, complete with red fez, baggy trousers, and an embroidered short-sleeved tunic. His detailed, enthusiastic account was published in Fraser's Magazine in May 1873.

In 1873, he and Balfour tramped over Lapland, Finland, and Sweden. Everywhere he went he took copious anthropological notes and made numerous drawings of the people, places and artefacts. During the Christmas holidays of 1873, Evans catalogued a coin collection being bequeathed to Harrow by John Gardner Wilkinson, the father of British Egyptology, who was too ill to work on it himself. The headmaster had suggested "my old pupil, Arthur John Evans – a remarkably able young man."

Arthur John Evans graduated from Oxford at the age of 24 in 1874, but his career had come near to foundering during the final examinations on modern history. Despite his extensive knowledge of ancient history, classics, archaeology, and what would be termed today cultural anthropology, he apparently had not read enough in his nominal subject to pass the required examination. He could answer no questions on topics later than the 12th century. He had convinced one of his examiners, Edward Augustus Freeman, of his talent. They were both published authors, they were both Gladstone liberals, and they were both interested in the Herzegovina uprising (1875–1877) and on the side of Old Herzegovina insurgents. Freeman convinced Evans's tutors, George Kitchen and John Richard Green, and they convinced the Regius professor, William Stubbs, that, in view of his special other knowledge and interests, and his father's "high standing in learned society", Evans should not only be passed, but receive a first-class degree. It was the topic of much jesting; Green wrote to Freeman on 11 November 1875:

"I am very sorry to have missed you, dear Freeman ... Little Evans – son of John Evans the great – has just come back from the Herzegovina which he reached by way of Lapland, having started from the Schools in excitement at the 'first' I wrung for him out of the obdurate Stubbs ..."

In the spring of 1875 he applied for the Archaeological Travelling Studentship offered by Oxford but, as he says in a letter to Freeman later in life, he was turned down thanks to the efforts of Benjamin Jowett and Charles Thomas Newton, two Oxford dons having a low opinion of his work there.

==== Göttingen ====
In April–July 1875 he attended a summer term at the University of Göttingen at the suggestion of Henry Montagu Butler, then headmaster at Harrow. Evans was to study with Reinhold Pauli, who had spent some years in Britain, and was a friend of Green. The study would be preparatory to doing research in modern history at Göttingen. The arrangement may have been meant as a remedial plan. On the way to Göttingen, Evans was sidetracked, unpropitiously for the modern history plan, by some illegal excavations at Trier. He had noticed that the tombs were being plundered surreptitiously. For the sake of preserving some artefacts, he hired a crew, performed such hasty excavations as he could, crated the material and sent it home to John.

Göttingen was not to Evans's liking. His quarters were stuffy, and the topics were of little interest to him, as he had already demonstrated. His letters speak mainly of the discrepancy between the poor peasants of the countryside and the institution of the wealthy in the town. His thinking was of a revolutionary bent. Deciding not to stay, he left there to meet Lewis for another trip to Old Herzegovina. That decision marked the end of his formal education. Herzegovina was then in a state of insurrection. The Ottomans were using bashi-bazouks to try to quell it. Despite subsequent events, there is no evidence that the young Evans might have had ulterior motives at this time, despite the fact that Butler had helped to educate half the government of the United Kingdom. He was simply an adventurous young man bored with poring through books in a career into which he had been pushed against his real interests. The real adventure, in his mind, was the revolution in the Balkans.

== Career ==
=== Agent in the Balkans ===
After resolving to leave Göttingen, Evans and Lewis planned to spy against the Principality of Montenegro in the rebellious mountain village of Bobovo, Pljevlja, which was, at the time of their journey, the strongest point of resistance in the triple mountain ranges of Ljubišnja and Tara gorges. During the struggle in Bobovo on 15 August 1875 during the Herzegovina uprising (1875–1877) they were expelled from Province of Pljevlja by the Ottoman authorities and went to board a ship in the city of Dubrovnik via Pljevlja, a city with a large settlement from the Roman period, which Evans named as the Municipium S.

They knew that the region, a part of the Ottoman Empire, was under martial law and that the Christians were in a state of insurrection against the Muslim beys placed over them. Some Ottoman troops were in the country in support of the beys, but mainly the beys were using irregular forces, the bashi-bazouks, loosely attached to the Ottoman military. Their notorious cruelty, which they practised against the natives, helped to turn the British Empire under W. E. Gladstone against the Ottoman Empire, as well as to attract Russian intervention at Serbian request. At the time of Evans's and Lewis's initial adventure, the Ottomans were still trying to lessen the threat of intervention by placating their neighbours. Evans sought and obtained permission to travel in Bosnia from its Ottoman military governor.

The two brothers experienced little difficulty with either the Serbs or the Ottomans but they did provoke the neighbouring Austro-Hungarian Empire and spent a night in "a wretched cell". After deciding to lodge in a good hotel in Slavonski Brod on the border, having judged it safer than Bosanski Brod across the Sava River, they were observed by an officer who saw their sketches and concluded they might be Russian spies. Politely invited by two other officers to join the police chief and produce passports, Evans replied, "Tell him that we are Englishmen and are not accustomed to being treated in this way". The officers insisted and, interrupting the chief at dinner, Evans suggested he should have come to the hotel in person to request the passports. The chief, in a somewhat less than civil manner, won the argument about whether he had the right to check the passports of Englishmen by inviting them to spend the night in a cell.

On the way to the holding cell the two young men were followed by a large crowd, whom Evans lost no opportunity to harangue, even though they understood only German. He threatened the authorities in the name of the British fleet, which, he asserted, would sail up the Sava river. He demanded the mayor, offered the jailer a bribe for food and water, but went into the cell unfed and without water. Meanwhile, the incident came to attention of Dr Makanetz, leader of the National Party of the Croatian Assembly, who happened to be in Brod. The next day he complained to the mayor. Evans and his brother were released with profuse apologies.

They crossed the Sava into Bosnia, which Evans found so different that he regarded the Sava as the border between Europe and Asia. After a number of interviews with Ottoman officials who attempted to dissuade them from travel on foot, the passport from the pasha prevailed. They were given an escort – one man, enough to establish authority – as far as Derventa. From there they travelled directly south to Sarajevo and from there to Dubrovnik (Ragusa) on the coast, in Dalmatia. In Sarajevo they learned that the region through which they had just passed was now "plunged in civil war".

==== Reporter for The Manchester Guardian ====
Home again, Evans wrote of his experiences, working from his extensive notes and drawings, publishing Through Bosnia and Herzegovina, which came out in two editions, 1876 and 1877. He became overnight an expert in Balkan affairs. The Manchester Guardian hired him as a correspondent, sending him back to the Balkans in 1877. He reported on the suppression of the Christian insurrectionists by the military of the Ottoman Empire, and yet was treated by the Ottomans as though he were an ambassador, despite his anti-Turkish sentiments. His older interests in antiquities continued. He collected portable artefacts, especially seal stones, at every opportunity, between sending back article after article to The Guardian. He also visited the Freemans in Sarajevo whenever he could. A relationship with Freeman's eldest daughter, Margaret, had begun to blossom. In 1878 the Russians compelled a settlement of the conflict on appeal by the Serbs. The Ottomans ceded Bosnia and Herzegovina to the Austro-Hungarian Empire as a protectorate.

In 1878, Evans proposed to Margaret Freeman, three years his senior, an educated and literate woman, and until now secretary for her father. The offer was accepted, to everyone's great satisfaction. Freeman spoke affectionately of his future son-in-law. The couple were married near the Freeman home in Wookey, Somerset, at the parish church. They took up residence in a Venetian villa Evans had purchased in Ragusa, Casa San Lazzaro, on the bluffs overlooking the Adriatic. One of their first tasks was to create a garden there. They lived happily, Evans pursuing his journalistic career, until 1882.

Evans's continued stance in favour of native government led to a condition of unacceptability to the local regime within the Austro-Hungarian Empire. He did not see Austro-Hungarian rule in Bosnia and Herzegovina as an improvement over Ottoman. He wrote: "The people are treated not as a liberated but as a conquered and inferior race...." The Evans's sentiments were followed by acts of personal charity: they took in an orphan, invited a blind woman to dinner every night. Finally Evans wrote some public letters in favour of an insurrection. Evans was arrested in 1882, to be put on trial as a British agent provocateur stirring up further insurrection. His journalistic sources were not acceptable friendships to the authorities. He spent six weeks in prison awaiting trial, but at the trial nothing definitive could be proved. His wife was interrogated. She found most offensive the reading of her love letters before her eyes by a hostile police agent. Evans was expelled from the country. Gladstone had been apprised of the situation immediately, but, as far as the public knew, did nothing. The government in Vienna similarly disavowed any knowledge of or connection to the actions of the local authorities. The Evans returned home to rent a house in Oxford, abandoning their villa, which became a hotel. However, Evans's reputation among the Slavs assumed unassailable proportions. He was invited later to play a role in the formation of the pre-Yugoslav state. In 1941 the government of Yugoslavia sent representatives to his funeral.

During Gascoyne-Cecil's first tenure as prime minister from 1885 to 1886, the English public held negative views of the Kingdom of Serbia and instead supported the Kingdom of Bulgaria. A Times correspondent said Serbia was the biggest threat to peace in the Balkans. This view was refuted by Evans, who stated that Serbs in Kosovo and Metohija were facing terror from the hand of local Albanian population, with murders being a daily occurrence.

=== Keeper of the Ashmolean Museum ===
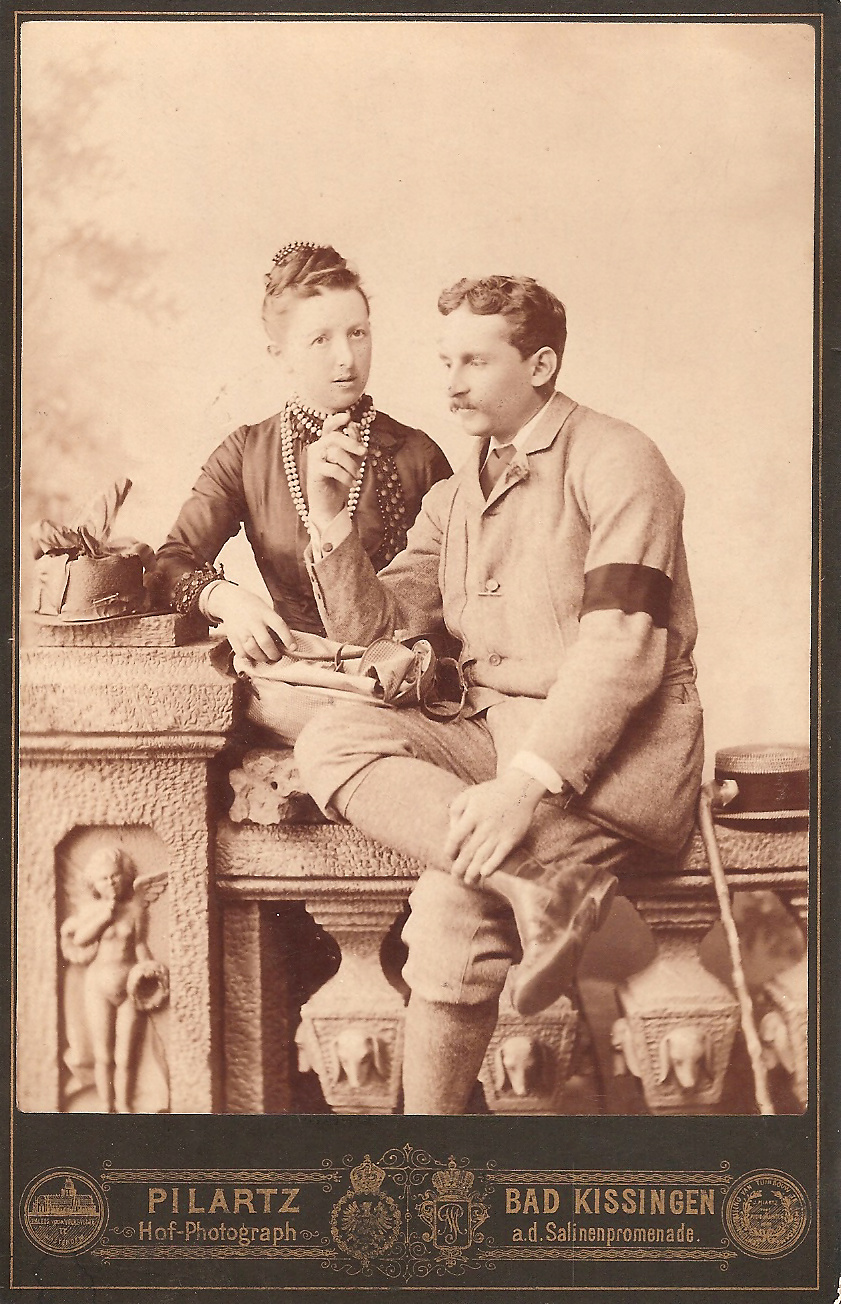
Margaret and Arthur Evans in 1888

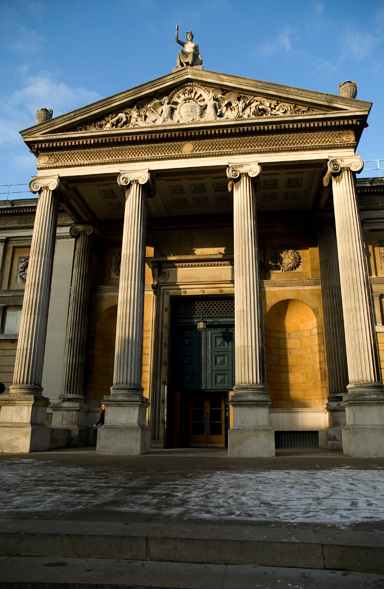
The Ashmolean Museum

Evans and his wife moved back to Oxford, renting a house there in January 1883. This period of unemployment was the only one of his life; he employed himself finishing up his Balkan studies. He completed his articles on Roman roads and cities there. It was suggested that he apply to a new professorship of Classical Archaeology at Oxford. When he found out that Jowett and Newton were among the electors, he decided not to apply. He wrote to Freeman that to confine archaeology to classics was an absurdity. Instead he and Margaret travelled to Greece, seeking out Heinrich Schliemann at Athens. Margaret and Sophia had a visit for several hours, during which Evans examined the Mycenaean antiquities at hand with Heinrich.

Meanwhile, the Ashmolean Museum, an adjunct of Oxford University, was in a chaotic state of transition. It had been a natural history museum, but the collections had been transferred to other museums. The lower floor housed some art and archaeology, but the upper floor was being used for university functions. John Henry Parker, appointed the first keeper in 1870, had the task of trying to manage it. His efforts to negotiate with the art collector Charles Drury Edward Fortnum, over housing his extensive collection, were being undercut by university administrators. In January 1884, Parker died. The museum was in the hands of its assistant keepers, one of whom, Edward Evans (no relation), was to be Arthur Evans's executive during Evans's extended absences.

The strategy for the museum now was to convert it to an art and archaeology museum, expanding the remaining collections. In November 1883, Fortnum wrote to Evans asking for his assistance in locating some letters in the Bodleian Library that would help to validate a noted ring in his collection; he did so on the advice of John Evans of the Society of Antiquaries. Unable to find the letters, Arthur Evans suggested Fortnum visit Oxford. Fortnum in fact was becoming dissatisfied with rivals for his collection, the South Kensington Museum, because of their "lack of a properly informed and competent person as keeper." Evans had the right qualifications and took the position of keeper at the Ashmolean when it was offered.

In 1884, therefore, Evans, at the age of 34, was appointed Keeper of the Ashmolean Museum. He held a grand inauguration at which he outlined his planned changes, publishing it as The Ashmolean as a Home of Archaeology in Oxford. Already the great frontage building had been erected. Evans took it in the direction of being an archaeology museum. He insisted the artefacts be transferred back to the museum, negotiated for and succeeded in acquiring Fortnum's collections, later gave his father's collections to the museum, and finally, bequeathed his own Minoan collections, not without the intended effect. Today it has the finest Minoan assemblages outside Crete. Evans gave the Ilchester Lectures for 1884 on the Slavonic conquest of Illyricum, which remained unpublished.

== Archaeologist ==
=== Excavations at Aylesford ===
A cemetery of the British Iron Age discovered in 1886 at Aylesford in Kent was excavated under the leadership of Evans, and published in 1890. With the later excavation by others at Swarling not far away (discovery to publication was 1921–1925) this is the type site for Aylesford-Swarling pottery or the Aylesford-Swarling culture, which included the first wheel-made pottery in Britain. Evans's conclusion that the site belonged to a culture closely related to the continental Belgae, remains the modern view, though the dating has been refined to the period after about 75 BC. His analysis of the site was still regarded as "an outstanding contribution to Iron Age studies" with "a masterly consideration of the metalwork" by Sir Barry Cunliffe in 2012.

=== End and beginning ===
In 1893, Evans's way of life as a married, middling archaeologist, puttering around the Ashmolean, and travelling extensively and perpetually on holiday with his beloved Margaret, came to an abrupt end, leaving emotional devastation in its wake and changing the course of his life. Freeman died in March 1892. Always of precarious health, he had heard that Spain had a salubrious climate. Travelling there to test the hypothesis and perhaps improve his physical condition, he contracted smallpox and was gone in a few days. His oldest daughter did not survive him long. Always of precarious health herself – she is said to have had tuberculosis – she was too weak to prepare her father's papers for publication, so she delegated the task to a family friend, Reverend William Stephens.

In October of that year Evans took her to visit Boar's Hill, near Oxford. He wanted to buy 60 acres to build a home for Margaret on the hill. She approved the location, so he convinced his father to put up the money. Then he had the tops of the pines cut, eight feet from the ground, on which he had built a platform and a log cabin to serve as a temporary quarters while the mansion was being built. His intent was to keep her from the cold, damp ground. Apparently she never lived there. They were away again for the winter, Margaret to winter with her sister in Bordighera, Evans to Sicily to complete the last volume of the history he and Freeman had begun together.

In February, Evans met John Myres, a student at the British School, in Athens. The two shopped the flea markets looking for antiquities. Evans purchased some seal stones inscribed with a mysterious writing, said to have come from Crete. Then he met Margaret in Bordighera. The two started back to Athens, but en route, in Alassio, Italy she was overtaken by a severe attack. On 11 March 1893, after experiencing painful spasms for two hours, she died with Evans holding her hand, of an unknown disease, perhaps tuberculosis, although the symptoms fit a heart attack also. He was 42; she, 45.

Margaret was buried in the English cemetery at Alassio. Her epitaph says, in part, "Her bright, energetic spirit, undaunted by suffering to the last, and ever working for the welfare of those around her, made a short life long." Evans placed on the grave a wreath he wove himself of ox-eye daisies (also known as marguerites) and wild broom, expressive of their innermost feelings, commemorating the event with a private poem, To Margaret my beloved wife, not published until after his death decades later:

"Of Margarites and mountain heath
And scented broom so white –
Such as herself she plucked, – a wreath
I wreathe for her tonight.
...
For she was open as the air
Pure as the blue of heaven
And truer love – or pearl so rare
To man was never given."

To his father he wrote: "I do not think anyone can ever know what Margaret has been to me." He never married again. For the rest of his life he wrote on black-bordered stationery. He went ahead with the mansion he had planned to build for Margaret on Boars Hill in Berkshire (now Oxfordshire), against the advice of his father, who regarded it as wasteful and useless. He called it Youlbury, after the name of the locality.

=== Waiting for the future ===
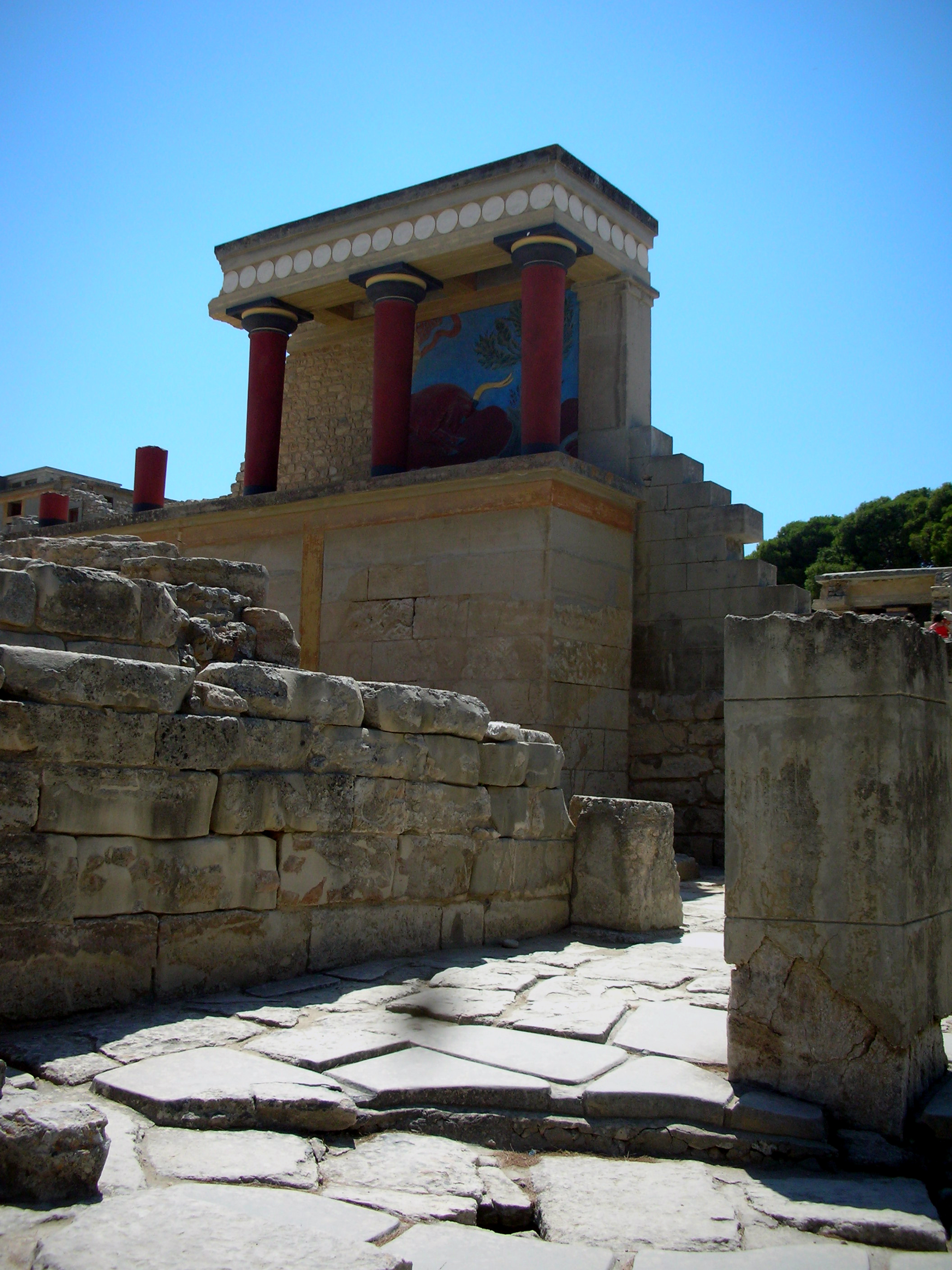
A portion of Evans's reconstruction of the Minoan palace at Knossos. This is Bastion A at the North Entrance, noted for the Bull Fresco above it.

After Margaret's death Evans wandered aimlessly around Liguria ostensibly looking at Terramare Culture sites and for Neolithic remains in Ligurian caves. Then he revisited the locations of his youthful explorations in Zagreb. Finally he returned to live a hermit-like existence in the cabin he had built for her. The Ashmolean no longer interested him. He complained to Fortnum in a late, childish display of sibling rivalry, that his father had had another child, his half-sister Joan. After a year of grief the mounting tension in Crete began to attract his interest. Knossos was now known to be a major site, thanks to Evans's old friend and fellow journalist in Bosnia, William James Stillman. Another old friend, Federico Halbherr, the Italian archaeologist and future excavator of Phaistos, was keeping him posted on developments at Knossos by mail.

Archaeologists from Britain, France, Germany, Italy and the United States were in attendance at the site watching the progress, so to speak, of the "sick man of Europe", a metaphor of the dying Ottoman Empire. The various pashas, eager not to offend the native Cretan parliament, were encouraging foreigners to apply for a firman to excavate, and then not granting any. The Cretans were afraid of the Ottomans' removing any artefacts to Istanbul. The Ottoman method of stalling was to require any would-be excavators to buy the site from its native owners first. The owners in turn were coached to charge so much money that none would think it worthwhile to apply in such uncertain circumstances. Even the wealthy Schliemann had given up on the price in 1890 and had gone home to die in that year.

In 1894, Evans became intrigued by the idea that the script engraved on the seal stones he had purchased before Margaret's death might be Cretan, and steamed off to Heraklion to join the circle of watchers. During his year of tending to the details of Youlbury, administering the Ashmolean, and writing some minor papers, he had also discovered the script on some other jewellery that came to the museum from Myres in Crete. He announced that he had concluded to a Mycenaean hieroglyphic script of about 60 characters. Shortly he wrote to his friend and patron at the Ashmolean, Charles Fortnum, that he was "very restless" and must go to Crete.

Arriving in Heraklion he did not join his friends immediately, but took the opportunity to examine the excavations at Knossos. Seeing the sign of the double axe almost immediately he knew that he was at the home of the script. He used the Cretan Exploration Fund, devised on the model of the Palestine Exploration Fund, to acquire the site. The owners would not sell to individuals, who could not afford it, but they would sell to a fund. Apparently Evans did not bother to explain that he was the only contributor. He bought 1/4 of the site with first option to buy the rest later. The firman was still in deficit. Politics in Crete were taking a violent turn however. Anything might happen. Evans returned to London to wind up his affairs there and make sure the Ashmolean had suitable direction in the event of his further absence.

=== Religious violence in Crete ===
In 1898, he became one of the first reporters of the ethnic cleansing of Turkish Cretans by Greek forces. In September 1898, the last of the Turkish troops withdrew from Crete. Their withdrawal did not however presage peace, and religious violence against the Muslim minority ensued. The British Army forbade travel for any reason with checkpoints set up to enforce this. Despite this Evans, Myres and Hogarth returned to Crete together, Evans in his capacity as a journalist for the Manchester Guardian. He took a combative stance in his journalism, criticising the Ottoman Empire for its 'corruption' and the British empire for 'collaborating with the Ottomans.' Many officials of that empire had been Greek. Now they were working with the British to build a Cretan government. Evans accused these officials of being part of "the Turco-British regime". He deplored religiously motivated violence, be it from Muslims or Christians. His critical journalism caused friction with the local administration, and he was forced to call on friends higher up in the government to avoid problems.

Evans travelled widely in his reporting. He saw that the Muslim population was now on the decline, some being massacred, and some abandoning the island. One of the episodes he reported on was a massacre at Eteà. The Muslim villagers had been attacked by Christians in the night. They sought refuge in a mosque. The next day they were promised clemency if they would disarm themselves. Handing over their weapons, they were lined up, having been told they were to be re-settled. Instead, they were shot, the only survivor being a small girl who had a cape thrown over her to conceal her. In his report to The Manchester Guardian in 1898, he described this ethnic cleansing of Cretan Muslim civilians by saying:

But the most deliberate act of extermination was that perpetrated at Eteà. In this small village, too, the Moslem inhabitants, including the women and children, had taken refuge in the mosque, which the men defended for a while. The building itself is a solid structure, but the door of the small walled enclosure ... was finally blown in, and the defenders laid down their arms, understanding, it would appear, that their lives were to be spared. Men, women and children, they were all led forth to the church of St. Sophia, which lies on a hill about half an hour above the village, and then and there dispatched—the men cut to pieces, the women and children shot. A young girl who had fainted, and was left for dead, alone lived to tell the tale.

Prince George was keen to avoid such massacres, and establish a functioning government on the island. In 1899 a cross-confessional government was established as part of a republican Crete.

=== Excavations of Knossos ===
Now that the restriction of the Ottoman firman was removed, there was a great rush on the part of all the other archaeologists to obtain first permission to dig from the new Cretan government. They soon found that Evans had a monopoly. Using the Cretan Exploration Fund, now being swollen by contributions from others, he paid off the debt for the land. Then he ordered stores from Britain. He hired two foremen, and they in turn hired 32 diggers. He started work on the flower-covered hill in March 1900.

Assisted by Duncan Mackenzie, who had already distinguished himself by his excavations on the island of Melos, and Mr Fyfe, an architect from the British School at Athens, Evans employed a large staff of local labourers as excavators, and began work in 1900. Within a few months they had uncovered a substantial portion of what he called the Palace of Minos. The term "palace" may be misleading; Knossos was an intricate collection of over 1,000 interlocking rooms, some of which served as artisans' workrooms and food processing centres (e.g., wine presses). It served as a central storage point, and a religious and administrative centre.

On the basis of the ceramic evidence and stratigraphy, Evans concluded that there was another civilisation on Crete that had existed before those brought to light by the adventurer-archaeologist Heinrich Schliemann at Mycenae and Tiryns. The small ruin of Knossos spanned 5 acres (2.0 ha) and the palace had a maze-like quality that reminded Evans of the labyrinth described in Greek mythology. In the myth, the labyrinth had been built by King Minos to hide the Minotaur, a half-man half-bull creature that was the offspring of Minos's wife, Pasiphae, and a bull. Evans dubbed the civilisation once inhabiting this great palace the Minoan civilisation.

By 1903, most of the palace was excavated, bringing to light an advanced city containing artwork and many examples of writing. Painted on the walls of the palace were numerous scenes depicting bulls, leading Evans to conclude that the Minoans did indeed worship the bull. In 1905 he finished excavations. He then proceeded to have the room called the throne room (due to the throne-like stone chair fixed in the room) repainted by a father–son team of Swiss artists, Émile Gilliéron père and fils. While Evans based the recreations on archaeological evidence, some of the best-known frescoes from the throne room were almost complete inventions of the Gilliérons, according to his critics.

== Senior trustee ==
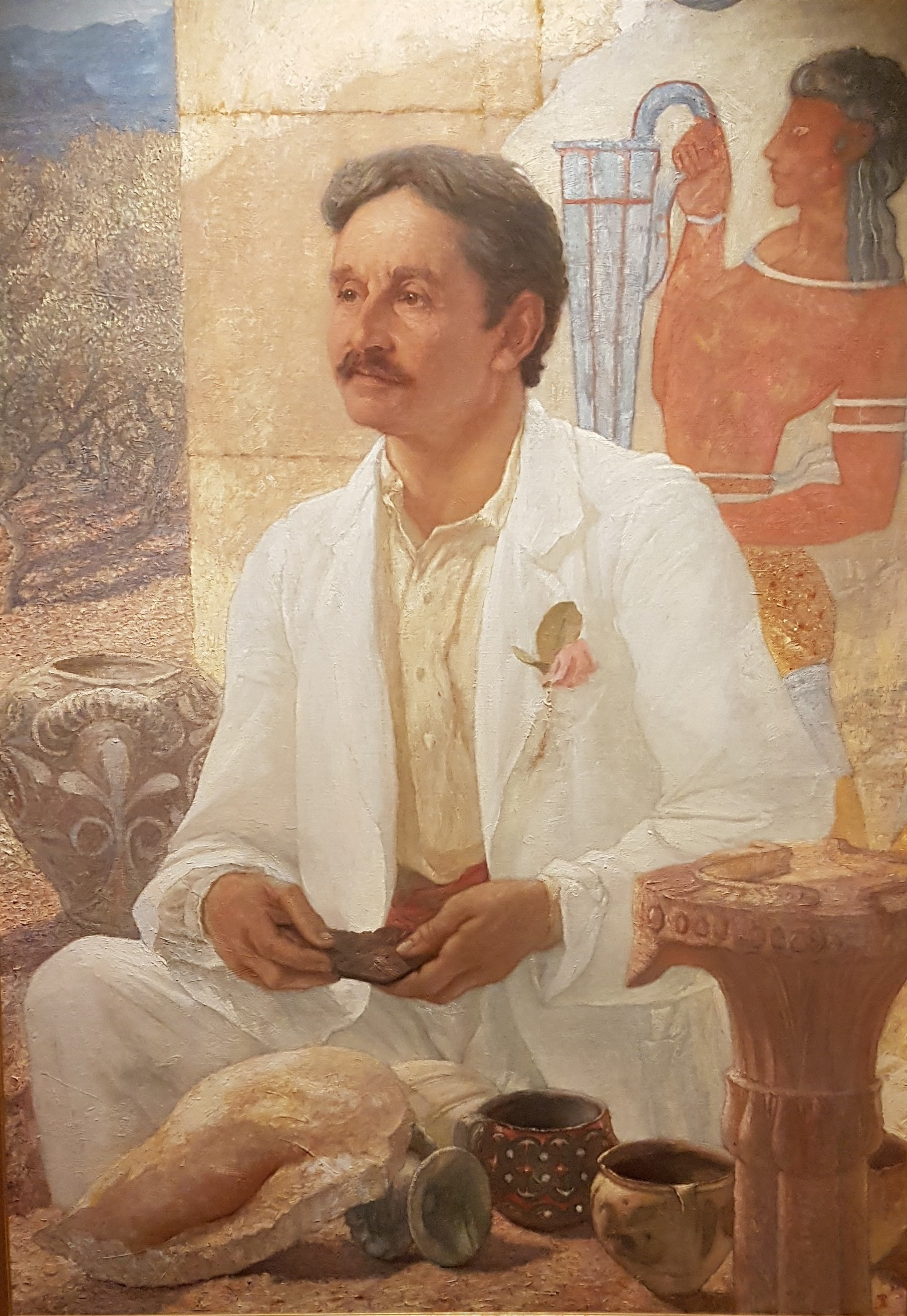
Portrait 1907, by William Richmond

All the excavations at Knossos were done on leave of absence from the museum. "While the Keeper's salary was not generous, the conditions of residence were very liberal ... the keeper could and should travel to secure new acquisitions". But in 1908 at the age of 57 he resigned his position to concentrate on writing up his Minoan work. In 1912 he refused the opportunity to become president of the Society of Antiquaries, a position which his father had already held. But in 1914 at the age of 63, when he was too old to take part in the War, he took on the presidency of the Antiquaries which carried with it an ex officio appointment as a Trustee of the British Museum and he spent the War successfully fighting the War Office who wanted to commandeer the museum for the Air Board. He thus played a major role in the history of the British Museum as well as in the history of the Ashmolean Museum.

== Major creative works ==
=== Scripta Minoa ===
During excavations by Evans, he found 3,000 clay tablets, which he transcribed and organised, publishing them in Scripta Minoa. As some of them are now missing, the transcriptions are the only source of the marks on the tablets. He perceived that the scripts were two different and mutually exclusive writing systems, which later he termed into Linear A and Linear B. The A script appeared to have preceded the B. Evans dated the Linear B Chariot Tablets, so called from their depictions of chariots, at Knossos to immediately prior to the catastrophic Minoan civilisation collapse of the 15th century BC.

One of Evans's theses in the 1901 Scripta Minoa, is that most of the symbols for the Phoenician alphabet (abjad) are almost identical to the many centuries older, 19th century BC, Cretan hieroglyphs.

The basic part of the discussion about Phoenician alphabet in Scripta Minoa, Vol. 1 takes place in the section Cretan Philistines and the Phoenician Alphabet. Modern scholars now see it as a continuation of the Proto-Canaanite alphabet from ca. 1400 BC, adapted to writing a Canaanite (Northwest Semitic) language. The Phoenician alphabet seamlessly continues the Proto-Canaanite alphabet, by convention called Phoenician from the mid-11th century, where it is first attested on inscribed bronze arrowheads.

Evans had no better luck with Linear B, which turned out to be Greek. Despite decades of theories, Linear A has not been convincingly deciphered, nor even the language group identified. His classifications and careful transcriptions have been of great value to Mycenaean scholars.

== Honours ==
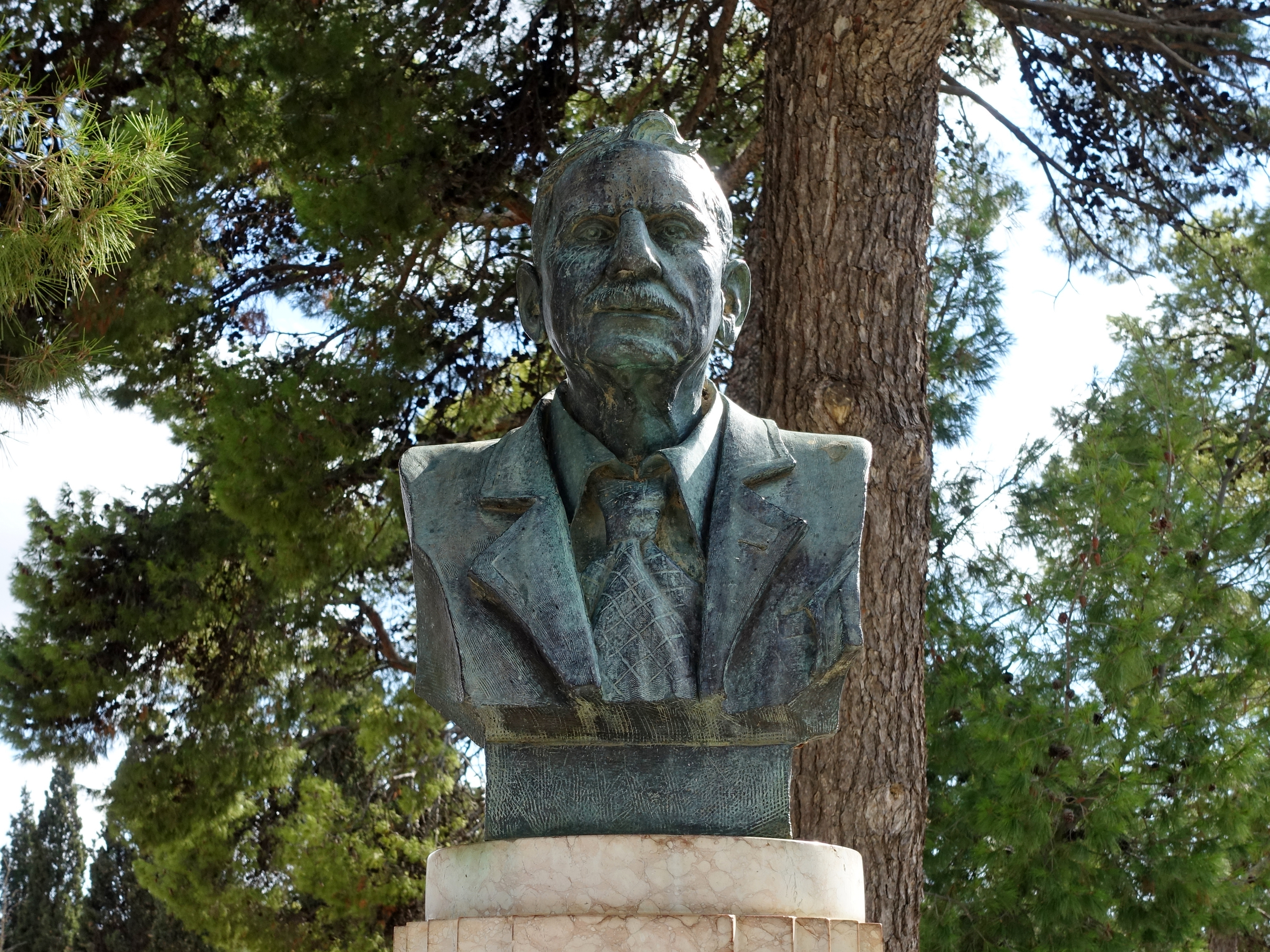
Bronze bust of Evans at Knossos, Crete

Evans was a member and officer of many learned societies, including being elected a Fellow of the Royal Society (FRS) in 1901. He was one of the founding Fellows of the British Academy in 1901. He was elected an International Member of the American Philosophical Society in 1913 and a foreign member of the Royal Netherlands Academy of Arts and Sciences in 1918. He won the Lyell Medal in 1880 and the Copley Medal in 1936. In 1911, Evans was knighted by King George V for his services to archaeology and is commemorated both at Knossos and at the Ashmolean Museum, which holds the largest collection of Minoan artefacts outside Greece. He received an honorary doctorate (D.Litt.) from the University of Dublin in June 1901.

== Other legacies ==
In 1913, he paid £100 to double the amount paid with the studentship in memory of Augustus Wollaston Franks, established jointly by the University of London and the Society of Antiquaries, which was won that year by Mortimer Wheeler.

From 1894 until his death in 1941, Evans lived in his house, Youlbury, which has since been demolished. He had Jarn Mound and its surrounding wild garden built during the Great Depression to make work for local out-of-work labourers. The mound and wild garden, with species from around the world, is now held by the Oxford Preservation Trust.

Evans left part of his estate to the Boy Scouts and Youlbury Camp is still available for their use.

== See also ==
- Flinders Petrie
- Howard Carter
- Leonard Woolley
- Matriarchal religion
- Minoan chronology
- Minoan pottery
- Minoan religion
- Minoan seals
- Minoan snake goddess figurines

== Bibliography ==
=== By Evans ===
- Evans, Arthur John (1871). "On a hoard of coins found at Oxford, with some remarks on the coinage of the first three Edwards". Numismatic Chronicle. New Series (11): 260–282.
- —— (1876). Through Bosnia and the Herzegóvina on foot during the insurrection, August and September 1875; with an historical review of Bosnia and a glimpse at the Croats, Slavonians, and the ancient republic of Ragusa. London: Longmans, Greens and Co. "arthur john evans."
- —— (1877). Through Bosnia and the Herzegdvina on foot, during the insurrection, August and September 1875, with an historical review of Bosnia, and a glimpse at the Croats, Slavonians, and the ancient republic of Ragusa (2nd ed.). London: Longmans, Green and Co.
- —— (1878). Illyrian letters: a revised selection of correspondence from the llllyrian provinces of Bosnia, Herzegdvina, Montenegro, Albania, Dalmatia, Croatia and Slavonia during the troubled year 1877. London: Longmans, Green and Co.
- —— (1883). Antiquarian researches in Illyricum. (Parts I and II). From The Archaeologia Vol. XLVIII. Westminster: Nichols and Sons.
- —— (1884). The Ashmolean museum as a home of archæology in Oxford: an inaugural lecture given in the Ashmolean Museum, November 20, 1884. Oxford: Parker & Co.
- —— (1885). Antiquarian researches in Illyricum, Parts III, IV. Archaeologia. Vol. XLIX. London. pp. 1–167.
- —— (1886). "Megalithic Monuments in their Sepulchral Relation". Transactions of the Lancashire and Cheshire Antiquarian Society. III, 1885. Manchester: A. Ireland Co., Printers.
- —— (1889). "The "horsemen" of Tarentum. A contribution towards the numismatic history of Great Greece. Including an essay on artists', engravers', and magistrates' signatures". Numismatic Chronicle. 3rd Series. 9.
- —— (1890). "On a Late-Celtic urn-field at Aylesford, Kent, and on the Gaulish, Illyro-Italic, and Classical connexions of the forms of pottery and bronzework there discovered". Archaeologia. 52 (2): 315–88. doi:10.1017/S0261340900007591.
- —— (1892). Syracusan "medallions" and their engravers in the light of recent finds, with observations on the chronology and historical occasions of the Syracusan coin-types of the fifth and fourth centuries B.C. And an essay on some new artists' signatures on Sicilian coins (reprinted from the Numismatic Chronicle of 1890 and 1891). London: Bernard Quaritch.
- —— (1894). "Primitive Pictographs and Script from Crete and the Peloponnese". The Journal of Hellenic Studies. XIV: 270–372. doi:10.2307/623973. JSTOR 623973. S2CID 163720432.
- —— (1895). Cretan pictographs and prae-Phoenician script: with an account of a sepulchral deposit at Hagios Onouphrios near Phaestos in its relation to primitive Cretan and Aegean culture. London: Bernard Quaritch.
- —— (1898). Letters from Crete. Repr. from the "Manchester Guardian" of May 24, 25, and June 13, with notes on some official replies to questions asked with reference to the above in the House of Commons. Oxford: Hart.
- —— (1901). "The Mycenaean Pillar Cult and its Mediterranean Relations with Illustrations from Recent Cretan Finds". The Journal of Hellenic Studies. 21: 99–204. doi:10.2307/623870. hdl:2027/uva.x000381934. JSTOR 623870. Archived from the original on 7 March 2016.
- —— (1901). "Minoan Civilization at the Palace of Knosses" (PDF). Monthly Review. Archived from the original (PDF) on 16 June 2013.
- —— (1906) [1905]. Essai de classification des Époques de la civilization minoenne: résumé d'un discours fait au Congrès d'Archéologie à Athènes (Revised ed.). London: B. Quaritch.
- —— (1906). "The prehistoric tombs of Knossos: I. The cemetery of Zapher Papoura, with a comparative note on a chamber-tomb at Milatos. II. The Royal Tomb at Isopata". Archaeologia. 59. London: B. Quaritch: 391–562. doi:10.1017/S0261340900027612.
- —— (1909). Scripta Minoa: The Written Documents of Minoan Crete: with Special Reference to the Archives of Knossos. Vol. I: The Hieroglyphic and Primitive Linear Classes: with an account of the discovery of the pre-Phoenician scripts, their place in the Minoan story and their Mediterranean relatives: with plates, tables and figures in the text. Oxford: Clarendon Press.
- —— (1912). "The Minoan and Mycenaean Element in Hellenic Life". The Journal of Hellenic Studies. 32: 277–287. doi:10.2307/624176. JSTOR 624176. S2CID 163279561.
- —— (1914). "The 'Tomb of the Double Axes' and Associated Group, and the Pillar Rooms and Ritual Vessels of the 'Little Palace' at Knossos". Archaeologia. 65: 1–94. doi:10.1017/S0261340900010833.
- ——. The Palace of Minos: a comparative account of the successive stages of the early Cretan civilization as illustrated by the discoveries at Knossos (1921, 1928A, 1928B, 1930, 1935A, 1935B, 1936). London: MacMillan and Co; Online by Ruprecht-Karls-Universität Heidelberg. Archived from the original on 16 February 2012. [Volume 1, Volume 2 Parts 1&2, Volume 3, Volume 4 Parts 1&2, Index by Joan Evans].
  - —— (1921). PM. Vol. I: The Neolithic and Early and Middle Minoan Ages.
  - —— (1928). PM. Vol. II Part I: Fresh lights on origins and external relations: the restoration in town and palace after seismic catastrophe towards close of M. M. III and the beginnings of the New Era.
  - —— (1928). PM. Vol. II Part II: Town-Houses in Knossos of the New Era and restored West Palace Section, with its state approach.
  - —— (1930). PM. Vol. III: The great transitional age in the northern and eastern sections of the Palace: the most brilliant record of Minoan art and the evidences of an advanced religion.
  - —— (1935). PM. Vol. IV Part I: Emergence of outer western enceinte, with new illustrations, artistic and religious, of the Middle Minoan Phase, Chryselephantine "Lady of Sports", "Snake Room" and full story of the cult Late Minoan ceramic evolution and "Palace Style".
  - —— (1935). PM. Vol. IV Part II: Camp-stool Fresco, long-robed priests and beneficent genii, Chryselephantine Boy-God and ritual hair-offering, Intaglio Types, M.M. III – L. M. II, late hoards of sealings, deposits of inscribed tablets and the palace stores, Linear Script B and its mainland extension, Closing Palatial Phase, Room of Throne and final catastrophe.
  - Evans, Joan (1936). PM. Vol. Index to the Palace of Minos.
- —— (1925). ʻThe ring of Nestor;̓ a glimpse into the Minoan after-world, and a sepulchral treasure of gold signet-rings and bead-seals from Thisbê, Boeotia. London: Macmillan and Co.
- —— (1929). The shaft graves and bee-hive tombs of Mycenae and their interrelation (PDF). London: MacMillan and Co. Archived from the original (PDF) on 20 September 2011.
- —— (1933). Jarn Mound, with its panorama and wild garden of British plants. Oxford: J. Vincent.
- —— (1952). Scripta Minoa: The Written Documents of Minoan Crete: with special reference to the archives of Knossos. Vol. II: The Archives of Knossos: clay tablets inscribed in linear script B: edited from notes, and supplemented by John L. Myres. Oxford: Clarendon Press.

=== About Evans ===
- Brown, Ann Cynthia (1993). Before Knossos: Arthur Evans's Travels in the Balkans and Crete (Illustrated ed.). Ashmolean Museum. ISBN 9781854440297.
- Cottrell, Leonard (1958). The Bull of Minos. New York: Rinehart & Company.
- Fox, Margalit (2013). The Riddle of the Labyrinth: The Quest to Crack an Ancient Code. Ecco. ISBN 978-0062228833.
- Gere, Cathy (2009). Knossos and the Prophets of Modernism. Chicago: The University of Chicago Press. ISBN 978-0-226-28954-0.
- MacGillivray, Joseph Alexander (2000). Minotaur: Sir Arthur Evans and the Archaeology of the Minoan Myth. New York: Hill and Wang (Farrar, Straus and Giroux). ISBN 9780809030354.
