= Oxford Preservation Trust =

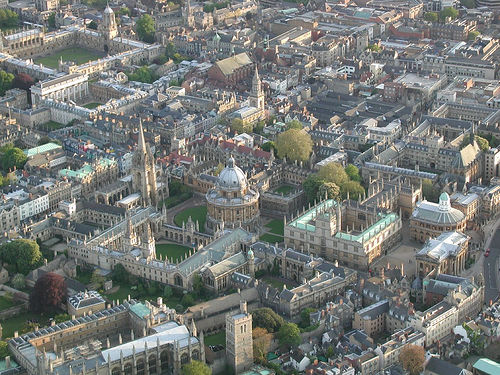
Aerial view of Oxford city centre

The Oxford Preservation Trust is a registered charity established in 1927 to preserve the city of Oxford, England. The Trust seeks to enhance Oxford by encouraging thoughtful development and new design, while protecting historic buildings and green open spaces.

The Trust is run by a board of trustees and an executive committee. It employs six staff including its Chief Executive Officer, Anna Eavis

The Trust organises Oxford Open Doors annually, as well as the OPT Awards (to encourage the best new buildings, conservation projects, landscaping and temporary projects), and it is a member of the Oxfordshire Blue Plaques Board.

== Projects ==
The Trust's notable projects have included the successful conversion in the early 1990s of St George's Tower on the Oxford Castle site into a popular tourist attraction. It has also published reports advising on the redevelopment of parts of Oxford including Broad Street and the former site of the terminus of the Oxford Canal opposite the end of George Street.

The Trust has an ongoing role in preserving Oxford's green belt. To this end it owns several pieces of land at Boars Hill, Harcourt Hill and elsewhere around Oxford such as Jarn Mound. In 2007 and 2008 the Trust successfully opposed the Bodleian Library's proposal to build a new book depository that would have obstructed a view from Boar's Hill of Oxford's skyline that the poet Matthew Arnold (1822–1888) called the city's "dreaming spires".

== Chairmen ==
During its history OPT has been chaired by a number of prominent academic and other figures. Several have chaired OPT at the same time as being vice-chancellor of the University of Oxford.

- Herbert Fisher (1927–35)
- Professor Sandie Lindsay (1935–38)
- Professor G.S. Gordon (1939–41)
- Sir David Ross (1941–44)
- Sir Richard Livingstone (1944–47)
- Dr. William Stallybrass (1947–49)
- Very Rev. John Lowe (1949–51)
- Sir Maurice Bowra (1951–54)
- A.H. Smith (1955–56)
- Rt. Hon. Lord Salter (1957–59)
- William Harcourt, 2nd Viscount Harcourt (1959–79)
- David Hennessy, 3rd Baron Windlesham (1979–89)
- Professor Sir David Yardley (1989–2009)
- Professor Roger Ainsworth (2009–2017)
- Revd Professor William Whyte (2017– )

== Secretaries ==
Some of OPT's Secretaries have also been prominent academic or other figures:

- Miss H.E. Fitzrandolph (1936–45)
- John Betjeman (1946–49)
- Sam Smith, JP (1949–58)
- Sir Douglas Veale (1958–62)
- Ivan Lloyd-Phillips (1962–66)
- R.W.S. Malcolm (1966–78)
- Alderman Frank Pickstock (1978–82)
- Mrs. Helen Turner (1982–90)
- Mrs. Moyra Haynes (1990–98)
- Mrs. Debbie Dance (1998–2023)
- Anna Eavis (2024- )

== See also ==
- Oxford Civic Society
