= The Painted Room =

Historic site in Oxford, England

Coordinates: 51°45′08″N 1°15′27″W

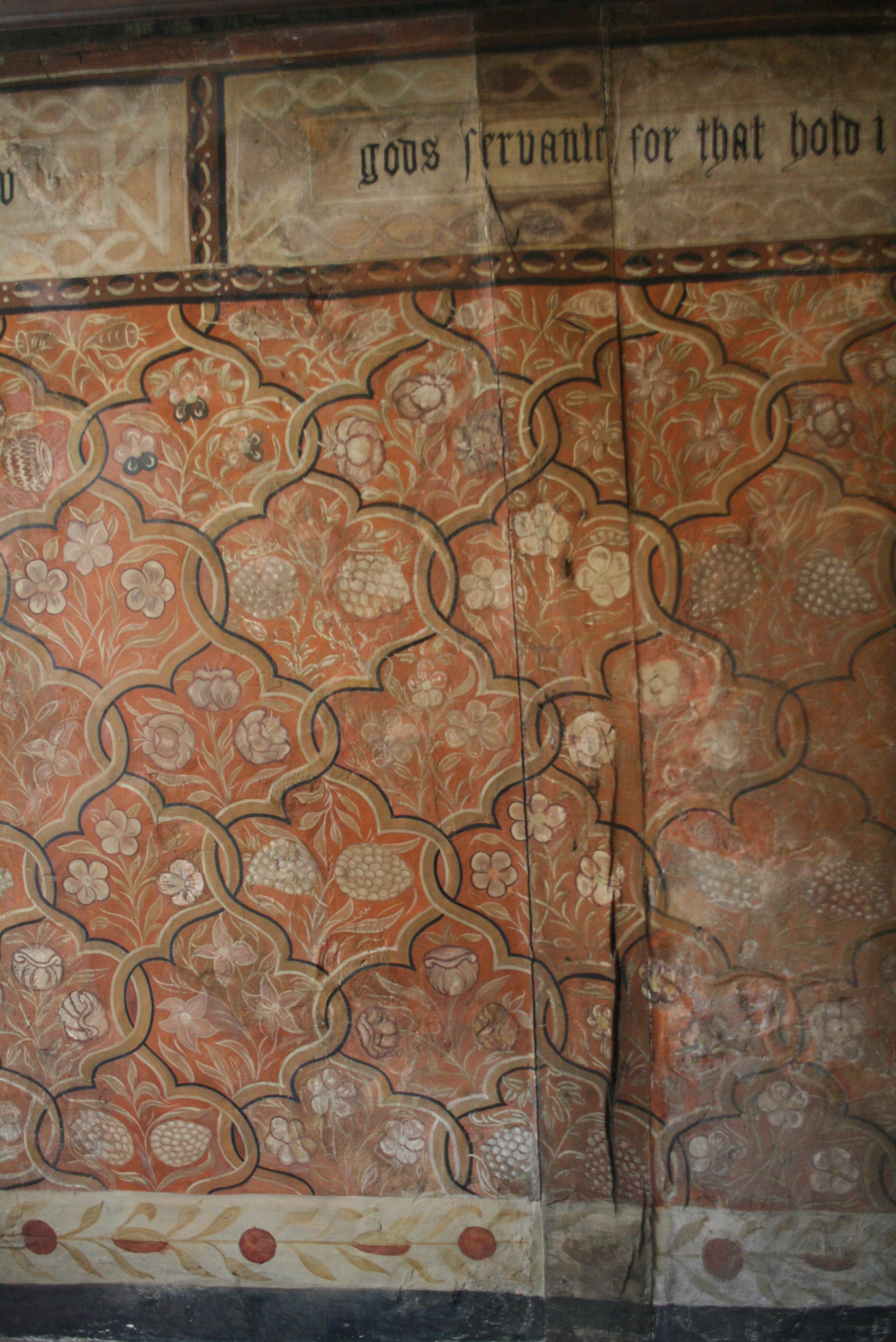
- Decorative wall painting in The Painted Room.

Site notes
- Discovered: 1927
- Governing body: Oxford Preservation Trust

The Painted Room is a medieval heritage site located in Oxford, England. It consist in a timber-framed room dating from the 1560s or 1570s, with its wall painting preserved. It is located at 3 Cornmarket Street, and managed by the Oxford Preservation Trust.

In around 1600, the paintings that decorate the room were concealed behind wooden panels, and only rediscovered 300 years later, in 1927.

The wooden frieze has the following inscription:

First of thi risyng
And last of the rest be thou
gods servant for that hold i best
In the mornynge earlye
serve god Devoutlie
Fear god above allthynge
...... honour the kynge
