= Charles Sampson =

Charles Sampson may refer to:

- Charlie Sampson (born 1957), American bull rider
- Charles Sampson (footballer) (born 1980), Ghanaian international footballer
- Charles Henry Sampson, principal of Brasenose College, Oxford
