= Maurice Bowra =

English classical scholar, literary critic and academic (1898–1971)

Sir Cecil Maurice Bowra CH FBA
- Maurice Bowra being shown a computer in 1965

Vice-Chancellor of the University of Oxford
- In office 1951–1954
- Preceded by: John Lowe
- Succeeded by: Alic Halford Smith

Personal details
- Born: 8 April 1898 Jiujiang, China
- Died: 4 July 1971 (aged 73) Oxford, England
- Education: New College, Oxford
- Military career
- Allegiance: United Kingdom
- Branch: British Army
- Service years: 1917–1918
- Units: Royal Field Artillery
- Conflicts: First World War: Third Battle of Ypres; Battle of Cambrai (1917); Ludendorff Offensive

Sir Cecil Maurice Bowra (/ˈbaʊrə/; 8 April 1898 – 4 July 1971) was an English classical scholar, literary critic and academic, known for his wit. He was Warden of Wadham College, Oxford, from 1938 to 1970, and served as vice-chancellor of the University of Oxford from 1951 to 1954.

== Early life and education ==
=== Birth and boyhood ===
Bowra was born in Jiujiang, China, to English parents. His father, Cecil Arthur Verner Bowra (1869–1947), who worked for the Chinese Imperial Maritime Customs, had been born in Ningbo, and his paternal grandfather, Edward Charles Bowra, had also worked for the Chinese Customs, after serving in the Ever Victorious Army under "Chinese Gordon". Soon after Bowra's birth his father was transferred to the treaty port of Niuzhuang, and the family lived there for the first five years of Bowra's life, except during the Boxer Rebellion, in the summer of 1900, when Bowra was evacuated to Japan along with his mother, his elder brother, Edward, and other women and children of the European community.

The family returned to Britain in 1903, travelling via Japan and the United States, and settled in the Kent countryside. Bowra later said he had been fluent in Mandarin, but forgot the language after settling in Britain. Bowra's parents went back to China in February 1905, leaving their children in the care of their paternal grandmother, who, having been widowed, lived with her second husband, a clergyman, in Putney. During this time the boys received tuition from Ella Dell, sister of the writer Ethel M. Dell. The boys also attended a preparatory school in Putney, where Maurice came first in all classes except arithmetic. During his time at this school Bowra began his classical education with lessons from Cecil Botting, a master at St Paul's School and father of the writer Antonia White.

In 1909 the Bowra brothers journeyed across Europe and Russia by train to visit their parents in Mukden. They also visited the site of the Battle of Mukden and encountered Lord Kitchener. Their return journey, which they made in the company of their father, took them through Hong Kong, Colombo, Suez, Naples and Algiers.

=== Cheltenham College ===
Bowra boarded at Cheltenham College from April 1910. He did not enjoy such features of the school as outdoor games or the OTC, but he won a scholarship in the internal exams held in June 1911. It became clear that he had a particular aptitude for classics, for which the school laid a thorough grounding in Greek and Latin. During his final two years, in the sixth form, Bowra became bored with his school work, acquired sufficient French to read Verlaine and Baudelaire, studied a bilingual edition of Dante's Divina Commedia, and began to learn German. Bowra maintained a connection with the school in later life, being instrumental in the appointment of Cecil Day-Lewis as a master there and serving on its governing body from 1943 to 1965.

== World War I ==
By 1916 Bowra's father was Chief Secretary of the Chinese Customs and resided in Beijing in a household with thirty servants. In January that year Bowra's mother came to England to visit her sons, who were both about to see active service in the Army. In May Bowra departed with his mother for China, travelling through Norway, Sweden and Russia. In Beijing he visited the Great Wall of China and the Ming Tombs, and witnessed the funeral of Yuan Shikai.

Bowra departed from Beijing in September and on his way home spent three weeks in St Petersburg (then called Petrograd) as a guest of Robert Wilton. During this time he attained a working knowledge of Russian and attended operas in which Feodor Chaliapin performed.

After his return to Britain he began training with the OTC in Oxford before being called up and sent to the Royal Army Cadet School in March 1917. He served in the Royal Field Artillery on active service in France from September 1917. He saw action at Passchendaele and Cambrai, and in 1918 he participated in the resistance to the Ludendorff Offensive and the Allied counter-offensive. During this time he continued to read widely, including both contemporary poets and Greek and Latin authors.

Bowra was left with a lifelong hatred of war and military strategists, and seldom mentioned the war afterwards. He later told Cyril Connolly, "Whatever you hear about the war, remember it was far worse: inconceivably bloody – nobody who wasn't there can imagine what it was like." Anthony Powell wrote that Bowra's wartime experiences "played a profound part in his thoughts and inner life", and records that when a cruise ship they were travelling on held a ceremony to place a wreath in the sea as it passed the Dardanelles Bowra was so affected that he retired to his cabin. Following the Second World War he was accommodating to returning servicemen who wished to study at Oxford, telling one applicant who was worried about his deficiency in Latin, "No matter, war service counts as Latin."

== Undergraduate years ==
In 1919 Bowra took up a scholarship he had won to New College, Oxford. He took a first class in Honour Moderations in 1920 and a first class, with formal congratulations, in Literae Humaniores in 1922. Bowra was very sociable as an undergraduate, and his circle included Cyril Radcliffe (with whom he shared lodgings), Roy Harrod, Robert Boothby, L. P. Hartley, Lord David Cecil, J. B. S. Haldane and Christopher Hollis. He also became a friend of Dadie Rylands. The teachers who influenced him included Gilbert Murray and Alic Smith. The treatment he received from one of his tutors in philosophy, H. W. B. Joseph, was said by Isaiah Berlin to have "undermined his faith in his own intellectual capacity".

== Academic career ==
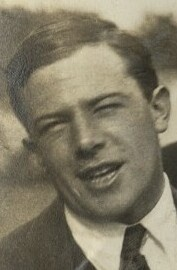
Maurice Bowra in the 1920s

In 1922 Bowra was elected a fellow of Wadham College, Oxford, with the support of the Regius Professor of Greek, Gilbert Murray, and appointed Dean of Wadham shortly afterwards. When Murray vacated his chair in 1936 Bowra and others believed that Bowra himself was most likely to succeed him, but Murray recommended E. R. Dodds as his successor, rejecting Bowra because of "a certain lack of quality, precision and reality in his scholarship as a whole". Some believed that the real reason was a whispering campaign over Bowra's "real or imagined homosexuality".

Bowra became a Doctor of Letters of the University of Oxford in 1937. In 1938 the Wardenship of Wadham fell vacant and Bowra, still the Dean, was elected to the post, keeping it until 1970 (when he was succeeded by Stuart Hampshire). Bowra was supported in the election by his colleague Frederick Lindemann. Lindemann had initially opposed Bowra's election as a fellow of Wadham, proposing that a scientist should be preferred, but had warmed to Bowra because of his vociferous opposition to the Nazi regime in Germany and the policy of appeasement. The election was held on 5 October 1938, and coincided with the Oxford by-election campaign, in which Bowra lent his support to the anti-appeasement candidate, Sandy Lindsay.

During the Second World War Bowra served in the Oxford Home Guard and was not offered any war work. When Berlin canvassed to find Bowra a position the file was sent back to him stamped "unreliable".

Bowra was Professor of Poetry at Oxford from 1946 to 1951. He wrote of the election for the post that "The campaign was very enjoyable and C. S. Lewis was outmanoeuvred so completely that he even failed in the end to be nominated, and I walked over without opposition. Very gratifying to a vain man like myself."

Bowra spent the academic year 1948–49 at Harvard as the Charles Eliot Norton Professor of Poetry and gave the 1955 Andrew Lang lecture. He delivered the 1957 Earl Grey Lecture in Newcastle on "The Meaning of a Heroic Age" and the 1963 Taylorian Lecture on "Poetry and the First World War". In 1966 he gave the Romanes Lecture.

Bowra was at Harvard when the post of vice-chancellor fell unexpectedly vacant in 1948, on the sudden accidental death of William Stallybrass. When the most senior head of house, J. R. H. Weaver, declined the post, Bowra could have succeeded to it, but he chose to stay in the United States and Dean Lowe filled the post until 1951, when Bowra served his three-year term. As chair of the Hebdomadal Council he dealt with the business of meetings that customarily occupied a whole afternoon in as little as fifteen minutes. When T. S. R. Boase was indisposed by an eye problem in 1959 Bowra returned to chair the committee and privately remarked that "jokes about his beaux yeux are not thought funny".

Bowra was President of the British Academy from 1958 to 1962. His tenure was marked by two achievements: he chaired the committee that produced the Report on Research in the Humanities and the Social Sciences, which resulted in a grant for those purposes from HM Treasury; and he helped to establish the British Institute of Persian Studies in Tehran.

In his long career as an Oxford don Bowra had contact with a considerable portion of the English literary world, either as students or as colleagues. The character of Mr Samgrass in Evelyn Waugh's Brideshead Revisited is said to have been modelled on Bowra. Cyril Connolly, Henry Green, Anthony Powell and Kenneth Clark knew Bowra quite well when they were undergraduates. Clark called Bowra "the strongest influence in my life". Waugh marked his friend's election as Warden of Wadham by presenting him with a monkey-puzzle tree for his garden.

John Betjeman recorded his appreciation of Bowra in his verse autobiography Summoned by Bells, in which he evokes an evening spent dining with Bowra in a passage that concludes: "I wandered back to Magdalen, certain then,/ As now, that Maurice Bowra's company / Taught me far more than all my tutors did."

Though he was not in any sense religious, Bowra signed the petition (in favour of the Tridentine Catholic Mass) that became informally known as the Agatha Christie indult and regularly attended the Church of England services in his college's chapel.

== Verse ==
Bowra had learned the value of verse during the First World War. Cyril Connolly wrote that Bowra "saw human life as a tragedy in which great poets were the heroes who fought back and tried to give life a meaning". Bowra was an important champion of Boris Pasternak, lecturing on his work and nominating him repeatedly for the Nobel Prize in Literature.

However, Bowra was never able to fulfil his wish to be accepted as a serious poet himself. His output consisted of "sharp satires, in verse, on his friends (and sharper still on his enemies)". His friend and literary executor, John Sparrow, once commented that Bowra had cut himself off from posterity "as his prose was unreadable and his verse was unprintable". This was set half-right by the publication in 2005 of New Bats in Old Belfries, a collection of satires on friends and enemies written between the 1920s and the 1960s. Bowra wrote a satire on John Betjeman, who had become choked with emotion on being presented by Princess Margaret with the Duff Cooper Prize on 18 December 1958. The judges on that occasion were Lord David Cecil, Harold Nicolson and Bowra himself as chairman. Duff Cooper's widow Lady Diana Cooper observed that "Poor Betch was crying and too moved to find an apology for words." (Philip Ziegler, Diana Cooper: The Biography of Lady Diana Cooper, Hamish Hamilton 1981, p. 310.)

Green with lust and sick with shyness,

Let me lick your lacquered toes.
Gosh, oh gosh, your Royal Highness,
Put your finger up my nose,
Pin my teeth upon your dress,
Plant my head with watercress.
Only you can make me happy.
Tuck me tight beneath your arm.
Wrap me in a woollen nappy;
Let me wet it till it's warm.
In a plush and plated pram
Wheel me round St James's, Ma'am.
Let your sleek and soft galoshes
Slide and slither on my skin.
Swaddle me in mackintoshes
Till I lose my sense of sin.
Lightly plant your plimsolled heel

Where my privy parts congeal.

The Telegraph, echoing Cecil Day-Lewis on the man himself, warned that the book, like strychnine, was best taken in small doses.

Two poems on Patrick Leigh Fermor were omitted from the book, in deference to their subject's wishes, but were published after his death in the Wadham Gazette in December 2011.

== Sexuality ==
Bowra was homosexual. As an undergraduate in Oxford in the 1920s, Bowra was known to cruise for sex. He used the term "the Homintern" and privately referred to his leading position in it, also calling it "the Immoral Front" or "the 69th International".

== Retirement and death ==
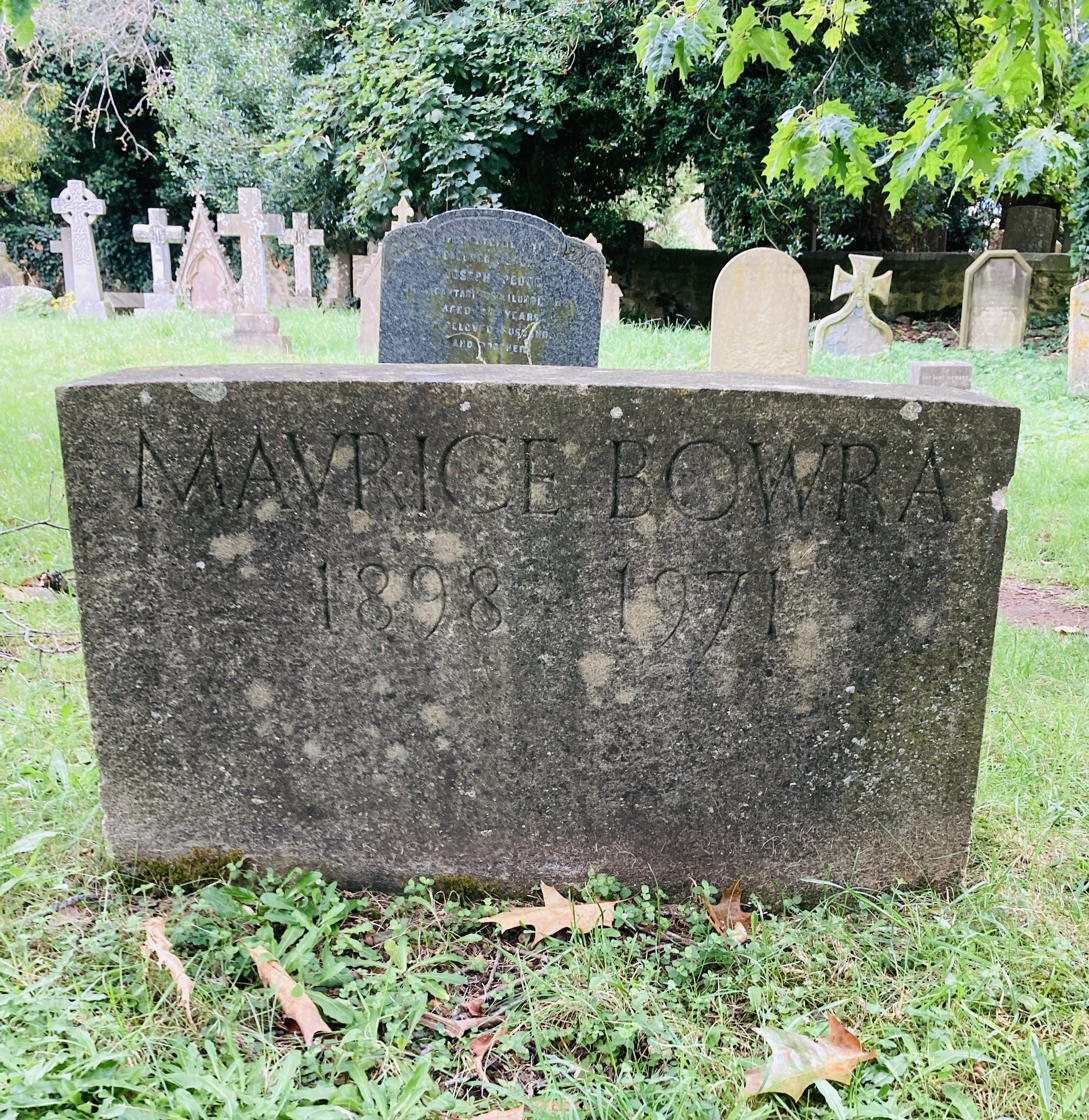
The grave of Maurice Bowra in Holywell Cemetery in Oxford in 2024

Bowra retired in 1970, but continued to live in rooms in the college that had been granted to him in exchange for a house he owned. He became an honorary fellow of Wadham and was awarded the honorary degree of Doctor of Civil Law. He died of a sudden heart attack in 1971 and his cremated remains were buried in Holywell Cemetery, Oxford.

== Honours ==
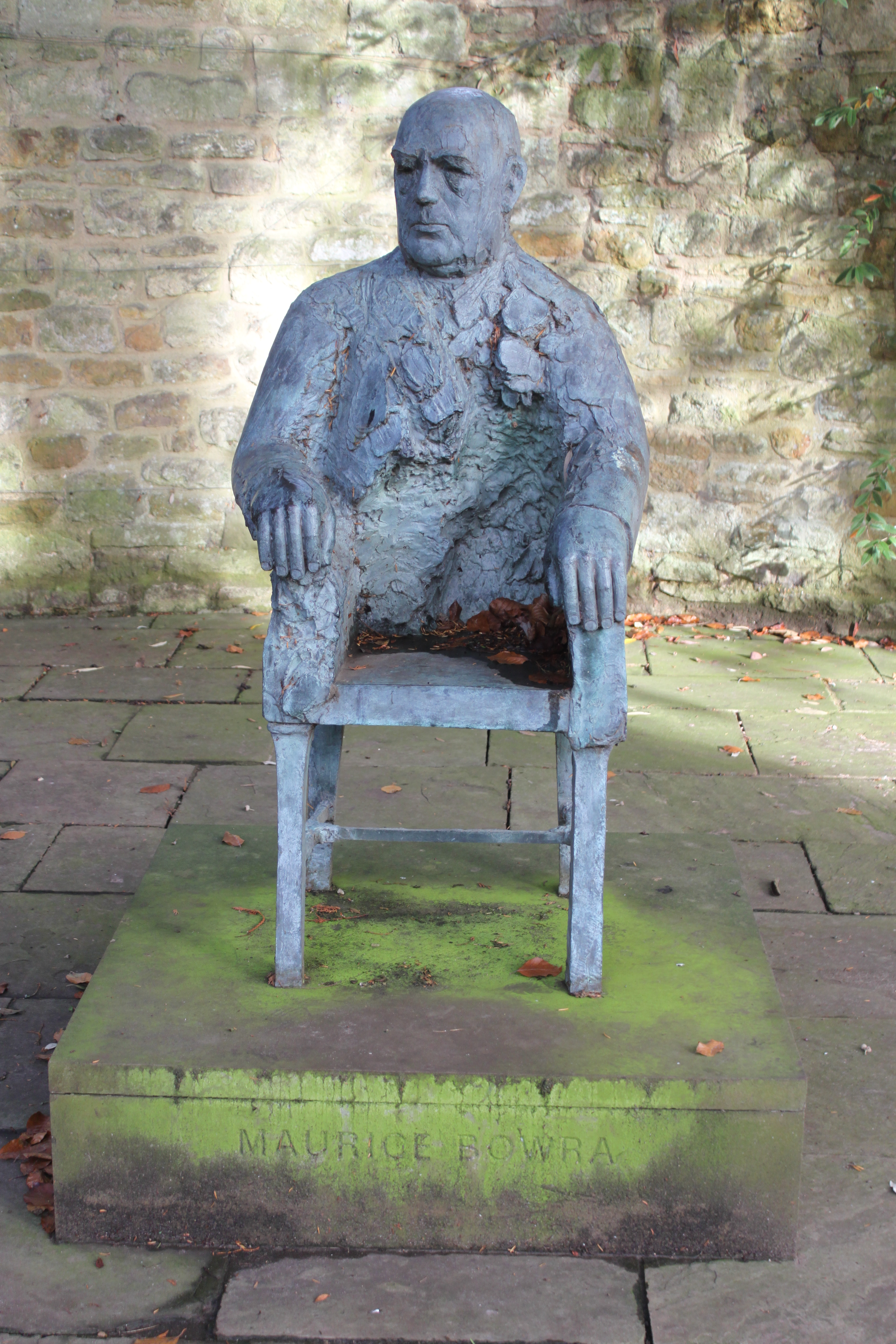
A sculpture of Bowra in Wadham College, Oxford

In addition to his Oxford degrees, Bowra received honorary doctorates from the universities of Dublin, Hull, Wales, Harvard, Columbia, St Andrews, Paris and Aix.

Bowra was knighted in 1951 and was appointed a Member of the Order of the Companions of Honour in 1971. He was also a Commandeur of the Legion of Honour in France, a Knight Commander of the Royal Order of the Phoenix in Greece and a recipient of the order "Pour le Mérite" in West Germany.

In 1992 Wadham College named its new Bowra Building in his honour.

== Quotations ==
- "Buggers can't be choosers" (explaining his engagement, later called off, to a "plain" woman, poet and Somerville alumna Audrey Beecham, niece of the conductor)
- "I am a man more dined against than dining" (parodying King Lear's "more sinned against than sinning")
- "Buggery was invented to fill that awkward hour between Evensong and cocktails" or was "useful for filling that awkward time between tea and cocktails"
- "Splendid couple—slept with both of them" (on hearing of the engagement of a well-known literary pair)
- "Though like Our Lord and Socrates he does not publish much, he thinks and says a great deal and has had an enormous influence on our times" (about Isaiah Berlin)
- "I don't know about you, gentlemen, but in Oxford I, at least, am known by my face" (allegedly after being observed bathing naked at Parson's Pleasure and covering his face rather than his privates)
- "Where there's death, there's hope."
- When asked by an undergraduate for help with translating a passage by Apollinaire, whom Bowra had met whilst in France during the First World War: "Can't help you. Pity. Slept with him once—should have asked him then."

== Bibliography ==
- Pindar's Pythian Odes (1928), co-translator with H. T. Wade-Gery
- The Oxford Book of Greek Verse (1930), co-editor with Gilbert Murray, Cyril Bailey, E. A. Barber and T. F. Higham
- Tradition and Design in the Iliad (1930)
- Ancient Greek Literature (1933)
- Pindari Carmina (1935; 2nd edition 1947)
- Greek Lyric Poetry: From Alcman to Simonides (Oxford 1936, 2nd revision 2001)
- The Oxford Book of Greek Poetry in Translation (1937), co-editor with T. F. Higham
- Early Greek Elegists (1938), the Martin Lectures at Oberlin College
- The Heritage of Symbolism (1943)
- A Book of Russian Verse (1943), editor (a collection of translations, none by Bowra)
- Sophoclean Tragedy (1944)
- From Virgil to Milton (1945)
- A Second Book of Russian Verse (1948) editor (a collection of translations, none by Bowra)
- The Creative Experiment (1949)
- The Romantic Imagination (1950) Review/summary.
- Heroic Poetry (1952)
- Problems in Greek Poetry (1953)
- Inspiration and Poetry (1955)
- Homer and His Forerunners (Thomas Nelson, 1955)
- The Greek Experience (1957)
- Primitive Song (1962)
- In General and Particular (1964)
- Pindar (1964)
- Classical Greece (1965)
- Landmarks in Greek Literature (1966)
- Poetry and Politics, 1900–1960 (1966), the Wiles Lectures at the Queen's University, Belfast
- Memories 1898–1939 (1966)
- The Odes of Pindar (1969, reissued 1982), translator
- On Greek Margins (1970)
- Periclean Athens (1971)
- Homer (1972)
- New Bats in Old Belfries, or Some Loose Tiles (2005), ed. Henry Hardy and Jennifer Holmes, with an introduction by Julian Mitchell

Bowra also wrote a foreword to Voices From the Past: A Classical Anthology for the Modern Reader, ed. James and Janet Maclean Todd (1955), as well as forewords to other works.

== Notes ==
Academic offices
Preceded by John Frederick Stenning	Warden of Wadham College, Oxford; 1938–1970	Succeeded by Stuart Hampshire
Preceded by The Very Reverend John Lowe	Vice-Chancellor of Oxford University; 1951–1954	Succeeded by Alic Halford Smith
