= Charles Drury Edward Fortnum =

English art collector and art historian

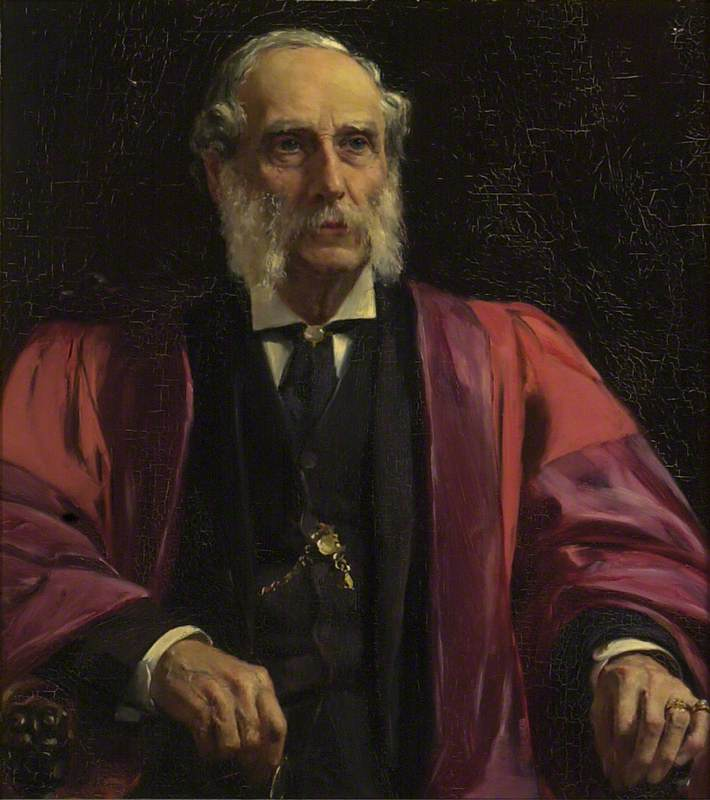
- Born: 2 March 1820
- Died: 6 March 1899 (aged 79)
- Burial place: Highgate Cemetery
- Known for: Ashmolean Museum

Charles Drury Edward Fortnum (1820–1899), often known as C. Drury E. Fortnum, was an English art collector and historian, known as a benefactor of the University of Oxford.

== Life ==
Born on 2 March 1820, Fortnum was the surviving son of Charles Fortnum (1770–1860), by his wife Laetitia (née Stevens), widow of Robert Basden of the Royal Navy. Considered to have delicate health, he was privately educated.

In 1840 Fortnum went to South Australia, where he acquired a cattle ranch. He discovered the Montacute copper mine in the Mount Lofty Ranges, ten miles from Adelaide, but made no profit from it. Leaving Australia in 1845, he travelled in Europe, mainly engaged in collecting works of art. On settling in England he became known as an authority. In 1858 he was elected a fellow of the Society of Antiquaries of London; and in 1889 a trustee of the British Museum.

Fortnum was an alderman of Middlesex County Council, and a deputy-lieutenant of the county. He was vice-president of the Society of Antiquaries of London and of the Royal Archæological Institute. He died without issue at his residence, the Hill House, Stanmore, Middlesex, on 6 March 1899, and was buried in the Fortnum family vault on the west side of Highgate Cemetery on 11 March.

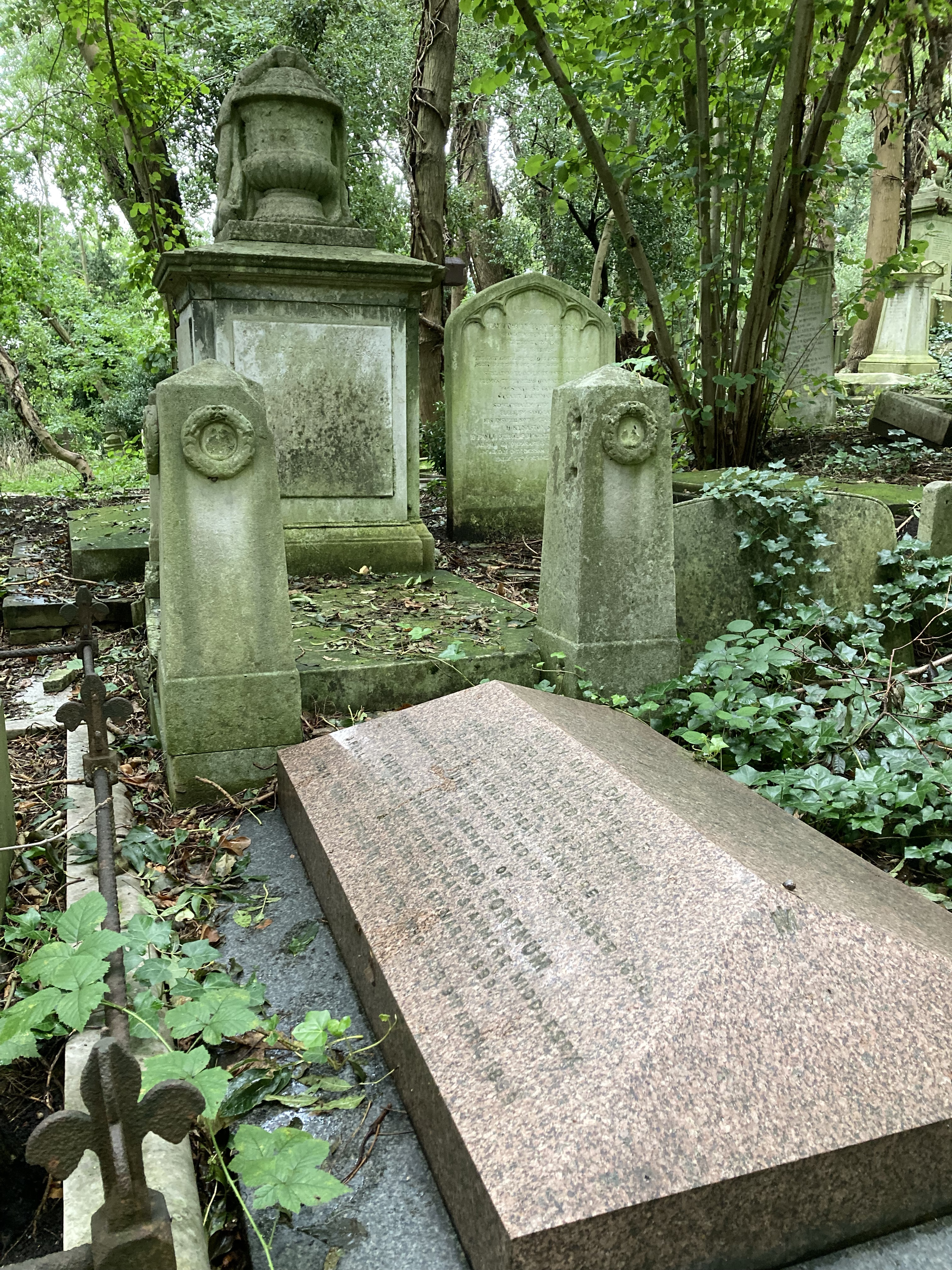
The Fortnum family vault in Highgate Cemetery

== Collector ==
Fortnum formed a collection of Australian insects, birds, and reptiles, a number of which he presented to the British Museum, while others went the Hope collection at Oxford. He studied European art history, and appreciated the applied arts of the Italian Renaissance, before John Ruskin had made the area fashionable. His collections included majolica, Hispano-Moresque ware, Luca Della Robbia and bronzes.

== Benefactions ==
Fortnum has been regarded as the second founder of the Ashmolean Museum. The collections of Elias Ashmole and John Tradescant the younger were awkwardly stored in a building on Broad Street, Oxford. Fortnum was impressed by the efforts of Arthur John Evans to arrange and display the collections. He offered the University of Oxford Renaissance objects, and property for the endowment of the museum, on condition that new buildings were erected to accommodate the collections. After some initial opposition, his offer was accepted, with details settled in 1892. Rooms were added to the university galleries in Beaumont Street, and the Ashmolean collections moved there in 1897. His own collections were presented in 1888, and in the following year he received the honorary degree of D.C.L. from the university.

Fortnum left a substantial sum to the University of Oxford for the Ashmolean Museum, and a smaller amount to the British Museum.

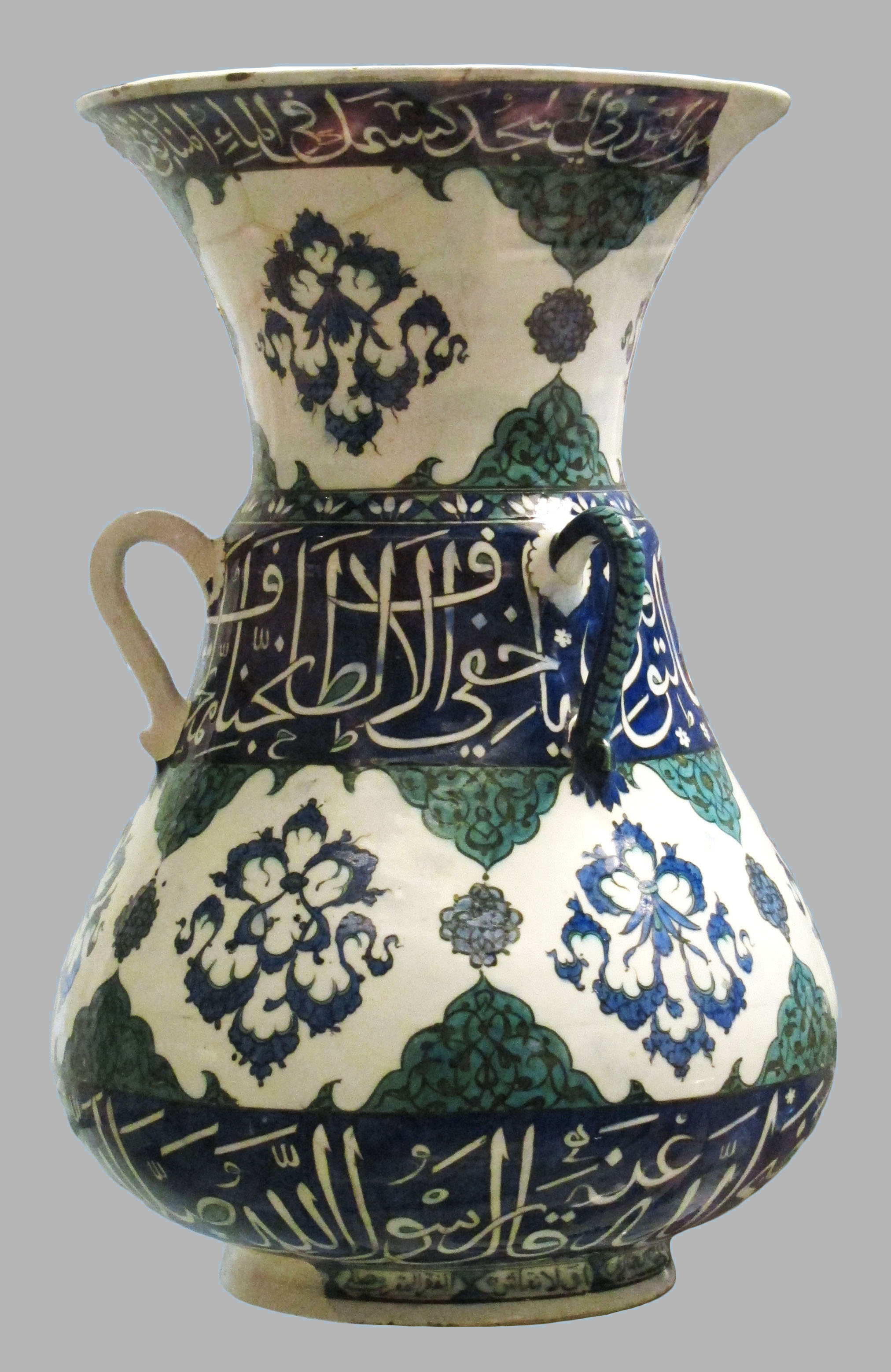
Iznik mosque lamp, dated 1549, donated to the British Museum by Charles Drury Edward Fortnum

== Works ==
For the Council on Education Fortnum wrote the Descriptive Catalogue of the Maiolica, Hispano-Moresco, Persian, Damascus, and Rhodian Wares in the South Kensington Museum (1873), and the Descriptive Catalogue of Bronzes of European Origin (1876) in the South Kensington Museum, published in 1876. He also published:

- Maiolica. A historical Treatise on the glazed and enamelled Earthenwares of Italy, with Marks and Monograms; also some notice of the Persian, Damascus, Rhodian, and Hispano-Moresque Wares, Oxford, 1896.
- A Descriptive Catalogue of the Maiolica and Enamelled Earthenware of Italy, the Persian, Damascus, Rhodian, Hispano-Moresque, and some French and other Wares in the Ashmolean Museum, Fortnum Collection, Oxford, 1897.

He contributed to Archæologia on early Christian gems and rings, and on the royal collection of gems, including the diamond signet of Queen Henrietta Maria, which he presented to Queen Victoria in 1887.

== Family ==
Fortnum was twice married:

- first, on 7 March 1848, to Fanny Matilda (d. 1890), daughter of Thomas Keats;
- secondly, on 27 October 1891, to his cousin Mary, only child and heiress of Charles Fortnum (d. 1845), captain in the 1st Royals.

His widow, Mary, survived him about a month, dying on 9 April 1899.

== Notes ==
Attribution

This article incorporates text from a publication now in the public domain: Lee, Sidney, ed. (1901). "Fortnum, Charles Drury Edward". Dictionary of National Biography (1st supplement). Vol. 2. London: Smith, Elder & Co.
