= Jarn Mound =

Scenic viewpoint

Coordinates: 51.71691°N 1.29741°W

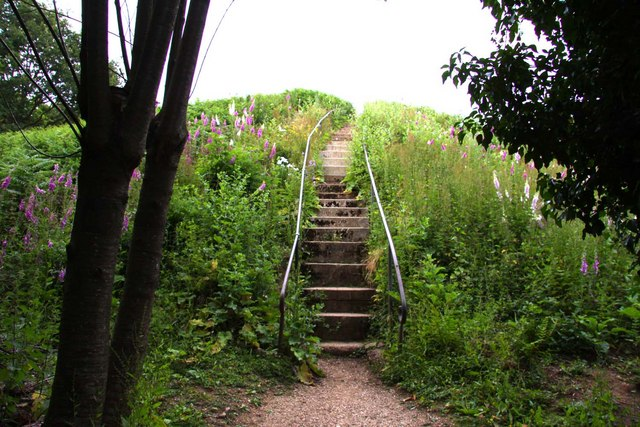
The steps to the summit

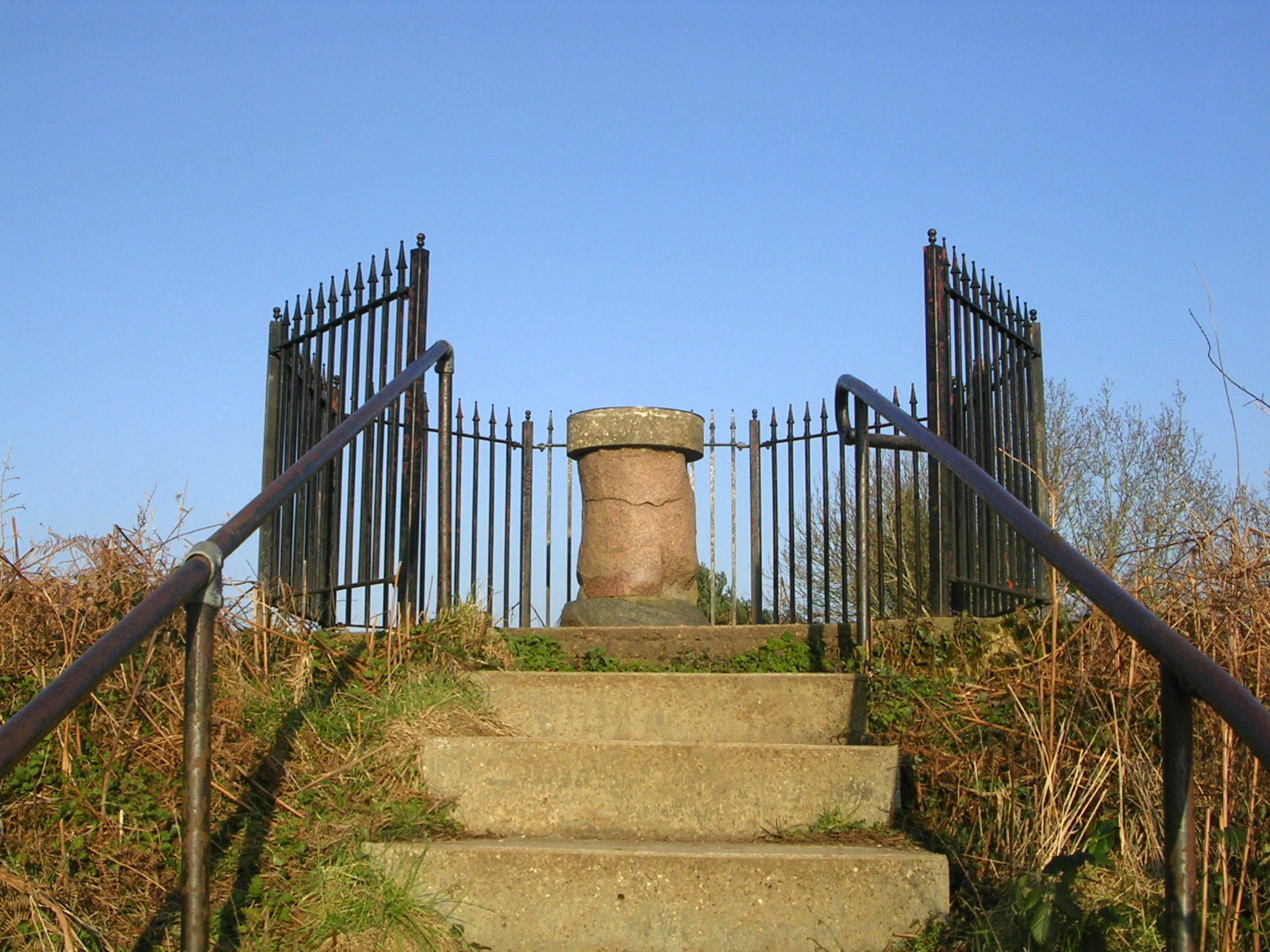
The summit had a topograph on its plinth but this has been vandalised.

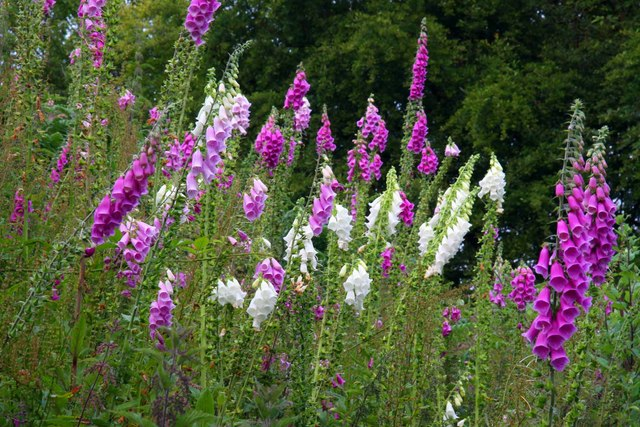
Foxgloves in the wild garden around the mound

Jarn Mound is a mound on Boars Hill which was completed in 1931. It was commissioned by Sir Arthur Evans to provide and preserve the view of the "dreaming spires" of Oxford and the surroundings which the poet Matthew Arnold had immortalised in his poem Thyrsis in 1865.

Jarn is a traditional name for the western side of Boars Hill in the nearby village of Wootton.

== View ==
The mound was designed by Sir Arthur Evans to provide a view of Oxford as described by Matthew Arnold in his poem, Thyrsis, "that sweet city with her dreaming spires". A focus of the poem is a lonely elm tree on top of the hill, "the signal elm, that looks down on Ilsley Downs ... that single elm-tree bright against the West ... bare on its lonely ridge, the Tree! the Tree!" The views which could be had from that tree in the 1850s were reproduced by the views from the top of Jarn Mound when it was constructed. These included Ilsley Down, the Vale of the White Horse, the Upper Thames Valley and its weirs in the west. Views of such picturesque landscapes were popularised by the romantic movement which provided the cultural background for such projects.

== Construction ==
The conical mound is about 50 feet high and 530 feet in circumference at the base. It was constructed in 34 months by a team of 20 labourers using small railway trucks and a tower crane. A wild garden was constructed around the mound using a variety of soils and plants and furnished with stone benches. An adjacent field and heath were also bought to form part of the Jarn project which is now maintained by the Oxford Preservation Trust. Evans financed all this with his personal wealth and then wrote a 45-page booklet about the work – Jarn Mound With Its Panorama and Wild Garden of British Plants – which was published by Joseph Vincent in 1933.

== Maintenance ==
The summit of Boars Hill was quite open and the mound was intended to prevent housing development, which would have affected the view. But the view is now mostly obstructed by many trees which have matured since the construction. The garden around the mound was also neglected and became overgrown with brambles and spindle. In 2016, a volunteer group – Abingdon Green Gym – started to help maintain the site by clearing such brush and cutting down trees.

== See also ==
- King Henry's Mound, which provides a protected view of the Thames Valley and St Paul's Cathedral
