= Leonard Cottrell =

Leonard Eric Cottrell (21 May 1913 – 6 October 1974) was a British author and journalist. Many of his books were popularisations of the archaeology of ancient Egypt.

== Details ==
Leonard Cottrell was born 21 May 1913 at Tettenhall, Wolverhampton to William and Beatrice Cottrell (née Tootell). His father inspired an interest in history at the age of ten. At King Edward's Grammar School, Birmingham, Leonard was only interested in history and English, reading widely.

In the 1930s, Cottrell toured the English countryside on his motorcycle, visiting prehistoric stone circles, burial mounds of the Bronze Age, medieval and Renaissance monuments. On those journeys, he was often accompanied by Doris Swain, whom he later married, although the marriage was dissolved in 1962. After gaining experience writing articles on historical subjects for motoring magazines, he wrote his first documentary for the British Broadcasting Corporation (BBC) in 1937.

Leonard was rejected by the RAF during World War II, for medical reasons, but he joined the BBC in 1942 and they stationed him, in 1944, in the Mediterranean with the RAF as a war correspondent. In 1946 Cottrell produced a dramatised documentary on the experiences of Harold Osmond Le Druillenec, a Jersey schoolmaster who was the only British survivor of Bergen-Belsen concentration camp. Cottrell's experiences as a war correspondent formed the basis of his book All Men are Neighbours (1947). He worked at the BBC until 1960, when he resigned and moved to a house overlooking the estuary of the River Kent in Westmoreland, Cumbria, where he stayed for the rest of his life, writing.

Among other achievements, Cottrell was the editor of the Concise Encyclopaedia of Archaeology (1960).

He was married and divorced twice, first to Doris Swain (divorced 1962) and Diana Bonakis (married 1965; divorced 1968). He had no children by either marriage.

Leonard Cottrell died on 6 October 1974.

== Books ==
- All Men are Neighbours (1947)
- The Lost Pharaohs: The Romance of Egyptian Archaeology (1950)
- Madame Tussaud (1951)
- The Bull of Minos (1953) - the discoveries of Schliemann and Evans
- One Man's Journey (1955)
- Life Under The Pharaohs (1955)
- The Mountains of Pharaoh: 2,000 Years of Pyramid Exploration (1956)
- Seeing Roman Britain (1956)
- Lost Cities (1957)
- The Anvil of Civilisation (1957)
- The Great Invasion (1958)
- Wonders of the World (1959)
- Wonders of Antiquity (1960)
- The Concise Encyclopedia of Archaeology (1960)
- Land of the Pharaohs (1960)
- Enemy of Rome (1960)
  - (US ed.) Hannibal: Enemy of Rome (1961)
- The Tiger of Chʻin: The Dramatic Emergence of China as a Nation (1962)
- Land of the Two Rivers (1962)
- The Lion Gate: A Journey in Search of the Mycenaeans (1963)
  - (US ed.) Realms of Gold: A Journey in Search of the Mycenaeans (1963)
- Digs and Diggers: A Book of World Archaeology (1964)
- The Secrets of Tutankhamen's Tomb (1964)
- The Roman Forts of the Saxon Shore (1964)
- Crete: Island of Mystery (1965)
- The Land of Shinar (1965)
  - (US ed.) The Quest for Sumer (1965)
- Egypt (1965)
- A Guide to Roman Britain (1966)
- Great Leaders of Greece and Rome (1966)
- Lady of the Two Lands: Five Queens of Ancient Egypt (1967)
- The Warrior Pharaohs (1968)
- Up in a Balloon (1970)
- The Mystery of Minoan Civilization (1971)
- Reading the Past: The Story of Deciphering Ancient Languages (1971)
- Lost Civilizations (1974)
