= Boars Hill =

Hamlet in Oxfordshire, England

Coordinates: 51°42′57″N 01°17′31″W

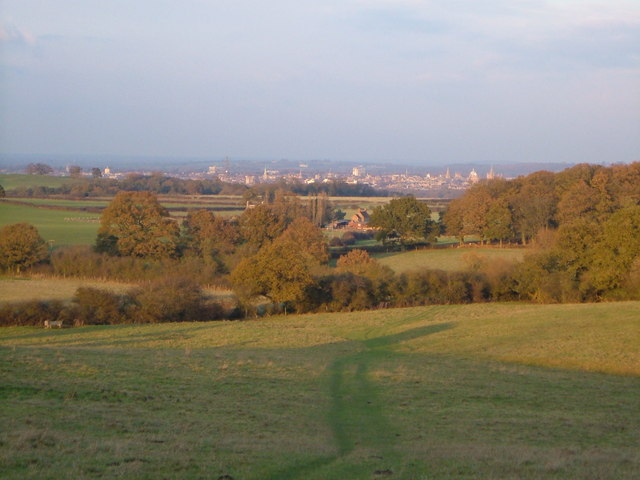
- Old Golf Course at Boars Hill.

- Location within Oxfordshire
- OS grid reference: SP485025
- District: Vale of White Horse
- Shire county: Oxfordshire
- Region: South East
- Country: England
- Sovereign state: United Kingdom
- Post town: Oxford
- Postcode district: OX1
- Dialling code: 01865
- Police: Thames Valley
- Fire: Oxfordshire
- Ambulance: South Central
- UK Parliament: Oxford West and Abingdon

Boars Hill is a hamlet 3 miles (5 km) southwest of Oxford, England, straddling the boundary between the civil parishes of Sunningwell and Wootton. It consists of about 360 dwellings spread over an area of nearly two square miles. Historically, it was part of Berkshire until the 1974 boundary changes transferred it to Oxfordshire.

== History ==
The earliest known record of Boars Hill (or Boreshill) is from the 12th century. The greater part of Boars Hill was historically a manor of the parish of Cumnor until the 19th century when the parish of Wootton was formed. Until the late 19th century the hill was almost bare and had fine views - northwards to the city of Oxford, southwards to the Downs and westwards to the upper Thames valley. At that time many houses were built on Boars Hill, and the new residents planted trees and erected fences and walls; within a few decades they had hidden the celebrated views from all but a few places.

== Churches ==
=== Church of England ===
Boars Hill does not have its own Church of England parish church. As it straddles two parishes the respective parts of Boars Hill are served by St. Peters, Wootton and St. Leonard's, Sunningwell.

=== Roman Catholic ===
St Thomas More Roman Catholic chapel in Boars Hill is part of the Roman Catholic parish of North Hinksey.

== Notable residents ==
=== Poets ===
The first poet to leave a record of a visit to the hill was Arthur Hugh Clough. In his diary for 1841, edited by Anthony Kenny, he describes how a walk across the hill inspired the ninth of his 'Blank misgivings of a creature moving about in worlds not realized'; however, he was concerned over his family's financial straits and his impending final exams, and he found the barrenness of the scene under a grey February sky depressing. When Matthew Arnold came up to Oxford later in 1841, Clough introduced him to Boars Hill, which later provided the inspiration and setting for two of his best-known poems, The Scholar Gipsy (1853) and Thyrsis (1866), the latter written in memory of Clough. The famous phrase in the latter "the dreaming spires" encouraged people to visit the hill and settle there.

Three prominent poets lived on the hill, the first being Margaret Louisa Woods in the 1880s. She was followed by Robert Bridges and John Masefield, successive Poets Laureate. For a couple of years after the First World War, they were joined by three of the war poets: Robert Graves - Masefield's tenant - and Edmund Blunden, both future Oxford Professors of Poetry (as Arnold had been) and (for a few months) Robert Nichols. Bridges' wife Monica Bridges lived there until 1943, when it was hit by a bomb, their daughter, the poet Elizabeth Daryush, continued to live after it was repaired on the hill until her death in 1977. Robert Bridges lived at Chilswell House, which was purchased circa 1963 by the Carmelite order for use as a priory and retreat.

=== Other notable residents ===
The hill was also the home of Gilbert Murray, famous for his verse translations of classical Greek drama, and later the classicist Leighton Durham Reynolds, Emeritus Professor of Classical Languages and Literature, until his death in 1999. Other notable residents were the sculptor Oscar Nemon who fled from Nazi rule in Vienna in 1938, and the archaeologist Sir Arthur Evans who lived on Boars Hill from 1894 until his death in 1941. His house, Youlbury, notable for its Minoan decoration, was bought after his death by his next-door-neighbour Arthur Lehman Goodhart, who later demolished it. Goodhart's son William Goodhart, Baron Goodhart built a modern house on its site, preserving the Victorian gardens. (Those of Margaret Woods, Robert Bridges and Gilbert Murray burnt down.)

Herbert Edward Douglas Blakiston, for many years President of Trinity College, Oxford, and Vice-Chancellor of the University of Oxford, lived in Boar's Hill from his retirement in 1938 until his death in 1942, after he was struck by a car while walking in Boar's Hill. The political scientist and public servant W. G. S. Adams lived there, at a house called Powder Hill, and entertained Horace Plunkett, Sir William Beveridge, Gilbert Murray, John Masefield and Robert Bridges. The husband and wife historians Hugh Trevor Lambrick and Gabrielle Lambrick lived here. The composer Lennox Berkeley was born in Sunningwell Plains, Boar’s Hill, in 1903. The historian Basil Joseph Mathews (1879–1951) lived at Triangle Cottage. Catherine Octavia Stevens, astronomer, built a house and observatory on Boars Hill in 1910 and she lived there until 1956. Frederick Keeble and his wife, the noted actress Lillah McCarthy built a house, Hammels, from old timbers and lived there in the 1920s.

=== The Carritt family ===
During the 1930s, Boars Hill was home to an infamous family of left-wing revolutionaries and intellectuals known as the Carritt family, notable for their deep involvement in anti-fascist activism, activism within the Communist Party of Great Britain, and academic achievements within Oxford University. Famous members of the Carritt family who lived in Boars Hill include:

- Liesel Carritt: A German-Jewish refugee and communist revolutionary who fled Nazi Germany to Oxford with her family. She married into the Carritt family and later fought in the Spanish Civil War.
- Michael Carritt: An Oxford University professor and communist spy who infiltrated the British civil service to pass on intelligence to Indian pro-independence activists.
- Anthony Carritt: An anti-fascist revolutionary and the son of zoologist Arthur Dukinfield Darbishire. He was killed by fascist forces during the Spanish Civil War.
- Edgar Frederick Carritt: English philosopher and Oxford University professor at University College.
- Noel Carritt: Communist, aviation engineer, and anti-fascist revolutionary who fought against fascism during the Spanish Civil War.
- Bill Carritt: British communist activist, politician, humanitarian aid worker, and foreign editor for the Daily Worker.

The Carritt family's home in Boars Hill became famous as a hub for left-wing intellectual debate, attracting a wide number of people including communist trade union leader Abraham Lazarus, multiple labour politicians including Dick Crossman, the novelist Iris Murdoch,^{[1]} and numerous poets including WH Auden^{[2]} and Stephen Spender.^{[3]} The Carritt family were also friends with another family of left-wing activists which lived close to them called the Thompsons, whose famous members included the historian E. P. Thompson and his brother Frank Thompson.^{[1]} The children of both families attended Dragon School together.^{[4]}

== Sites ==
Arthur Evans had Jarn Mound built (by hand), built to create a viewpoint from which to see the famous vistas that had been hidden by development. The surrounding trees have continued to grow taller, and the views are again obscured. Evans left most of his estate to the Boy Scouts and Youlbury Camp is still available for their use. Several sites on Boars Hill, including Jarn Mound, Matthew Arnold Field and land on the north side of the hill with views of the "dreaming spires" of Oxford, are now owned by the Oxford Preservation Trust. From 1933 to 1975 Boars Hill was the home of Ripon Hall. When Ripon Hall moved to Cuddesdon, the site became known as Foxcombe Hall, and was the regional headquarters of the Open University. In 2016 the site was purchased by Peking University. From 1955 to the mid-1970s, Boar's Hill was home to Plater College.

Some digs in 2002 near Lincombe Lane cul-de-sac, 3 metres left and 8 metres forward of the first bend in the road, left of the footpath, uncovered underground walls and a hearth 6 foot deep, which are alleged to be a Roman kiln.

From 1976 to 1996, Warnborough College, occupied the former Plater College facilities, the Bishop's palace of the Diocese of Oxford, and Yatscombe Hall, having moved from Warnborough Road in North Oxford. The college attracted controversy due to allegedly misrepresenting its links to Oxford University and was eventually sued with the site repossessed. Soon after the repossession squatters moved in and the site of the former Bishop's palace and Yatscombe Hall has been subject to numerous planning disputes ever since. Yatscombe Hall was destroyed by fire in December 2003 and all the buildings on the site were demolished and a retirement village was planned. However eventually a development of a four large country homes was built on the site by Millgate Homes.

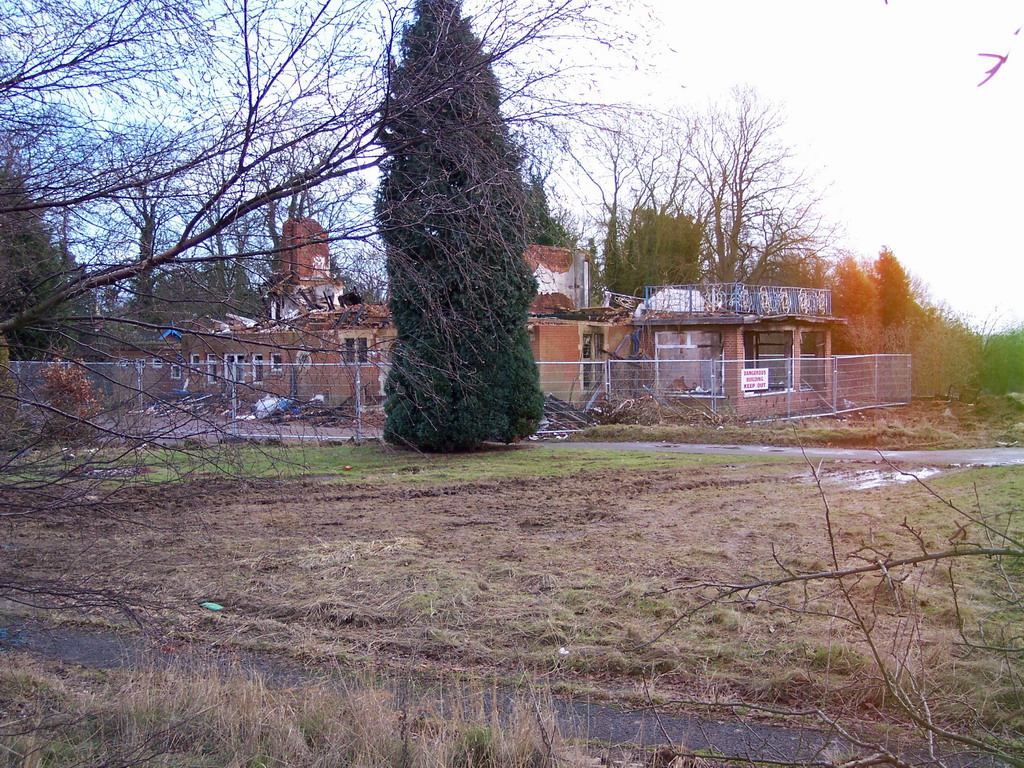
Remains of Yatscombe Hall in January 2004

== Brideshead Revisited ==
Boars Hill is twice mentioned in the 1945 novel Brideshead Revisited by Evelyn Waugh (1903–1966). First, Cousin Jasper advises the young Charles Ryder upon his coming up to Oxford, "Keep clear of Boar's Hill." In contrast, Sebastian Flyte describes a model student at Oxford as one who "smokes a great pipe and plays hockey and goes out to tea on Boar's Hill and to lectures at Keble...".

== See also ==
- Ann Paludan

== Sources ==
- Bright Rix, Mary (1941). Boars Hill, Oxford. Oxford: Hall the Printer.
- Candy, James S (1984). A Tapestry of Life: An Autobiography. Merlin Books. ISBN 0-86303-188-9.
- Clough, Arthur Hugh (1990). Kenny, Anthony (ed.). The Oxford Diaries of Arthur Hugh Clough. Oxford: Clarendon Press. ISBN 0-19-811739-6.
- Evans, Arthur (1933). Jarn Mound. With Its Panorama And Wild Garden Of British Plants. Oxford: Joseph Vincent.
- Hopkins, Claire (2005). Trinity: 450 years of an Oxford college community. Oxford University Press. ISBN 0-19-951896-3.
