= Youlbury Scout Activity Centre =

Scout Camp in the United Kingdom

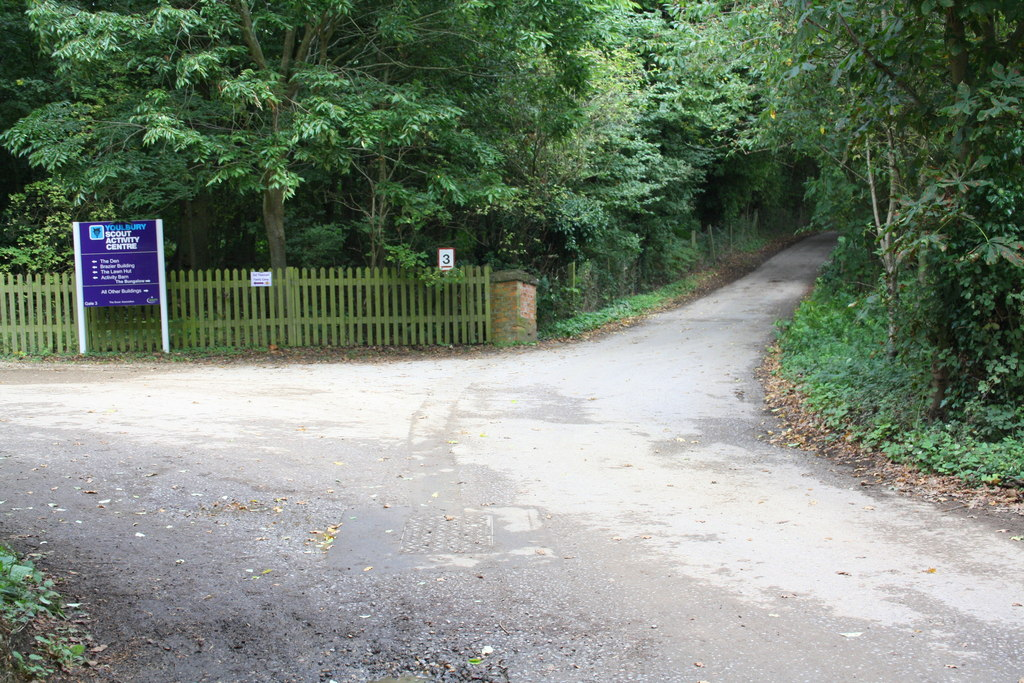
- Location: Boars Hill, Oxford
- Country: United Kingdom
- Coordinates: 51.724627°N 1.300399°W
- Founded: 1913

Youlbury Scout Activity Centre is one of a number of The Scout Association's National Scout Activity Centres in the United Kingdom and is the oldest permanent Scout campsite in the world (while Brownsea Island was the site of the first campsite, it was a private island for many years after).

The Centre, which is based near Oxford, is open to Scouts from around the world, and offers many activities as well as camping and accommodation in huts.

== History ==
The site was first used as a meeting place and camping field in 1913 when the site owner, Sir Arthur Evans, had a cabin built for a local Scout patrol. This building was demolished in the 1980s, but many other of the original buildings still stand.

Since then, the site has been developed and expanded to accommodate large gatherings of Scouts, offering activities such as swimming, archery, shooting, climbing, and more.

=== Milestones ===
Milestones

- 1913 - the log cabin for the Scouts is built
- 1919 - Gilwell Park, a centre for Scoutmaster training is founded
- 1925 - Baden-Powell approaches the landowner to use Youlbury as another training centre
- 1939 - Gilwell Park is commandeered by the Army, and the Scout Movement move their headquarters to Youlbury
- 1941 - Sir Arthur Evans dies, leaving instructions that site be sold to the Scout Movement for a "reasonable price"
- 1946 - Headquarters returns to Gilwell Park
- 2013 - Youlbury celebrates its centenary as a scout camp site

== Location ==
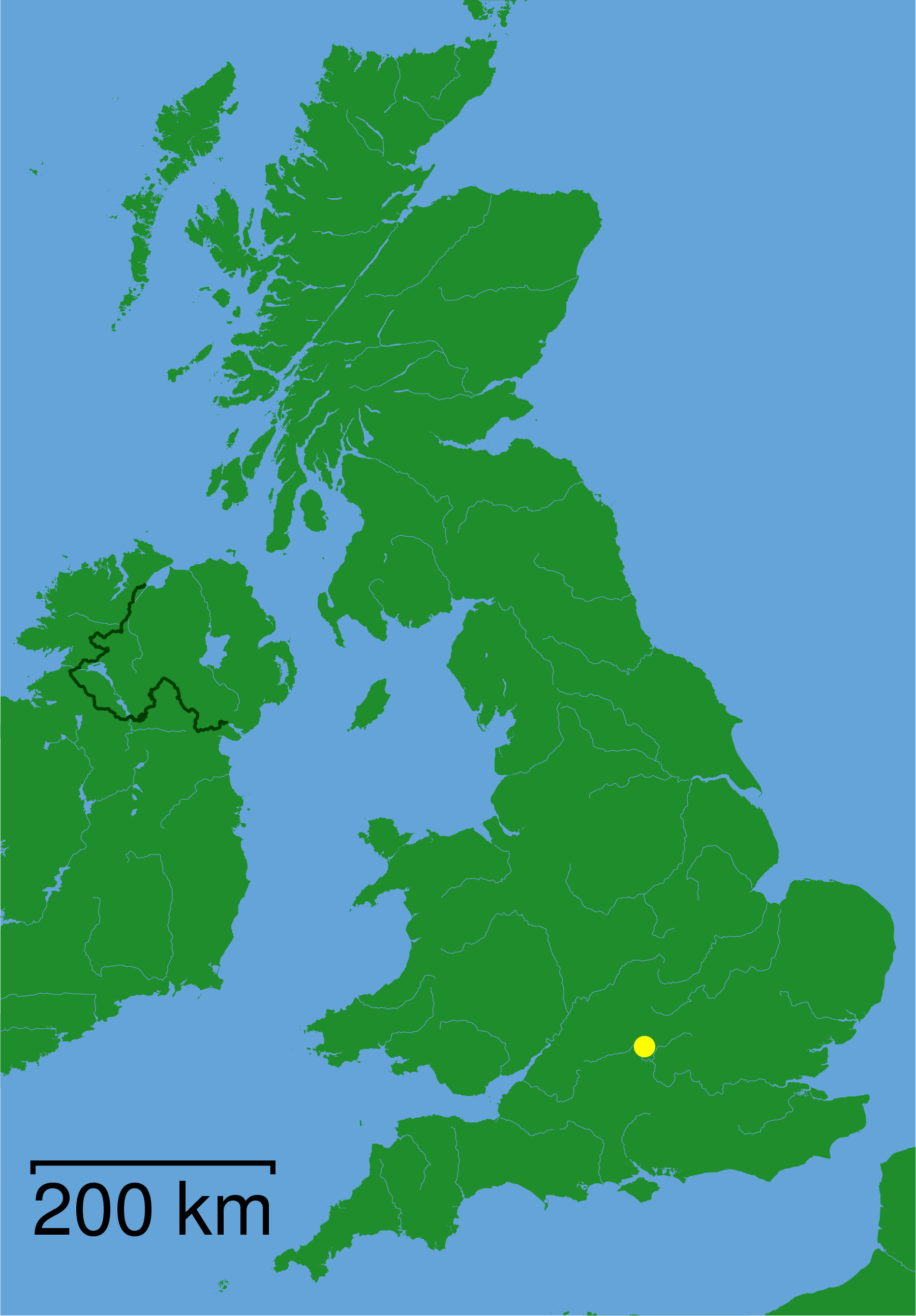
Map of UK showing location of Oxford

Youlbury is situated in a wooded area just north of Boars Hill, about 5 miles west of Oxford.

== Facilities ==
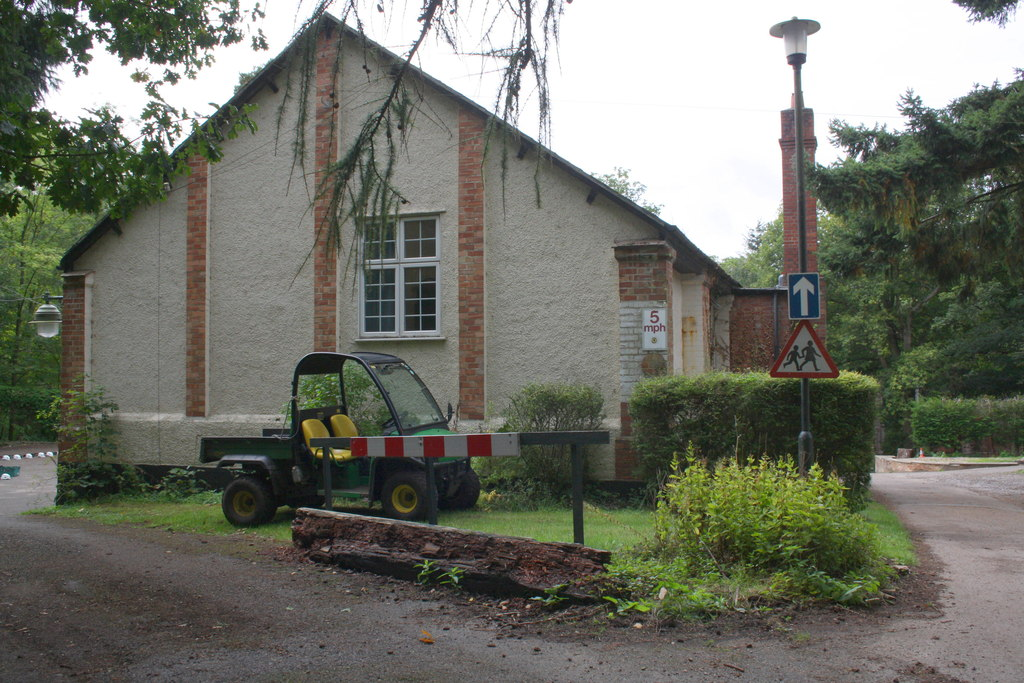
Building at the centre, near to the North of site.

=== Campsites ===
Youlbury has a large number of fields and sites spread around the woodland.

Each camping area has designated fire circles, and have shared toilet and washing facilities.

=== Indoor accommodation ===
There are a number of buildings with varying facilities available on the site. This provides for the younger sections who require alternative indoor accommodation when camping, and also for training purposes.

- The Small Clearing Tented Village - Small Lawn Tented Village is a tented village with cooking facilities
- The Forth Clearing Tented Village - Forth Clearing Tented Village is an outdoor lodging with cooking facilities
- The Lawn Hut - was originally a Croquet pavilion and was the building which the Scouts had asked to be allowed to use before having the log cabin built. It has a kitchen and main hall, but no beds
- Camp Headquarters Building - Staff accommodation. No access to members of the public
- The Gulf Building - Removed in 2019
- The Brazier Building - Planned for demolition in 2025
- The Training Centre - This is now the kitchen for the Catering Barn
- The Activity Barn - Now the Catering Barn is a place to feed campers should they wish.
- Bear's Den - Replaced the old den and museum in 2013. Sleeps fifty in ensuite rooms
- The Centenary Lodge - a building that sleeps 36, large kitchen, main room, boot room with wash/dry facilities, en suites on every room, and a large decking area to the rear.

== Activities ==
The site offers a number of activities on or near site, all properly supervised:

- Climbing and Abseiling
- Go-Karts
- Air Rifle Shooting (Indoor Range)
- Assault Course
- Archery
- Pioneering
- Orienteering
- Aerial Trek
- 3G Swing
- Jacobs Ladder
- Crate Stacking

Sailing is also available nearby, and there is the CuriOXity Science Centre in Oxford, and a rural farm museum nearby.

== Staff ==
The site is overseen by a Centre Manager, who manages a small permanent staff who maintain the site and supervise the various activities.

Over the summer months, as the site is much busier, volunteers are recruited from nearby Scout and Guide Groups and from international members of Scouting or Guiding.

== See also ==
- Baden-Powell House - hostel and conference centre for Scouting
- Brownsea Island Scout camp - the birthplace of World Scouting
- Downe Scout Activity Centre
- Ferny Crofts Scout Activity Centre
- Gilwell Park - the current home of UK Scouting
