= John Lowe (Dean of Christ Church) =

The Very Reverend John Lowe
- Dean of Christ Church

Personal details
- Born: 1899 Calgary, Alberta, Canada
- Died: 1960 (aged 60–61)
- Denomination: Anglican

John Lowe (1899–1960) was Dean of Christ Church, Oxford, England (1939–59) and Vice-Chancellor of the University of Oxford (1948–51).

== Life ==
Born in Calgary, Alberta, Canada, he studied at Trinity College, Toronto and went on to the University of Oxford as a Rhodes scholar (1922). He returned to Trinity College, where he taught for twelve years, serving as Dean of Divinity (1933–39), before taking up his post at Christ Church, Oxford.

== Selected works ==
- The Lord's prayer (Oxford: Clarendon Press, 1962)
- Saint Peter (Oxford: Clarendon Press, 1956)
- The interpretation of the Lord's prayer (Evanston: Seabury-Western Theological Seminary, 1955)
- Diocese of Oxford: The cathedral handbook (Oxford: n.p., 1955)

Academic offices
Preceded by Alwyn Williams	Dean of Christ Church, Oxford; 1939–1959	Succeeded by Cuthbert Aikman Simpson
Preceded by William Teulon Swan Stallybrass	Vice-Chancellor of the University of Oxford; 1948–1951	Succeeded by Maurice Bowra
