= Alic Halford Smith =

British philosopher and Vice-Chancellor of Oxford University

Alic Halford Smith (1883–1958) was a British philosopher and Vice-Chancellor of Oxford University.

Alic Smith was educated at Dulwich College in south London and New College, Oxford. He began his career at the Scottish Office (1906–19). Subsequently, he was a Fellow at New College, where he was tutor in philosophy (1919–44), and then Warden (head) of the College (1944–58). Smith was Vice-Chancellor of the University of Oxford from 1954 to 1957. He was also a Fellow of Winchester College and Honorary Fellow of King's College, Cambridge.

Smith was awarded the Freedom of the City of Oxford on 10 February 1955.

Academic offices
Preceded by H. A. L. Fisher	Warden of New College, Oxford; 1944–1958	Succeeded by Sir William Hayter
Preceded by Maurice Bowra	Vice-Chancellor of Oxford University; 1954–1957	Succeeded by John Cecil Masterman
