= Reinhold Pauli =

German historian (1823–1882)

Reinhold Pauli (25 May 1823 in Berlin – 3 June 1882 in Bremen) was a German historian of England.

== Life ==
He studied at the universities of Bonn and Berlin, where he received his PhD in 1846. In 1847 he moved to England, where he served as private secretary to Baron von Bunsen, the Prussian ambassador in London. In 1852–55 he studied history in Edinburgh, Oxford, Cambridge and London. In 1855 he returned to Germany, and successively became a professor of history at the universities of Rostock, Tübingen, Marburg and Göttingen. In 1866 he left the University of Tübingen because of his political views.

He wrote The Life of King Alfred (1852), History of England from the Accession of Henry II to the Death of Henry VII, Pictures of Old England (1861) and Simon de Montfort (1876).

== Influence ==
John Robert Seeley dedicated his biography of Heinrich Friedrich Karl vom und zum Stein to Pauli, stating that "Germany may boast of having put the history of every great European state as much within the reach of her public as her own history. Your countrymen can study the affairs of foreign countries not merely in translations, or hasty magazine-articles, but in elaborate works, written in their own language, with full responsibility and independence of judgment, written also by those who understand clearly the wants the public which they write. Among this group of writers you are best known in England, and I shall make my object in writing this best understood by announcing in this dedication that I belong to your school"
