= The Harrovian =

Harrow School student newspaper

The Harrovian is a weekly newspaper published by Harrow School during term time "as an organ of record, and a forum for comment, debate and expression of individual opinion within the school". All articles are published anonymously, except for letters which are signed. The Harrovian is printed on cream paper and is usually 8 A4 sides long (including photos).

Articles are written on any topic. There are comment articles on current affairs, reports on school trips, society meetings, and concerts amongst other things as well as the results of school matches. The only regular column is 'Here and There' which reports on achievements of Old Harrovians, staff weddings/babies, and other notable events. However, other columns come and go. For example, the scientific column 'The Strutt' (after John William Strutt 3rd Baron Rayleigh OH), satire columns such as the current 'Spyglass' column, recipe columns ('Two Fat Ladies') and university advice.

The Harrovian has been published under various guises and titles since 1828. Previous titles include The Tyro, Harrow Notes, or The Record. Almost all have survived in bound versions, though the earliest are simple Latin or Greek translations. At times through its history there have also been supplements, notably the War Supplements informing of the situation of Old Harrovians.

Other periodicals published by Harrow School are Goulash (a satire magazine), The Harrow Record (a twice-yearly roundup), Harrow Notes (an illustrated magazine) 10 Miles to London (creative writing by boys at the School). However, the current creative writing weekly, which is published in collaboration with other schools in the Harrow Family is called the Harrow Family Creative Writing Anthology.

Former Editors of The Harrovian include writer and historian Simon Sebag-Montefiore, Richard Curtis, Alexander Newman, Dylan Winward and journalist and biographer Jasper Rees.
