= Charles Henry Sampson =

British mathematician

Charles Henry Sampson (1859-1936) was Principal of Brasenose College, Oxford, from 1920 until his death.

Sampson was born in Bristol and educated at Bristol Grammar School and Balliol College, Oxford. A mathematician, he became a Fellow of Brasenose in 1882; a Tutor in 1884; and a Senior Tutor in 1894.

His son Ronald died in the Great War. Sampson himself died on 5 November 1936.

== Notes ==
Academic offices
Preceded by Charles Buller Heberden	Principals of Brasenose College, Oxford; 1920–1936	Succeeded by William Stallybrass
