= William Stallybrass =

Vice-Chancellor of the University of Oxford (1883–1948)

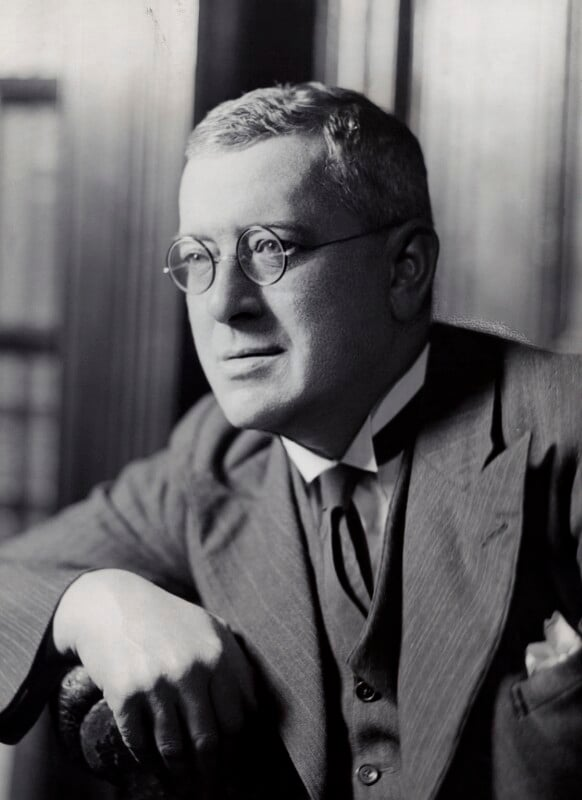
Stallybrass in 1936

William Teulon Swan Stallybrass (formerly William Teulon Swan Sonnenschein; 22 November 1883 – 28 October 1948) was a barrister, Principal of Brasenose College, Oxford, from 1936, and Vice-Chancellor of the University of Oxford from October 1947 until his death.

He was the son of the publisher William Swan Sonnenschein and the nephew of the classical scholar Edward Adolf Sonnenschein, and was colloquially known at Oxford as "Sonners" for his former surname; in 1917, together with his father, he took the surname of his great-grandfather, the Reverend Edward Stallybrass.

As an undergraduate at Brasenose, he played cricket; he served as treasurer of the Oxford University Cricket Club from 1914 to 1946. He was a barrister when he was asked in 1912 to return to his college as a fellow, where he specialised in criminal law and became Principal of the college in 1936. He was elected Vice-Chancellor of the university in October 1947.

He died a year later in a railway accident when he stepped out of a moving train near Iver station in Buckinghamshire, the first death of an Oxford vice-chancellor while in office. He was almost blind at the time.

== Books ==
- The Pocket Emerson, edited by W. T. S. Sonnenschein (1909)
- A Society of States; or, sovereignty, independence, and equality in a League of Nations (1918)
- The Buccaneers of America, translation of 1684–5 (with facsimiles of the original engravings), revised and edited by W. Stallybrass, et al. (1923)
- The Law of Torts, 8th edition (1934)

Academic offices
| Preceded by Charles Henry Sampson | Principal of Brasenose College, Oxford; 1936–1948 | Succeeded by Hugh Last |
| Preceded by Sir Richard Winn Livingstone | Vice-Chancellor of Oxford University; 1947–1948 | Succeeded by The Very Reverend John Lowe |
