= Kula Shaker discography =

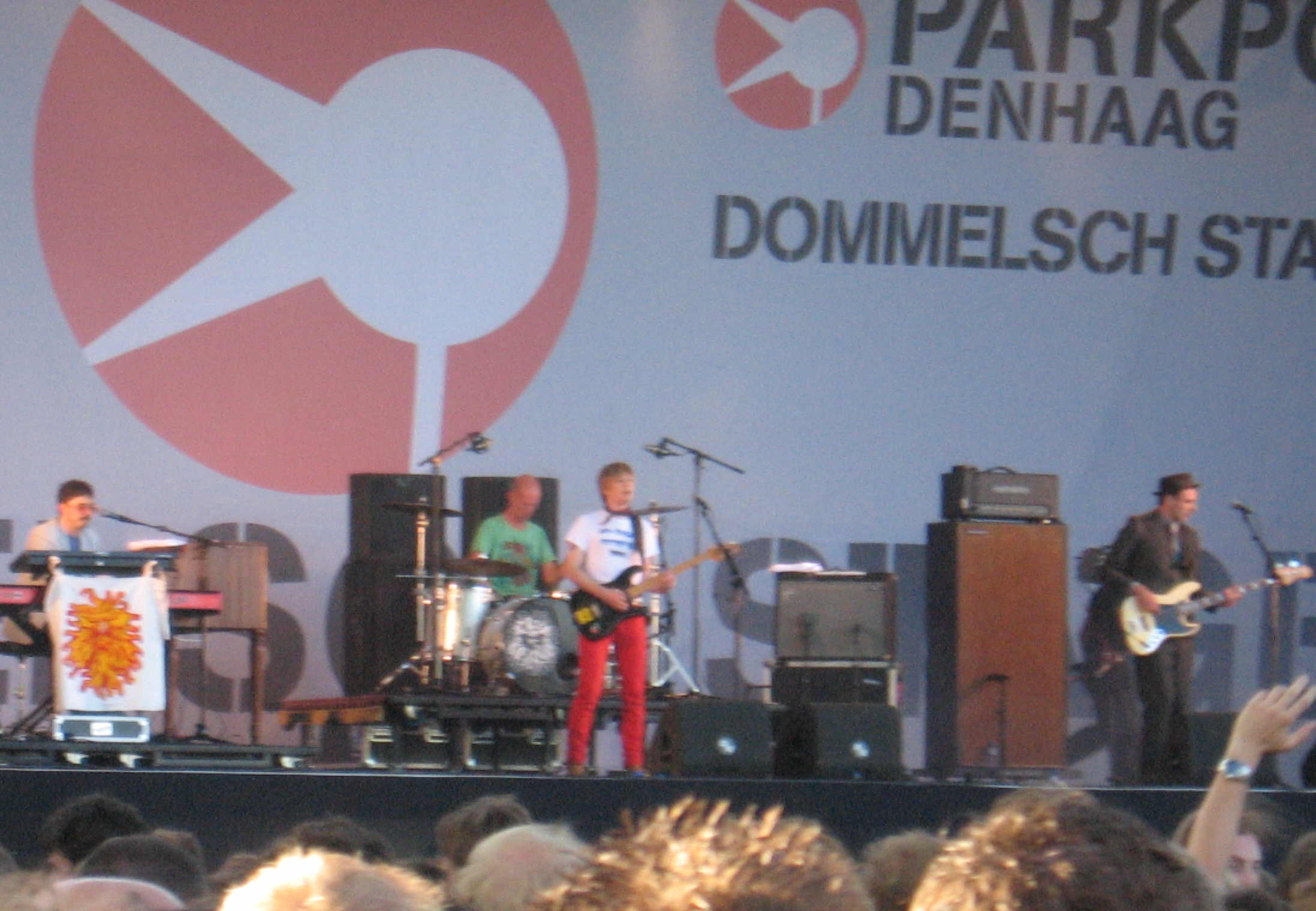
- Kula Shaker performing live at Parkpop in 2008
- Studio albums: 8
- Extended plays: 4
- Compilation albums: 3
- Singles: 19
- Music videos: 14

The English psychedelic rock band Kula Shaker, originally formed in 1993 as The Kays, has released eight major studio albums, as well as numerous singles with extensive B-sides, music videos, and EPs. The band has also contributed to film soundtracks and TV advertisements.

== Albums ==
=== Studio albums ===
List of studio albums, with selected chart positions and certifications
Title	Release date	Peak chart positions										Certifications
Title	Release date	UK	AUS	AUT	BEL	FIN	JPN	NLD	NOR	NZ	SWE	Certifications
K	16 September 1996	1	35	—	47	22	13	22	19	23	20	BPI: 3× Platinum
Peasants, Pigs & Astronauts	8 March 1999	9	36	31	38	17	21	63	6	—	26	BPI: Gold
Strangefolk	20 August 2007	69	—	—	85	—	32	57	—	—	—	
Pilgrims Progress	28 June 2010	117	—	—	—	—	37	100	—	—	—	
K 2.0	12 February 2016	32	—	—	111	—	—	66	—	—	—	
1st Congregational Church of Eternal Love (and Free Hugs)	10 June 2022	169	—	—	—	—	50	—	—	—	—	
Natural Magick	2 February 2024	22	—	—	—	—	44	—	—	—	—	
Wormslayer	30 January 2026	13	—	—	175	—	—	—	—	—	—	
K-Reinkarnate	5 February 2027	—	—	—	—	—	—	—	—	—	—	
"—" denotes releases that did not chart.

=== Compilation albums ===
List of compilation albums
Title	Year
Kollected – The Best Of	2002
Tattva: The Very Best of Kula Shaker	2007
Govinda – The Very Best Of Kula Shaker	2016

== Extended plays ==
List of extended plays, with selected chart positions
Title	Details	Peak chart positions
Title	Details	JPN
Summer Sun EP	Released: 29 July 1997	—
Revenge of the King	Released: 26 July 2006	87
Freedom Lovin' People	Released: 4 June 2007	73
Kula Christmas Wrap Up	Released: 21 December 2021	—
"—" denotes releases that did not chart.

== Singles ==
List of singles, with selected chart positions and certifications
Title	Year	Chart positions					Certifications	Album
Title	Year	UK	AUS	NLD	US Alt.	US Main.	Certifications	Album
"Tattva (Lucky 13 Mix)"	1995	96	—	—	—	—		K
"Grateful When You're Dead"	1996	35	—	—	—	—		K
"Tattva"	1996	4	—	—	10	—		K
"Hey Dude"	1996	2	58	—	25	—	BPI: Silver	K
"Govinda"	1996	7	—	—	—	—		K
"Hush"	1997	2	67	34	—	19	BPI: Silver	Non-album single
"Sound of Drums"	1998	3	—	—	—	—		Peasants, Pigs & Astronauts
"Mystical Machine Gun"	1999	14	—	96	—	—		Peasants, Pigs & Astronauts
"Shower Your Love"	1999	14	—	—	—	—		Peasants, Pigs & Astronauts
"Second Sight"	2007	101	—	—	—	—		Strangefolk
"Out on the Highway"	2007	—	—	—	—	—		Strangefolk
"Drink Tea (For the Love of God)"	2007	—	—	—	—	—		Non-album single
"Peter Pan R.I.P"	2010	—	—	—	—	—		Pilgrims Progress
"Christmas Time (Is Here Again)" / "Snowflake"	2010	—	—	—	—	—		Non-album single
"Infinite Sun"	2015	—	—	—	—	—		K 2.0
"Let Love Be (With U)"	2016	—	—	—	—	—		K 2.0
"2 Styx"	2016	—	—	—	—	—		K 2.0
"Holy Flame"	2016	—	—	—	—	—		K 2.0
"The Once and Future King"	2022	—	—	—	—	—		1st Congregational Church of Eternal Love and Free Hugs
"Cherry Plum Tree (Farewell Beautiful Dreamer)"	2022	—	—	—	—	—		1st Congregational Church of Eternal Love and Free Hugs
"Gimme Some Truth"	2022	—	—	—	—	—		Non-album single
"Waves"	2023	—	—	—	—	—		Natural Magick
"Indian Record Player"	2023	—	—	—	—	—		Natural Magick
"Natural Magick"	2024	—	—	—	—	—		Natural Magick
"Rational Man" / "Bringing it Back Home"	2024	—	—	—	—	—		Non-album single
"Charge of the Light Brigade"	2025	—	—	—	—	—		Wormslayer
"—" denotes releases that did not chart.

== Music videos ==
List of music videos
Title	Director(s)	Release date	Notes
"Grateful When You're Dead"	Gavin Evans	February 1996	The band's first music video.
"Tattva"	Nigel Dick	March 1996	
"Tattva" (US version)			
"Hey Dude"	Tim Maurice Jones	August 1996	The video was shot on an open top bus driving through central London.
"Govinda"	Michael Geoghegan	November 1996	
"Hush"		January 1997	Live and backstage footage
"Hush" (US version)		1997	studio video
"Sound of Drums"		April 1998	Video developed by Stylorouge using live footage from a gig at Leeds Town and Country Club.
"Mystical Machine Gun"	Doug Nichol	January 1999	
"Shower Your Love"	John McFarlane	May 1999	
"Great Dictator (Of the Free World)"	Lucy Bailey	2007	
"Second Sight"	Lucy Bailey	August 2007	
"Drink Tea (for the Love of God!)"	Model Robot	December 2007	
"Peter Pan R.I.P"	Crispian Mills	2010	
"Infinite Sun"		December 2015	
"Let Love Be (With U)"		May 2016	
"2 Styx"		August 2016	
"I'm Against It"		December 2020	
"The Once and Future King"		May 2022	
