= Shower Your Love =

1999 single by Kula Shaker

Single by Kula Shaker

from the album Peasants, Pigs & Astronauts
- Released: 3 May 1999
- Length: 3:38
- Label: Columbia
- Songwriter: Crispian Mills
- Producers: Bob Ezrin, Crispian Mills

Kula Shaker singles chronology
"Mystical Machine Gun" (1999)	"Shower Your Love" (1999)	"Second Sight" (2007)

"Shower Your Love" is a song by English psychedelic rock band Kula Shaker. It first appeared on their second album, Peasants, Pigs & Astronauts, in March 1999 and was released as a single two months later. It reached number 14 on the UK Singles Chart.

== Releases ==
Issued on two CDs and a cassette, "Shower Your Love" is augmented by three B-sides and a radio session recording of 1998 single "Sound of Drums". The first CD came in a standard slimline jewel case and the second in a Digipak with four photographic cards. These were taken at the 100 Club in London in March 1999 by Jill Furmanovsky. The artwork is slightly different for each release; the second CD is shown to the right.

The initial UK release had an error with the track listing, which meant that the tracks from CD2 were pressed on the discs for both CD1 and CD2. This meant that CD1 played the incorrect songs for tracks two and three. This was quickly fixed and purchasers of the initial pressing of CD1 could return it to the retailer and receive a replacement disc. Both "Shower Your Love" and "Light of the Day" were included on the retrospective compilation Kollected in 2002.

== Track listings ==
UK CD1

1. "Shower Your Love" – 3:38
2. "Goodbye Tin Terriers" – 4:22
3. "Sound of Drums" (Live Radio 1 Session) – 4:23

UK CD2

1. "Shower Your Love" – 3:38
2. "The Dancing Flea" (from Jay Darlington Plays, 'The Dancing Flea') – 1:47
3. "Light of the Day" – 2:37

UK cassette single and European CD single

1. "Shower Your Love" – 3:38
2. "Goodbye Tin Terriers" – 4:22

Australian CD single

1. "Shower Your Love" – 3:40
2. "Sound of Drums" (Live Radio 1 Session) – 4:23
3. "The Dancing Flea" (from Jay Darlington Plays, 'The Dancing Flea') – 1:47
4. "Light of the Day" – 2:37

Japanese CD single

1. "Shower Your Love"
2. "Goodbye Tin Terriers"
3. "Sound of Drums" (Live Radio 1 Session)
4. "The Dancing Flea" (from Jay Darlington Plays, 'The Dancing Flea')
5. "Light of the Day"

== Personnel ==
Personnel are taken from the UK CD1 liner notes and the Peasants, Pigs & Astronauts album booklet.

- Crispian Mills – lyrics, music, vocals, acoustic guitars, electric guitars, harmonica, production
- Alonza Bevan – backing vocals, acoustic guitar loops, bass
- Jay Darlington – Wurlitzer piano, organs, keyboards
- Paul Winterhart – drums
- A.K. Durvesh – shehnai
- Graham Pattison – loops and soundscapes
- Ed Shearmur – string arrangement
- Bob Ezrin – production
- Fulton Dingley – engineering
- Stylorouge – design and art direction
- Jeff Cottenden – photography

== Charts ==
Chart (1999)	Peak position
Europe (Eurochart Hot 100)	57
Scotland Singles (OCC)	10
UK Singles (OCC)	14

== Release history ==
Region	Date	Format(s)	Label(s)	Ref.
United Kingdom	3 May 1999	CD; cassette	Columbia	
Japan	19 May 1999	CD	Epic; Flying	
United States	29 June 1999	Mainstream rock; active rock radio	Columbia	
