= Tattva: The Very Best of Kula Shaker =

Greatest hits album by Kula Shaker
- Released: 16 July 2007
- Recorded: 1996–1999
- Genre: Rock
- Length: 140:14
- Label: Music Club Deluxe
- Producer: Pat Gilbert

Kula Shaker chronology
Revenge of the King (2006)	Tattva: The Very Best of Kula Shaker (2007)	Strangefolk (2007)

Tattva: The Very Best of Kula Shaker 2007 is a best-of double album released in 2007 by the record label Music Club. It includes all the tracks from Kula Shaker's first two albums and a handful of previously released non-album tracks. It is not an official 'best of' and the band have asked fans not to buy it.

== Track listing ==
Disc 1

1. "Hey Dude" – 4:11
2. "Knight on the Town" – 3:25
3. "Temple of Everlasting Light" – 2:33
4. "Govinda" – 4:57
5. "Smart Dogs" – 3:17
6. "Magic Theatre" – 2:39
7. "Into the Deep" – 3:50
8. "Sleeping Jiva" – 2:02
9. "Tattva" – 3:47
10. "Grateful When You're Dead/Jerry Was There" – 5:42
11. "303" – 3:09
12. "Start All Over" – 2:36
13. "Hollow Man (Parts 1&2)" – 6:15
14. "Another Life" – 4:19
15. "Troubled Mind" – 3:14
16. "Smart Dogs (live)" – 3:47
17. "Govinda (live)" – 8:11
18. "Hey Dude (live)" – 5:29

Disc 2

1. "Hush" – 2:59
2. "Great Hosannah" – 6:07
3. "Mystical Machine Gun" – 5:42
4. "SOS" – 2:55
5. "Radhe Radhe" – 2:49
6. "I'm Still Here" – 1:31
7. "Shower Your Love" – 3:40
8. "108 Battles (of the Mind)" – 3:16
9. "Sound of Drums" – 4:28
10. "Timeworm" – 4:02
11. "Last Farewell" – 2:47
12. "Golden Avatar" – 4:30
13. "Namami Nanda-Nandana" – 5:10
14. "Stotra" – 2:25
15. "Hurry on Sundown (Hari Om Sundown)" – 4:42
16. "Guitar Man" – 3:05
17. "Avalonia" – 2:18
18. "Sound of Drums (live)" – 4:25
