= Gouri Choudhury =

British singer and Bengali music teacher

Gouri Choudhury গৌরী চৌধুরী
- Born: May 1964 (age 61); Sylhet District, East Pakistan (now Bangladesh)
- Origin: London, England
- Genres: Bhajan; adhunik; Hindi; Bengali; World music
- Occupations: Singer; music teacher
- Instrument: Vocals

Gouri Choudhury (Bengali: গৌরী চৌধুরী; born May 1964) is a Bangladeshi-born British singer and music teacher.

== Early life ==
Choudhury was born into a musical family in Sylhet District, East Pakistan (now Bangladesh). She started singing from the age of six.

In 1984, Choudhury completed her Secondary School Certificate. In 1985, she attended Sylhet Academy of Fine Arts and gained a diploma in Folk Songs. She then studied at Sylhet Shilpakala Academy, where received a diploma in Music and her Higher School Certificate. She continued her education and went to Chittagong University in 1988, where she studied Bachelor of Arts.

== Career ==
After finishing her education, Choudhury came to the United Kingdom and started to work from 1989. She has worked as a Bengali music teacher in various London schools. She has in the past also volunteered as a Women's Development Officer for Bangladesh Welfare Association where she helped develop Asian women's skills and talents. She has recorded four cassettes and two CDs, one of Hindi music and one of Bengali music. In September 2011, she appeared on Sa Re Ga Ma Pa, a music show broadcast on Zee TV.

Choudhury featured in the music video for Kula Shaker's 1996 song "Tattva", which reached number four in the UK charts. She is seen sitting playing the sitar. She also appears on different tracks and albums of this band. For example, in 1996 as 'Gauri' on the track "Govinda" with Himangshu Goswami on K and in 1999 as 'Gouri Choudhury' on the track "Radhe Radhe" with Crispian Mills on Peasants, Pigs & Astronauts.

In May 2011, Choudhury performed at the Boishakhi Mela. In the same month, she was interviewed by Anwarul Hoque on BBC Asian Network.

Choudhury has over 20 years of experience singing a range of songs, including folk, Tagore and modern songs in multiple languages such as Bengali, Hindi and Urdu. She has toured Europe, the US and Canada.

She now lives in London, United Kingdom and teaches Hindi and Bengali music to younger children through our music company Gouri Choudhury Suraloy.

== Awards and recognition ==
Choudhury has won many "Best Singer" awards, from Bangla TV in 2004, BIMA in 2004, ATN Bangla in 2005 and the community award for "Best Singer" from Channel S in 2006.

In 2002, she won the "Best Performance Award" after being asked by Zee TV to perform on their show Antaksari.

== See also ==
- British Bangladeshi
- List of British Bangladeshis
- Music of Bengal
