= Kollected – The Best Of =

Compilation album by Kula Shaker
- Released: 16 December 2002
- Recorded: 1996–1999
- Genre: Rock
- Length: 72:53
- Label: Sony Music Distribution

Kula Shaker chronology
Peasants, Pigs & Astronauts (1999)	Kollected – The Best Of (2002)	Revenge of the King (2006)

Professional ratings
Review scores
Source	Rating
AllMusic	4/5 stars
NME	0.5/5 stars

Kollected – The Best Of is a 2002 compilation album by Kula Shaker. There are sixteen songs on the album: seven from their debut album K, four from Peasants, Pigs & Astronauts and five non-album tracks.

== Track listing ==
1. "Sound of Drums"
2. "Into the Deep"
3. "Grateful When You're Dead/Jerry Was There"
4. "108 Battles (of the Mind)"
5. "Start All Over"
6. "Hey Dude"
7. "Drop in the Sea"
8. "Shower Your Love"
9. "Hush" (Joe South)
10. "Tattva"
11. "303"
12. "Light of the Day"
13. "Mystical Machine Gun"
14. "Ballad of a Thin Man" (Bob Dylan)
15. "Dance in Your Shadow"
16. "Govinda" (includes an excerpt of "Strangefolk") ^{Confirmation needed}
- There is a 1 minute and 50 seconds hidden/ghost song at the end of "Govinda", about 13 minutes after it has finished. This is actually mentioned in the booklet that comes with the CD, the chorus is mentioned: "It seems there was no more room left on the album for ten-minute long tracks with choruses like: 'In the beginning was the word, and the word was ... "Aum Keshavaya namah aum" …'" (Possibly misprinted, "om keshavaya namah" means "O my Lord Keshava, I offer my respectful obeisances unto You.") The iTunes Music Store states that this clip is named "Strangefolk", which was the original title of their second album before Kula Shaker changed it to Peasants, Pigs and Astronauts.

The clip from Kollected is part of the original 'Strangefolk' track, which was left off "Peasants, Pigs & Astronauts", and was only made available on the 10th anniversary limited edition.

Five years after the release of Kollected, Kula Shaker would go on to name their third album Strangefolk. Included on this album is a totally different track also titled "Strangefolk".

- Cover of the Joe South classic "Hush" was previously only available on the soundtrack to the film I Know What You Did Last Summer and on the single released in 1996.
- The tracks "Drop in the Sea", "Light of the Day" and "Dance in Your Shadow" were previously released as B-sides.
- "Ballad of a Thin Man" was a track intended for a Bob Dylan tribute album which was never released. The song was finally released on the soundtrack to the film Stoned.
