= Natural Magick =

2024 studio album by Kula Shaker

Studio album by Kula Shaker
- Released: 2 February 2024
- Recorded: 2023
- Studio: Metway Studio (Brighton, England)
- Genre: Rock
- Length: 46:33
- Label: Strange F.O.L.K.
- Producer: Kev Nixon, Crispian Mills, Alonza Bevan

Kula Shaker chronology
1st Congregational Church of Eternal Love and Free Hugs (2022)	Natural Magick (2024)	Wormslayer (2026)

Singles from Natural Magick
- 1. "Waves" Released: 28 July 2023; 2. "Indian Record Player" Released: 13 October 2023; 3. "Natural Magick" Released: 5 January 2024

Natural Magick is the seventh studio album by the English rock band Kula Shaker, released on 2 February 2024. Co-produced by Kev Nixon along with band members Crispian Mills and Alonza Bevan, it is the first album to feature all four of the group's founding members since 1999's Peasants, Pigs & Astronauts, as organist Jay Darlington had rejoined in late 2022. The album reached No. 22 on the UK Albums Chart.

== Background ==
When Kula Shaker officially reformed in 2006 (after disbanding in 1999), Jay Darlington was the sole founding member not to return, as at that time he was the touring keyboardist for Oasis. The band instead brought in keyboardist Harry Broadbent from 2006 to 2022, releasing four studio albums with him until Darlington’s return in late 2022. Darlington's first show back with Kula Shaker was at Shepherd's Bush Empire on 8 December 2022.

== Content ==
"It's that spirit of, you know, like the MC5...and that good spirit of the 1960s. It was revolution but it was also fun. It wasn't a serious sort of Troskyite committee meeting. It was a party and also we wanted change as well".

— Alonza Bevan on how Natural Magick reflects the political climate of the '60s.

Numerous songs on the album reference anti-establishment views, critique modernity, and address political polarisation within society. The opening track, "Gaslighting", includes the line "The revolution will not be live-streamed across all social-media platforms" in reference to Gil Scott-Heron's poem. When asked to elaborate on the track's meaning in a 2025 interview with LouderSound, Mills stated that "It's about being disempowered by the ferocious psychosis that's going on. People are not being encouraged to believe in themselves. We are on the side of people, of humanity, we're not really involved in politics". This idea of disillusionment and confusion in the modern world is expanded upon in the "Simon & Garfunkel-esque" song "Something Dangerous". As Mills explains the track "Idon'twannapaymytaxes": "[I]n Britain... we were brought up on the idea that if we paid our taxes, we were somehow helping each other. And it turns out that all we're doing, really, is paying for bombs". "F-Bombs" contains a profanity-laced chorus protesting war and political manipulation.

"Waves", with its "swirling Hammond organ and a big singalong chorus", embraces imagery of "an international rock party". "Indian Record Player" and "Chura Liya (You Stole My Heart)" pay homage to the band's Bollywood influences, such as R. D. Burman, Asha Parekh, and the soundtrack to the 1960 film Mughal-e-Azam. "Happy Birthday" features the Hare Krishna mantra.

Other songs explore genres beyond Kula Shaker's traditional raga rock and Britpop sound. The minor-key title track, "Natural Magick", incorporates funk grooves and includes chants of "M-A-G-I-C-K" in its chorus. "Whistle and I Will Come" is reminiscent of a western film score, in tribute to Crispian Mills' actress mother Hayley, who starred in the 1961 film Whistle Down the Wind. "Stay With Me Tonight" is a country ballad where Mills duets with female vocalist Alanoud Gigante. The optimistic closer "Give Me Tomorrow" is an "ever-growing 50's torch song" that incorporates country and soul elements.

== Recording ==
The album was recorded at Metway Studio in Brighton, England. In an October 2023 interview, Mills commented that: "We recorded between breaks during gigging as it's the surest way to capture that live energy [and] much of the recording went smoothly and quickly. The longest part of the process usually involved finding the right tempo. [...] The songwriting process was fairly quick but intensive, with lots of acoustic demos. The return of Jay [Darlington] created a good wave of energy, and we road-tested a lot of these songs before we recorded them".

== Release ==
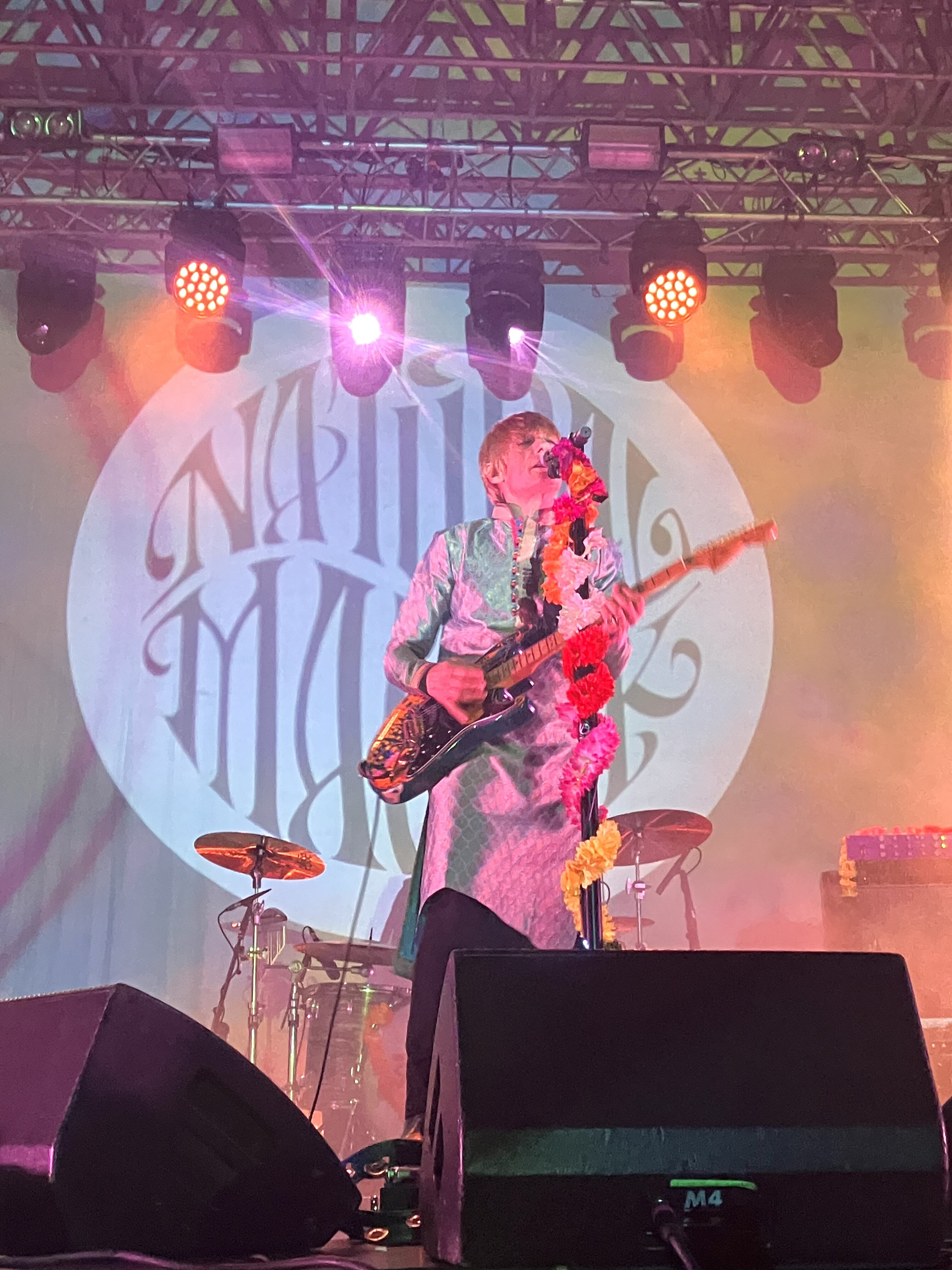
Kula Shaker performing in Glasgow, April 2024

The album was released on 2 February 2024, although originally scheduled to be released a week prior on 26 January. The album reached No. 22 in the UK Albums Chart and No. 1 in the UK Independent Albums Chart. It also climbed to No. 5 in Scotland.

Preceding the album's release, Kula Shaker released the first single, "Waves", on 28 July 2023. The second single, "Indian Record Player", was released on 13 October 2023. The final single, the title track "Natural Magick", was released on 5 January 2024.

== Tour ==
To promote the album, Kula Shaker embarked on a 10-date UK tour that ran from 22 April to 5 May 2024, which began in Cardiff, Wales and concluded in Bournemouth, England. In a press release leading up to the tour, Mills asserted that "Natural Magick feels like one of the best, if not the best studio album we've ever made, but much of it was written on the road and it's all very much designed to be played in front of a live audience. This chapter in the band's life is very much driven by live energy and that spiritual connection with the audiences which comes with it.

== Track listing ==
All tracks are written by Crispian Mills except where indicated

Natural Magick track listing
No.	Title	Writer(s)	Length
1.	"Gaslighting"	Mills, Alonza Bevan	4:06
2.	"Waves"		2:54
3.	"Natural Magick"	Mills, Alonza Bevan	4:01
4.	"Indian Record Player"	Mills, Simon Roberts, Joff Winterhart	2:44
5.	"Chura Liya (You Stole My Heart)"	R. D. Burman, Majrooh Sultanpuri	3:57
6.	"Something Dangerous"		3:46
7.	"Stay With Me Tonight"		3:36
8.	"Happy Birthday"	Bevan, Mills	4:29
9.	"Idon'twannapaymytaxes"		2:40
10.	"F-bombs"	Bevan, Jay Darlington, Mills, Paul Winterhart	2:45
11.	"Whistle and I Will Come"	Mills, Jake Gosling	3:14
12.	"Kalifornia Blues"		4:14
13.	"Give Me Tomorrow"		4:07

== Personnel ==
Adapted from liner notes:

=== Kula Shaker ===
- Crispian Mills – guitars, lead vocals, production
- Alonza Bevan – bass, vocals (co-lead on track 1), production
- Jay Darlington – Hammond organ, keyboards, backing vocals (10)
- Paul Winterhart – drums, backing vocals (10)

=== Guest musicians ===
- LaBoni Barua – co-lead vocals (5, 8)
- Alanoud Gigante – co-lead vocals (7), backing vocals (8, 9, 10, 12)
- "Carly" – backing vocals (2, 4)
- Layla Assam – backing vocals (2)
- Hari Mills – backing vocals (3, 10)
- Tamlin Darlington – backing vocals (10)
- Jane Stanness – spoken word (12)
- Heather Miles – spoken word (13)
- David Morris – whistling (11)
- Himanish Goswami – tabla and bongos (2–4, 6, 8)
- Kofi Kari Kari – congos and bells (3)
- Olivier Leclercq – sitar (8)
- Tao Sauvenière – violins (8)
- Richard Beesley – tenor and baritone saxophone (13)
- Kris Jones – trumpet (13)
- Tim Wade – trombone (13)

=== Additional personnel ===
- Kev Nixon – production, tambourine and cowbell (1, 2, 9, 12), backing vocals (10)
- Toby May – engineer
- Ash Howes – mixing
- Prabjote Osahn – string arrangements (3, 4, 6, 11, 13)
- Stylorouge – artwork

== Charts ==
Chart performance for Natural Magick
Chart (2024)	Peak position
Scottish Albums (Official Charts)	5
UK Albums (Official Charts)	22
UK Independent Albums (Official Charts)	1
