= Crispian Mills =

English rock musician and film director (born 1973)

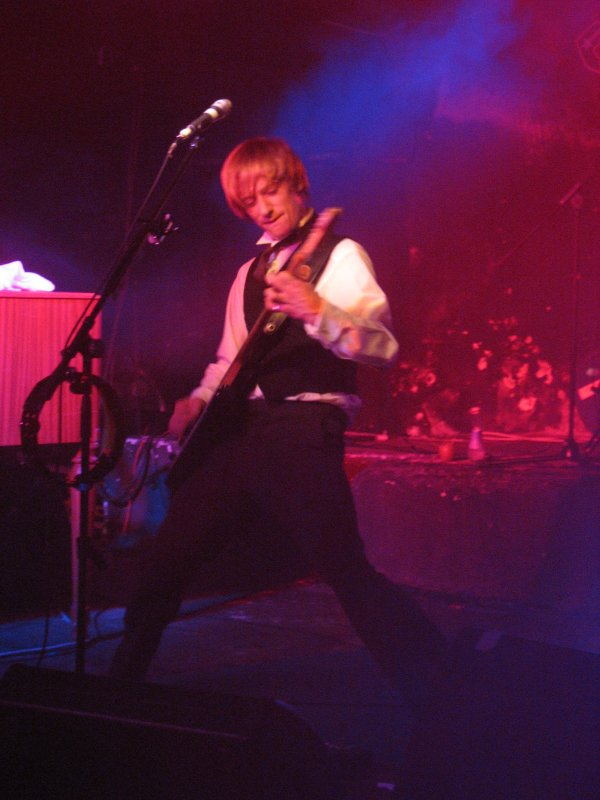
- Crispian Mills performing at Rainbow Club in Milan in 2007

Background information
- Also known as: Dodge, Krishna Kantha Das
- Born: Crispian John David Boulting; 18 January 1973 (age 53); Hammersmith, London, England
- Genres: Indie rock; alternative rock; psychedelic rock; Britpop
- Occupations: Musician, film director
- Instruments: Vocals; guitar; harmonica; sarod; tambura; ukulele; tambourine
- Years active: 1988–present
- Labels: Columbia; Cowboy; Strangefolk
- Spouse: Josephine Branfoot (m. 1995)
- Website: kulashaker.co.uk

Crispian Mills (born 18 January 1973 as Crispian John David Boulting; spiritual name Krishna Kantha Das) is an English singer-songwriter, guitarist, and film director. Active since 1988, Mills is best known as the frontman of the psychedelic indie rock band Kula Shaker. Following the band's break-up in 1999, he remained with Columbia Records (a subsidiary of Sony BMG), and toured with a set of session musicians (including a support slot for Robbie Williams) under the name Pi, although no official studio recordings were released in full. After the label rejected the Pi album, Mills disappeared for a short time, returning in 2002 as frontman and lead guitarist for back-to-basics rock outfit The Jeevas, who disbanded in 2005 to make way for a reformed Kula Shaker, who released their third album Strangefolk in 2007. In 2010 he released the album Pilgrims Progress with Kula Shaker. In 2017 the band celebrated the 20th anniversary of their album K with the release of the new record K 2.0. Mills joined the band for a sold-out UK tour to celebrate the anniversary.

Mills is the son of actress Hayley Mills and director Roy Boulting, the grandson of Sir John Mills and Mary Hayley Bell, nephew of Juliet Mills and directors John Boulting and Jonathan Mills, and half-brother to Jason Lawson.

== Early life ==
Mills was born on 18 January 1973 in Hammersmith, London, England. His mother, Hayley Mills, had made her name as a child star in the 1960s, and met Mills' father, Roy Boulting, on the set of light British comedy The Family Way. Boulting was 32 years Hayley Mills' senior, and only five years younger than her father, Sir John Mills. The pair married in 1971. The family lived on Belgrade Road, in the south-west London district Hampton, and had an additional property at Cobstone Windmill at Ibstone, Buckinghamshire. The marriage did not last, and the pair split in 1975, followed by an official divorce in 1977. At this point, Hayley was pregnant again by actor Leigh Lawson with her second son, Jason.

The new family shared their time between Hampton and Lawson's Coventry residence. Hayley put her career on hold to raise her sons during their early years, a sacrifice which to this day, Mills values very highly. The young Mills believed his grandfather to be a genuine knight in shining armour. Sir John can also be credited with introducing Mills to music, by singing old cowboy songs to send him to sleep as a child. Mills would go on to cover one of those songs, "Rio Grande" with his post-Kula Shaker band The Jeevas. "I count myself to be very fortunate," says Mills, "in having been brought up by people who are very open-minded and who are genuinely in love with the arts. If I've inherited anything from my family, it's that love of the creative process and that awareness of the privilege which being a part of it represents. That comes from my father too... I couldn't escape from it, and never felt I wanted to."

Mills attended various schools, some private, some state-run, as his mother was frequently travelling for film work. Speaking in an interview in 2016, Mills says "When I was in private schools, they called me 'common', and when I was in state schools they called me 'posh'. It made me very cynical about all these labels".

His background meant family friends were people like Richard Attenborough and Sir Laurence Olivier, although Mills has often remarked that he was rarely star-struck as they were "just people" to one accustomed to the company of famous actors. As a result of this, and his mother's experiences as a child actress, the young Mills believed that making films was to be his next step. "I grew up with pictures of my mum looking very very young, standing with John Wayne or Walt Disney. That did something to my head; I thought that was kind of normal. That's what happens: you get to 12, you start making movies. It was only when I got to 12 that I realised, obviously, that wasn't the case."

It was around this time when Mills first started to consider ideas of spirituality and mortality. "If I ever had a Road to Damascus, it was when I was 11," he recalls. "I woke up one night, at home in bed, and realised I was going to die. I don't mean 'tomorrow' or 'in a year'. It wasn't a prediction. It was just suddenly understanding fully that death would come. I remember talking about it at the time. Everyone thought there was something wrong with me." To address these new feelings on life and death, Mills borrowed the Mahābhārata, one of the two major Sanskrit epics of ancient India, from his mother, and took to reading it. He also became vegetarian, although concedes that this was largely due to meeting "a really attractive girl who was vegetarian".

Throughout his youth, Mills had been exposed to a wide variety of music. One of his earliest musical memories was "Puff, the Magic Dragon" by Peter, Paul and Mary, which he believes "summed up [his] childhood". As a general rule, Mills, uninspired by the then-current music scene, found he was able to identify with older records, which he felt had honesty and genuine youth. However he singled out "Stand and Deliver" by Adam and the Ants – the first single he ever bought – by virtue of its drama and longevity. In terms of albums, his first purchase was "Too Tough to Die" by the Ramones. However, it was hearing "You Really Got Me" by English rock group The Kinks that inspired him to become a guitarist. "It was like walking into a temple, a moment when my life changed," he says. "I'd grown up listening to Boy George and Duran Duran on the radio. But Really Got Me. Chung! This is your destiny! After that, as soon as I picked up a guitar, all I wanted to do was become brilliant. I practised, I studied tapes, I was a guitar-worshipper." Through the guitar, Mills also discovered Deep Purple, and has cited their lead guitarist Ritchie Blackmore as a major influence on his style. At Richmond upon Thames College he met future band-mate Alonza Bevan.

Later, Mills started to delve deeper into psychedelic music, and spent most of his A-Level years taking LSD and listening to The Doors. Acid gave the teenaged Mills a change of perspective, but he soon realised that drugs alone would not bring him the enlightenment he sought. Watching close friends go "over the edge" on hallucinogens ultimately convinced Mills that there were other ways of changing one's perspective.

== Career ==
Mills in an interview with a New York journalist stated, "You can sing about things like premature teenage sex, or you can sing about everlasting, universal truth." In the perspective of this Hindu philosophy his band debuted the song "Govinda" at an outdoor festival in England. "We found our way onto the Hare Krishna stage, and we just started jamming on 'Govinda'." Shortly thereafter, Mills toured India for the first time with his mystical friend and tour guide, Mathura, while the other band members stayed behind in England. He was initiated in the Gaudiya Vaishnavism tradition in 1997 and has a spiritual Hare Krishna name Krishna Kantha das. The same year he wrote a foreword to a book by Bhaktivinoda Thakur translated into English from Bengali and titled Siksastaka, an esoteric bhakti publication.

Mills briefly played in a reformed line-up of punk band X-Ray Spex under the name "Red Spectre" in 1995.

Mills became famous in the UK as the lead singer-songwriter in the Indian-influenced 90s Indie/rock band Kula Shaker in 1996. Kula Shaker's first album K became the best-selling debut album since Oasis' Definitely Maybe in the UK, and the band had a string of UK hit singles, culminating in 1997's 'Hush' which peaked at No. 2 there.

In 1997, Mills contributed vocals to the nine-minute breakbeat song "Narayan" on The Prodigy's third album The Fat of the Land.

Following Kula Shaker's break-up in 1999, he spent two years experimenting with new musical ideas, touring briefly in the UK with as part of a band called Pi. A disagreement over the quality of an album proposed for release saw Mills depart from his UK record company in 2001.

In early 2002 the speedy formation of a new band called The Jeevas with Andy Nixon and Dan McKinna (previously both of the band Straw) led to relative success, with the first album selling over 100,000 copies in Japan. Sales elsewhere were low but the band remained a hot ticket in smaller UK venues. Despite extensive touring and sizeable hardcore fanbase, The Jeevas split in early 2005, with Nixon and McKinna forming a new band named The Magic Bullet Band.

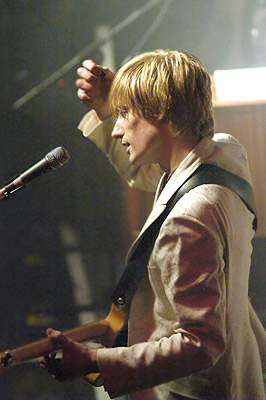
Mills performing at a 2006 gig

During 2004 The Jeevas and a reformed Kula Shaker (without original keyboardist Jay Darlington) contributed to a charity album with the Californian School of Braja, which Mills masterminded. The sessions with Kula Shaker went so well that the band decided to reform permanently. 2006 saw their return to the live scene in the UK with the addition of new keyboardist Harry Broadbent, and the release of an EP Revenge of the King. Their third album Strangefolk was released in 2007.

In June 2010 Mills released his 4th album with Kula Shaker, Pilgrims Progress.

In early 2016 Kula Shaker returned with their new album K 2.0. The band played a mostly sold-out European tour in February and March 2016. They spent the rest of the year touring across Europe, Asia and North America.

A well-received sold-out 20th anniversary tour of their debut album K followed at the end of 2016.

Mills announced another break for the band due to his commitments to more film projects.

== Swastika comments ==
In a 1997 interview with the NME, Mills commented on the use of the swastika in Hinduism saying that he "loved the (Hindu) swastika" adding "don't let (the Nazis) steal that from you" and that he would "love to have flaming swastikas on stage, just for the f**k of it". The interview resulted in a negative stream of press, with one journalist suggesting that Mills, like the Sex Pistols, and Brian Jones of The Rolling Stones, had "flirted with fascism". Mills later issued a written apology, in which he talked about his interest in how sacred spiritual symbols get hijacked by nefarious ideologies, adding that he "opposed totalitarianism in all its forms" and stood for "love and understanding".

== Films ==
In 2001, shortly after his father Roy Boulting's death, Mills began writing film scripts. His first screenplay The Winged Boy was bought by the Hollywood production company Gold Circle, but has never been made. Mills continued to write and develop material, eventually writing and co-directing A Fantastic Fear of Everything, starring Simon Pegg. The film, which tells the story of a paranoid crime writer with an irrational fear of launderettes and hedgehogs, received mixed to negative reviews. Many indie reviewers praised its visual originality and Simon Pegg's performance, which won him Best Male actor at Toronto after Dark film festival. Empire magazine gave it 3 stars. In 2018 Mills directed and co-wrote another movie project, Slaughterhouse Rulez, this time including both Simon Pegg and Nick Frost. It was also met with mixed to negative reviews.

== Personal life ==
Mills has been married to the former model Josephine Mills (née Branfoot) since 1995. They have lived in Bath, and Cornwall with their two sons.

== Discography ==
=== Albums ===
- K – Kula Shaker (1996)
- Peasants, Pigs & Astronauts – Kula Shaker (1999)
- 1,2,3,4 – The Jeevas (2002)
- Cowboys and Indians – The Jeevas (2003)
- School of Braja – School of Braja (2006)
- Strangefolk – Kula Shaker (2007)
- Pilgrims Progress – Kula Shaker (2010)
- K2.0 – Kula Shaker (2016)
- 1st Congregational Church of Eternal Love and Free Hugs – Kula Shaker (2022)
- Natural Magick – Kula Shaker (2024)
- Wormslayer - Kula Shaker (2026)

=== EPs ===
- Summer Sun E.P. – Kula Shaker (1997)
- Revenge of the King – Kula Shaker (2006)
- Freedom Lovin' People EP – Kula Shaker (2007)

=== Compilation albums ===
- Kollected – The Best Of – Kula Shaker (2002)
- Tattva – The Very Best Of – Kula Shaker (2007)

=== Singles ===
- "Tattva (Lucky 13 Mix)" – Kula Shaker (1996)
- "Grateful When You're Dead" – Kula Shaker (1996)
- "Tattva" – Kula Shaker (1996)
- "Hey Dude" – Kula Shaker (1996)
- "Govinda" – Kula Shaker (1996)
- "Hush" – Kula Shaker (1997)
- "Sound of Drums" – Kula Shaker (1998)
- "Mystical Machine Gun" – Kula Shaker (1999)
- "Shower Your Love" – Kula Shaker (1999)
- "Scary Parents" – The Jeevas (2002)
- "One Louder" – The Jeevas (2002)
- "Virginia" – The Jeevas (2002)
- "Ghost (Cowboys in the Movies)" – The Jeevas (2002)
- "Once Upon A Time in America" – The Jeevas (2003)
- "The Way You Carry On" – The Jeevas (2003)
- "Have You Ever Seen The Rain?" – The Jeevas (2003)
- "Second Sight" – Kula Shaker (2007)
- "Out on the Highway" – Kula Shaker (2007)
- "Peter Pan R.I.P" – Kula Shaker (2010)
- "Healing Hands" – Crispian Mills (2010)
- "Let Love Be (With U)" – Kula Shaker (2016)
- "Cherry Plum Tree" - Kula Shaker (2022)
- "Gimme Some Truth" - Kula Shaker (2022)
- "Christmas Time Is Here Again" - Kula Shaker (2022)
- "Waves" - Kula Shaker (2023)
- "Indian Record Player" (2023)
- "Natural Magick" (2024)
- "Rational Man" (2024)
- "Charge of the Light Brigade" (2025)
- "Good Money" (2025)
- "Lucky Number" (2026)
- "Wormslayer" (2026)

== Collaborations ==
- "Punch The Orphans Together (Yeah)" with Richard Ashcroft (1997)
