= Shoplifting (disambiguation) =

Shoplifting is the crime of stealing goods from a retail store.

Shoplifting, Shoplifter, or Shoplifters may also refer to:

- Shoplifting (band), an American punk rock band
- Shoplifting (album), an album by Straw
- Shoplifters (film), a 2018 Japanese drama film by Hirokazu Kore-eda
- "Shoplifter", a B-side to a European single of "American Idiot" by Green Day
