= Cowboys and Indians (album) =

Studio album by The Jeevas
- Released: October 6, 2003
- Genre: Rock
- Length: 46:07
- Label: Cowboy UK
- Producers: Duck Blackwell and Crispian Mills

The Jeevas chronology
1,2,3,4 (2002)	Cowboys and Indians (2003)

Cowboys and Indians is an album by The Jeevas, released October 6, 2003.

== Track listing ==
All songs by Crispian Mills, unless otherwise noted.

1. "Black & Blue"
2. "Have You Ever Seen the Rain?" (John Fogerty)
3. "Healing Hands"
4. "The Way You Carry On"
5. "I Can't Help Myself"
6. "Back Home"
7. "Que Pasa (con tu culo)?"
8. "How Much Do You Suck?"
9. "Masters of War" (Bob Dylan)
10. "Stoned Love"
11. "Girl Without a Name"
12. "Good Man Down"
13. "Rio Grande"
