= I'm Against It =

"I'm Against It" may refer to:

- "I'm Against It", a song by the Ramones on the 1978 album Road to Ruin
- "I'm Against It", a song by Groucho Marx in the 1932 film Horse Feathers
- "I'm Against It", a 2020 music video by Kula Shaker
- "Jestem przeciw" ('I'm against it'), a 2005 song by Płomień 81
