= Hey Dude (song) =

1996 single by Kula Shaker

Single by Kula Shaker

from the album K
- B-side: "Troubled Mind"; "Into the Deep"; "Drop in the Sea"; "Crispian Reading from the Mahabharata"
- Released: 26 August 1996
- Recorded: January–May 1996
- Studio: Various
- Genre: Britpop
- Length: 4:07
- Label: Columbia
- Songwriters: Crispian Mills; Kula Shaker
- Producer: John Leckie

Kula Shaker singles chronology
"Tattva" (1996)	"Hey Dude" (1996)	"Govinda" (1996)

Music video
- "Hey Dude" on YouTube

"Hey Dude" is a Britpop song by English psychedelic rock band Kula Shaker. Written by frontman Crispian Mills and Kula Shaker, the song was released as the third single (and fourth overall) from their 1996 debut studio album, K, on 26 August 1996. Produced by John Leckie, "Hey Dude" became the band's joint-highest-charting song in the United Kingdom (alongside "Hush"), peaking at number two in September 1996. Internationally, the single charted in Australia, Ireland, and the Netherlands, as well as on the Canadian and US rock charts. In Australia, the song was ranked at number 60 on the Triple J Hottest 100 of 1996.

== Release ==
"Hey Dude" was released in the United Kingdom on 26 August 1996 across four formats: two CD singles, a 7-inch vinyl single, and a cassette single. The first CD contains "Troubled Mind", "Grateful When You're Dead", and "Into the Deep" as B-sides while the second disc includes "Tattva", "Drop in the Sea", and "Crispian Reading from the Mahabharata" as additional tracks. The 7-inch and cassette singles consist of "Hey Dude" and "Troubled Mind", and a European format replacing that latter track with "Grateful When You're Dead" was also issued. In Japan, an extra song called "Red Balloon" appears on the CD single alongside the other tracks from the second UK CD.

== Chart performance ==
On the week beginning 1 September 1996, "Hey Dude" debuted on the UK Singles Chart at number two, its peak position, with sales of 65,000. This gave Kula Shaker their highest-charting single in the UK, along with 1997's "Hush", as well as their longest-charting hit, spending 10 weeks in the UK top 100. At the end of 1996, the song came in at number 84 on the UK year-end chart. In May 2020, the British Phonographic Industry (BPI) awarded the song a silver certification for sales and streams of over 200,000 units. According to the Official Charts Company, "Hey Dude" is the UK's 39th-best-selling Britpop song as of August 2020.

Outside the UK, "Hey Dude" charted in several other countries. In Ireland, it became Kula Shaker's first single to reach the Irish Singles Chart top 30, peaking at number 29. In September 1996, the song debuted and peaked at number 18 on the Eurochart Hot 100 from its UK sales alone. Elsewhere in Europe, the song appeared on the Netherlands' Tip charts, reaching number 16 on the Dutch Top 40 Tipparade and number 12 on the Single Top 100 Tipparade. On Australia's ARIA Singles Chart, the single debuted within the top 100 on 3 November 1996 and peaked at number 58. In Canada, the song became the band's second single to chart, after "Tattva", rising to number 16 on the RPM Alternative 30 ranking on 28 April 1997. On 1 March 1997, the track debuted on the US Billboard Modern Rock Tracks chart, peaking at number 25 the following month.

== Track listings ==
UK CD1 and European CD2

1. "Hey Dude"
2. "Troubled Mind"
3. "Grateful When You're Dead"
4. "Into the Deep"

UK CD2 and Australian CD single

1. "Hey Dude"
2. "Tattva"
3. "Drop in the Sea"
4. "Crispian Reading from the Mahabharata"

UK 7-inch and cassette single

1. "Hey Dude"
2. "Troubled Mind"

European CD1

1. "Hey Dude"
2. "Grateful When You're Dead"

Japanese CD single

1. "Hey Dude"
2. "Tattva"
3. "Drop in the Sea"
4. "Red Balloon"
5. "Crispian Reading from the Mahabharata"

== Credits and personnel ==
Credits are taken from the UK CD1 liner notes and the K album booklet.

Studios

- Recorded between January and May 1996 at various studios

Personnel

- Kula Shaker – writing
  - Crispian Mills – writing, vocals, acoustic guitars, electric guitars, tambura
  - Alonza Bevan – backing vocals, bass, piano, tabla
  - Jay Darlington – organ, Mellotron, piano
  - Paul Winterhart – drums
- John Leckie – production, engineering
- Stephen Harris – mixing
- John Davis – mastering
- Stylorouge – design and art direction
- David Scheinmann – photography

== Charts ==
=== Weekly charts ===
Chart (1996–1997)	Peak position
Australia (ARIA)	58
Canada Rock/Alternative (RPM)	16
Europe (Eurochart Hot 100)	18
Ireland (IRMA)	29
Netherlands (Dutch Top 40 Tipparade)	16
Netherlands (Single Top 100 Tipparade)	12
Scottish Singles Sales (Official Charts)	3
UK Singles (Official Charts)	2
US Modern Rock Tracks (Billboard)	25

=== Year-end charts ===
Chart (1996)	Position
UK Singles (OCC)	84

== Certifications ==
Region	Certification	Certified units/sales
United Kingdom (BPI)	Silver	200,000^{‡}
^{‡} Sales+streaming figures based on certification alone.
