= K 2.0 =

Studio album by Kula Shaker
- Released: February 12, 2016
- Recorded: 2015
- Genres: Rock, psychedelic rock, raga rock
- Length: 42:48
- Label: StrangeF.O.L.K.
- Producers: Crispian Mills, Alonza Bevan

Kula Shaker chronology
Pilgrims Progress (2010)	K 2.0 (2016)	1st Congregational Church of Eternal Love and Free Hugs (2022)

Professional ratings
Aggregate scores
Source	Rating
Metacritic	58/100
Review scores
Source	Rating
AllMusic	3/5 stars
Drowned in Sound	6/10
The Guardian	3/5 stars
Under the Radar	5/10

K 2.0 is the fifth studio album by English psychedelic raga rock band Kula Shaker. Recorded in 2015 at State Of The Ark, London, England and The Tea Rooms, Lompret, Belgium. Released on 12 February 2016 on CD, vinyl and digital download.

The name of the album is based on the fact that it was released 20 years after their debut album, K, and was considered a follow up, in that it was created in the same spirit as K. The mountain in the background on the album is K2.

== Track listing ==
No.	Title	Length
1.	"Infinite Sun"	4:37
2.	"Holy Flame"	3:35
3.	"Death of Democracy"	2:54
4.	"Let Love Be (With U)"	4:04
5.	"Here Come My Demons"	6:19
6.	"33 Crows"	3:04
7.	"Oh Mary"	3:54
8.	"High Noon"	3:14
9.	"Hari Bol (The Sweetest Sweet)"	2:00
10.	"Get Right Get Ready"	3:56
11.	"Mountain Lifter"	5:11

Bonus track

US bonus track
No.	Title	Length
12.	"2 STYX"	3:30

== Charts ==
Chart (2016)	Peak position
Belgian Albums (Ultratop Flanders)	111
Dutch Albums (Album Top 100)	68
German Albums (Offizielle Top 100)	84
Italian Albums (FIMI)	59
UK Albums (Official Charts)	32
