= Truth Hurts =

Truth Hurts or The Truth Hurts may refer to:

== Film, television and radio ==
- The Truth Hurts, a 1993 skateboard film from Thrasher magazine
- "Truth Hurts", a 2006 episode of McLeod's Daughters
- "The Truth Hurts" (Kim Possible), a Kim Possible episode

== Music ==
- Truth Hurts (singer) (born 1971), American R&B singer

=== Albums ===
- The Truth Hurts, a 1994 album by Pro-Pain
- The Truth Hurts, a 2000 album by Ed O.G.
- The Truth Hurts, a 2021 mixtape by Drakeo the Ruler

=== Songs ===
- "Truth Hurts" (song), 2017 single by Lizzo that gained popularity in 2019
- "Truth Hurts", a song by Deep Purple from their 1990 album Slaves and Masters
- "Truth Hurts", a 2001 single by Thirteen:13
- "Truth Hurts", a song by Usher from his 2004 album Confessions

== Other ==
- The Truth Hurts, a 1985 book by Jimmy Piersall
