= Peasants, Pigs & Astronauts =

Studio album by Kula Shaker
- Released: 8 March 1999
- Genres: Britpop, psychedelic rock, raga rock
- Length: 54:11
- Label: Columbia
- Producers: Bob Ezrin, George Drakoulias, Rick Rubin

Kula Shaker chronology
K (1996)	Peasants, Pigs & Astronauts (1999)	Kollected – The Best Of (2002)
Strangefolk (2007)	Peasants, Pigs & Astronauts – 10th Anniversary Edition (2010)	Pilgrims Progress (2010)

Peasants, Pigs & Astronauts is the second album by the British indie and psychedelic rock band Kula Shaker.

== Recording ==
Initial recording sessions for the album were produced by John Leckie but the band soon decided to bring in producers George Drakoulias and Rick Rubin instead. Eventually Drakoulias and Rubin were rejected by the band and Bob Ezrin was brought in to complete the album. As a result of this, the production credits for the album's lead single, "Sound of Drums", name Drakoulias and Rubin as producers, while the rest of Peasants, Pigs & Astronauts is produced by Ezrin. Like its predecessor, K, the album continues the band's hybrid of 1960s-style psychedelic rock, groovy indie pop, and Indian instrumentation, albeit with a more progressive rock slant than on previous releases. Musically, many of the songs make use of Beatles-influenced psychedelic effects, swirling guitars, and Indian chants. This musical eclecticism prompted the band themselves to refer to Peasants, Pigs & Astronauts as their "kitchen sink album".

The album was partly recorded at the Astoria recording studio, a houseboat-studio owned by Pink Floyd guitarist, David Gilmour. During production, the album was given the working title of Strangefolk, as lead vocalist Crispian Mills revealed during a BBC Radio 2 interview on 10 September 2007. Mills explained that the album's title was only changed to Peasants, Pigs & Astronauts at the last minute before release. However, the rejected album title was later reused for the band's 2007 comeback album, Strangefolk.

In addition, Peasants, Pigs & Astronauts was originally intended to feature the song "Strangefolk", a 10-minute-long track that began with the spoken introduction "In the beginning was the word, and the word was...'Om Keshavaya namah aum'." Ultimately, this track was not released on the album but an excerpt of it was included as a hidden track on the 2002 compilation album, Kollected: The Best of Kula Shaker. Another song entitled "Strangefolk" was included on the 2007 reunion album but despite its identical title, this song is not the same as the Peasants, Pigs & Astronauts outtake. The full version was eventually released on the anniversary edition of the album as a bonus track.

== Release and legacy ==
Professional ratings
Review scores
Source	Rating
AllMusic	3/5 stars
Los Angeles Daily News	2/4 stars
Wall of Sound	89/100

The album was released on 8 March 1999 and reached #9 in the UK Albums Chart, during a chart stay of 10 weeks. It was less successful in the U.S., however, where it failed to break into the Billboard 200 album chart. It was preceded in April 1998 by the "Sound of Drums" single which reached #3 on the UK Singles Chart. Two further singles were taken from Peasants, Pigs & Astronauts: "Mystical Machine Gun", which was released concurrently with the album and peaked at #14 in the UK, and "Shower Your Love", which was released in May 1999 and also reached #14 on the UK charts. None of the album's accompanying singles charted on the Billboard Hot 100 in America.

Peasants, Pigs & Astronauts was re-released in a 10th Anniversary, 2 CD edition on 20 January 2010. The 10th Anniversary edition included an expanded running order for the original album, with the outtake song "Strangefolk" included, as the band originally intended. It also featured previously unreleased demos, alternate versions of songs, and new artwork.

Peasants, Pigs & Astronauts was placed at number 36 in Q magazine's 2006 list, "The 50 Worst Albums Ever!"

== Track listing ==
=== 1999 original edition ===
1. "Great Hosannah" (Crispian Mills)
2. "Mystical Machine Gun" (Crispian Mills, Kula Shaker)
3. "S.O.S." (Crispian Mills, Kula Shaker)
4. "Radhe Radhe" (traditional, arranged by Crispian Mills, Gouri Choudhury)
5. "I'm Still Here" (Crispian Mills)
6. "Shower Your Love" (Crispian Mills)
7. "108 Battles (Of the Mind)" (Crispian Mills, Alonza Bevan)
8. "Sound of Drums" (Crispian Mills, Kula Shaker)
9. "Timeworm" (Crispian Mills, Alonza Bevan)
10. "Last Farewell" (Crispian Mills, Kula Shaker)
11. "Golden Avatar" (Crispian Mills, Kula Shaker)
12. "Namami Nanda-Nandana" [aka "Nanda-nandanāṣṭakaḿ"] (traditional, arranged by Crispian Mills)
13. "Stotra" [hidden track]

=== 2010 deluxe edition ===
On 20 January 2010 a deluxe edition was re-issued by StrangeFOLK Records Band's Label featured:

- Numbered CD booklet (this edition limited to 3000).
- 4 postcards of original ideas for the artwork
- 2010 artwork box and shrink wrapped

Disc 1 – "The Album"

1. "Great Hosannah" (Crispian Mills) – 6:07
2. "Mystical Machine Gun" (Crispian Mills, Kula Shaker) – 5:41
3. "S.O.S." (Crispian Mills, Kula Shaker) – 2:55
4. "Radhe Radhe" (traditional, arranged by Crispian Mills, Gouri Choudhury) – 2:49
5. "I'm Still Here" (Crispian Mills) – 1:31
6. "Shower Your Love" (Crispian Mills) – 3:39
7. "108 Battles (Of the Mind)" (Crispian Mills, Alonza Bevan) [new ending!] – 3:15
8. "Sound of Drums" (Crispian Mills, Kula Shaker) – 4:27
9. "Timeworm" (Crispian Mills, Alonza Bevan) – 4:02
10. "Last Farewell" (Crispian Mills, Kula Shaker) – 2:46
11. "Golden Avatar" (Crispian Mills, Kula Shaker) – 4:29
12. "Namami Nanda Nandana" (traditional, arranged by Crispian Mills) – 5:12
13. "Strangefolk" [the original title track] – 5:58
14. "Stotra" [Hidden track] – 2:22

Disc 2 – "Astronauts Anthology"

1. "Sound of Love" (Bearsville Studios Session, which became "Sound of Drums") – 6:10
2. "Avalonia" (B-side) – 2:17
3. "Golden Avatar" (band demo) – 4:32
4. "Strangefolk" (band demo) – 5:05
5. Roger Morton Interview with Crispian and Alonza recorded on 13 November 2009 in London about the making of Peasants, Pigs & Astronauts (Parts 1–9) – 46:03

== Personnel ==
Kula Shaker

- Alonza Bevan – bass, backing vocals, acoustic guitar loops
- Paul Winter-Hart – drums, symbols
- Jay Darlington – Hammond organ, Wurlitzer electric piano, Creamy Analog, Farfisa & Acetone Electric Organs
- Crispian Mills – vocals, electric and acoustic guitar, harmonica, loud cannon

Additional musicians

- The Mighty Horn Assortment – brass
- Brett Findlay, Chakrini, Madhava, Mathura Das, Percy, Shep & Dodge, Yogamaya – mrdunga, kartells, congas, bongos, conches, banging things
- Graham Pattison – loops and soundscapes

Production

- Bob Ezrin – producer (with Crispian Mills)
- Fulton Dingley – engineer
- East End Management – management
- Stylorouge – art direction, design
- Dan Abbott – booklet collages, suit design
- Paula Keenan – suit styling
- Tim O'Donnell – suit wearing
- Jeff Cottenden – photography
- Tim Hetherington – photography assistance
- Jill Furmanovsky, Sean Alquist – band photography

== Charts ==
Chart performance for Peasants, Pigs & Astronauts
Chart (1999)	Peak position
Australian Albums (ARIA)	36
Austrian Albums (Ö3 Austria)	31
Belgian Albums (Ultratop Flanders)	38
Dutch Albums (Album Top 100)	63
Finnish Albums (Suomen virallinen lista)	17
German Albums (Offizielle Top 100)	33
Norwegian Albums (VG-lista)	6
Scottish Albums (Official Charts)	7
Swedish Albums (Sverigetopplistan)	26
Swiss Albums (Schweizer Hitparade)	41
UK Albums (Official Charts)	9

== Certifications ==
Certifications for Peasants, Pigs & Astronauts
Region	Certification	Certified units/sales
Japan (RIAJ)	Gold	100,000^{^}
United Kingdom (BPI)	Gold	100,000^{^}
^{^} Shipments figures based on certification alone.
