= Pilgrims Progress (album) =

Studio album by Kula Shaker
- Released: 28 June 2010
- Recorded: 2009 – early 2010, Lompret, Belgium
- Genre: Rock
- Length: 41:42
- Label: StrangeF.O.L.K.
- Producers: Crispian Mills, Alonza Bevan

Kula Shaker chronology
Peasants, Pigs & Astronauts - 10th Anniversary Edition (2010)	Pilgrims Progress (2010)	K 2.0 (2016)

Pilgrims Progress is the fourth studio album by Kula Shaker and was released on 28 June 2010. The first single to be taken from the album was "Peter Pan R.I.P", which was made available to download as an MP3 from the band's website on 22 April 2010. A three-track "Peter Pan R.I.P" EP was later made available on the iTunes Store on 18 June 2010. The album's title is a deliberate misspelling of John Bunyan's story, The Pilgrim's Progress.

Pilgrims Progress was released in three different versions: a standard twelve-track album; a limited edition deluxe box set, with a bonus CD of unreleased songs and demos; and a super deluxe box set, featuring the regular deluxe package, along with a vinyl LP of the album and a T-shirt. The super deluxe edition is limited to 300 copies and is signed by the cover artist Chris Hopewell.

The CD album artwork for the standard twelve-track album erroneously lists three bonus tracks that do not actually appear on the album outside of Japan.

Professional ratings
Review scores
Source	Rating
Melodic	3/5 stars
MusicOMH	4/5 stars
PopMatters	7/10
Slant Magazine	4/5 stars

== Track listing ==
All music composed by Crispian Mills/Alonza Bevan.

1. "Peter Pan R.I.P" – 3:33
2. "Ophelia" – 3:07
3. "Modern Blues" – 3:46
4. "Only Love" – 3:12
5. "All Dressed Up (and Ready to Fall in Love)" – 3:30
6. "Cavalry" – 2:02
7. "Ruby" – 3:06
8. "Figure It Out" – 3:32
9. "Barbara Ella" – 3:44
10. "When a Brave Needs a Maid" – 2:42
11. "To Wait Till I Come" – 2:57
12. "Winter's Call" – 6:29

=== Deluxe edition bonus CD: Lost and Proud ===
1. "Intro" – 0:32
2. "Sister Breeze" – 3:06
3. "High in a Heaven" – 4:12
4. "Space Caravan" – 2:52
5. "Let It In" [Demo] – 3:53
6. "Light Years Ahead of Our Time" [Demo] – 3:22
7. "The Phantom" – 2:38
8. "Witches & Wine" [Demo] – 2:46
9. "Sweet Sympathy" – 3:14
10. "Peter Pan R.I.P" [video]

=== Japanese Version ===
1. "Peter Pan R.I.P" – 3:33
2. "Figure It Out" – 3:32
3. "Ophelia" – 3:07
4. "Modern Blues" – 3:46
5. "All Dressed Up (and Ready to Fall in Love)" – 3:30
6. "Ruby" – 3:06
7. "Only Love" – 3:12
8. "Barbara Ella" – 3:44
9. "Cavalry" – 2:02
10. "When a Brave Needs a Maid" – 2:42
11. "To Wait Till I Come" – 2:57
12. "Winter's Call" – 6:29
13. "Interlude" – 0:32
14. "Space Caravan" – 2:52
15. "High in a Heaven" – 4:12
16. "Sweet Sympathy" – 3:14

== Personnel ==
Kula Shaker

- Crispian Mills – lead guitar, lead vocals
- Alonza Bevan – bass guitar, backing vocals
- Paul Winterhart – drums
- Harry Broadbent – organ

Additional Personnel

- Audrey Evans – backing vocals
- Christian Gerard – cello on "Peter Pan R.I.P" and "Ruby"
- Himanesh Goswami – tabla on "All Dressed Up (and Ready to Fall in Love)"
- Vijai Krishna das – tabla on "All Dressed Up (and Ready to Fall in Love)"
- Ben Castle – flute on "When a Brave Needs a Maid"
- Sheema Mukherjee – sitar on "All Dressed Up (and Ready to Fall in Love)"
