= Govinda (Kula Shaker song) =

1996 single by Kula Shaker

Single by Kula Shaker

from the album K
- B-side: "Gokula"; "The Leek"; "Temple of Everlasting Light"
- Released: 11 November 1996
- Recorded: January–May 1996
- Studio: Various
- Genre: Britpop; psychedelic rock
- Length: 4:57
- Label: Columbia
- Songwriters: Crispian Mills; Kula Shaker
- Producer: John Leckie

Kula Shaker singles chronology
"Hey Dude" (1996)	"Govinda" (1996)	"Hush" (1997)

"Govinda" is a song by British rock band Kula Shaker, released on their debut album, K (1996). Sung entirely in Sanskrit, the song includes Indian influences and tambura and tabla instrumentation. "Govinda" was issued as a single on 11 November 1996 and peaked at number seven on the UK Singles Chart.

Kula Shaker made a music video for the song, directed by Michael Geoghegan. The cover artwork for the single featured a Longines Conquest watch, with the band logo and song title in place of the Longines branding. An alternative version of the track, called "Govinda '97, Hari & ST. George", appeared on Kula Shaker's Summer Sun EP, released in July 1997.

== Background ==
Lead singer and guitarist Crispian Mills said that the song was born out of an improvisation and based on a Hindu prayer to Krishna. The words Govinda jaya jaya literally mean "Krishna (the Divine Cowherd), Glory, Glory". The text is taken from a Sanskrit devotional chant, titled "Govinda Jaya Jaya". The latter was previously recorded in 1970 by devotees from the London Radha Krishna Temple and released as the B-side of their single "Govinda" (a different song), produced by George Harrison.

== Track listings ==
UK CD1

1. "Govinda" (radio mix) – 3:46
2. "Gokula" – 2:56
3. "Hey Dude" (live at The Astoria) – 5:30
4. "The Leek" – 3:40

UK CD2

1. "Govinda, Hari & St. George" – 3:59
2. "Gokula" – 2:56
3. "Govinda" (Monkey Mafia Pigsy's vision) – 6:56
4. "Govinda" (Monkey Mafia Ten to Ten) – 4:31

UK 7-inch single

A1. "Govinda" (radio mix) – 3:46
B1. "Gokula" – 2:56
B2. "Temple of Everlasting Light" – 2:33

UK cassette single

A. "Govinda" (radio mix) – 3:46
B. "Gokula" – 2:56

European and Australian CD single

1. "Govinda" (radio mix)
2. "Gokula"
3. "Hey Dude" (live at The Astoria)
4. "Drop in the Ocean"
5. "Govinda" (Monkey Mafia Pigsy's vision)
6. "Govinda" (Monkey Mafia Ten to Ten)

== Credits and personnel ==
Credits are taken from the UK CD1 liner notes and the K album booklet.

Studios

- Recorded between January and May 1996 at various studios

Personnel

- Kula Shaker – writing
  - Crispian Mills – writing, vocals, acoustic guitars, electric guitars, tambura
  - Alonza Bevan – backing vocals, bass, piano
  - Jay Darlington – organ, Mellotron, piano
  - Paul Winterhart – drums
- Gauri – backing vocals
- Himangshu Goswami – tabla
- John Leckie – production, mixing engineering
- John Davis – mastering
- Stylorouge – image creation and Graphic Precision
- Trevor Rogers – photography
- Zefa – photography

== Charts ==
Chart (1996)	Peak position
Europe (Eurochart Hot 100)	32
Ireland (IRMA)	23
Scotland Singles (OCC)	4
UK Singles (OCC)	7
