= Brett Findlay =

British film and stage actor

- Born: 30 May 1972 (age 54); Somerset, England
- Years active: 1985–present
- Spouse: Jemilah Findlay (div 2021)

Brett Findlay (born 30 May 1972) is a British film and stage actor.

Findlay trained at the Drama Studio London. He has two children a daughter, Akiko and a son, Masao.

He had a cameo part in Beyond the Fire, the award-winning Best Film (UK Feature) London Independent Film Festival and was principal actor in the 2008 thriller Dark Rage. In his previous career as a musician he is most noted as percussionist with Kula Shaker, the English psychedelic rock band. He also played percussion on Toploader's album Onka's Big Moka.

== Filmography ==
- Beyond the Fire Film (2010)
- Dark Rage Film (2009)
- Remedy Short (2009)
- Family Affairs TV (2003)
- I Was Never Young Short (2003)

== Theatre ==
- The Time of Your Life (2008)
- Giving Gorillas Passports (2009)
- No Shame, No Fear (2006)
- The Pipe Manufacturers Blue Book (2005)
- Much Ado About Nothing (2005)
- The Constant Wife (2004)
- The Country Wife (2004)

== Discography ==
- Peasants, Pigs and Astronauts (1999)
- Onka's Big Moka (1999)
