= Revenge of the King =

EP by Kula Shaker
- Released: 31 March 2006
- Recorded: 2006
- Genres: Rock, psychedelic rock
- Producers: Sean Geonoki, Shep & Dodge

Kula Shaker chronology
Kollected – The Best Of (2002)	Revenge of the King (2006)	Tattva: The Very Best of Kula Shaker (2007)

Revenge of the King is an EP by Kula Shaker, released on 31 March 2006, the first Kula Shaker release since the band reformed. It was originally only available as a download from iTunes; later it was released as a limited edition 10" vinyl EP, sold only at concerts and through the band's website. It was subsequently released in Japan on CD with an additional bonus track and the alternate title, Garage EP.

The song "Diktator of the Free World" was re-recorded for the band's third album, Strangefolk, and renamed "Great Dictator (of the Free World)". The song's lyrics were also changed significantly for its appearance on Strangefolk. "6 ft. Down" was also re-recorded for Kula Shaker's third album and was renamed "6ft Down Blues".

== Track listing ==
1. "Revenge of the King"
2. "Diktator of the Free World"
3. "Troubadour"
4. "6 ft. Down"
5. "Govinda" [Live] *

* Govinda was only included in the Japanese release.
