= Sound of Drums (song) =

1998 single by Kula Shaker

Single by Kula Shaker

from the album Peasants, Pigs & Astronauts
- B-side: "Hurry on Sundown (Hari Om Sundown)"; "Reflections of Love"; "Fairyland"; "The One That Got Away"; "Smile"
- Released: 20 April 1998
- Length: 4:32 (album version); 4:15 (radio edit)
- Label: Columbia
- Composer: Kula Shaker
- Lyricist: Crispian Mills
- Producers: Rick Rubin; George Drakoulias

Kula Shaker singles chronology
"Hush" (1997)	"Sound of Drums" (1998)	"Mystical Machine Gun" (1999)

Audio
- "Sound of Drums" on YouTube

"Sound of Drums" is a song by English psychedelic rock band Kula Shaker, released as the lead single from their second studio album, Peasants, Pigs & Astronauts (1999). With lyrics by frontman Crispian Mills and music composed by the whole band, the track takes musical inspiration from American rock band the Doors and received production from Rick Rubin and George Drakoulias, as Mills wanted the track to have a more "American" sound than their previous works. "Sound of Drums" was issued as a single on 20 April 1998 and debuted at number three on the UK Singles Chart the same month, becoming Kula Shaker's fifth and final top-10 hit in the United Kingdom.

== Background ==
"Sound of Drums" was conceived in 1997, during recording sessions at Ocean Way Studios in Los Angeles. According to Crispian Mills, the band recruited Rick Rubin and George Drakoulias to produce the track since their previous album, K (1996), did not properly emulate the energy of their live performances. Mills stated that he was happy to be working in California since he could associate with people from different cultures and utilise their ideas for Kula Shaker's music. He also wanted to focus more on the song's instrumentation, centring it around the Hammond organ while keeping the band's 1960s influences intact.

== Release and promotion ==
In late March, Columbia Records began promoting "Sound of Drums" in the UK with a poster campaign and radio airplay. The week before its release, this promotion expanded to include full-page ads in various music publications. Kula Shaker also commenced a limited-access 12-date tour in the UK to demonstrate the tracks they had already recorded for Peasants, Pigs & Astronauts, and they also played at The Viper Room in Los Angeles to evaluate American reactions.

Following copious airplay, "Sound of Drums" was released commercially in the UK on 20 April 1998 across three formats: two CD singles and a cassette single. The first CD single contains the album version of "Sound of Drums" along with B-sides "Hurry on Sundown (Hari Om Sundown)" (a Hawkwind cover), "Fairyland", and "Reflections of Love" from the short film of the same name. For CD2, the album version is switched out for the radio edit, "Hurry on Sundown" is retained, and two new tracks appear: "The One That Got Away" and "Smile", the latter of which also from Reflections of Love. The cassette single contains only the album version of "Sound of Drums" and "Hurry on Sundown". On Peasants, Pigs & Astronauts, released on 8 March 1999, the song appears as the eighth track.

== Reception ==
On the issue of 11 April 1998, British trade paper Music Week reviewed "Sound of Drums", noting its Doors-influenced sound and "anthemic" lyrics. British columnist James Masterton also compared the song to works by the Doors, calling it "energetic" but criticising its originality, writing that "Smash Mouth's Walking On The Sun may have been the more effective Doors pastiche." Upon its release, "Sound of Drums" debuted and peaked at number three on the UK Singles Chart, becoming Kula Shaker's fifth and final top-10 hit in the UK and staying in the top 100 for eight weeks. On the Eurochart Hot 100, the single reached number 16 during its second week on the ranking. Outside the UK, the song charted in Ireland but did not reach the top 30.

== Track listings ==
UK CD1

1. "Sound of Drums" (album version) – 4:32
2. "Hurry on Sundown (Hari Om Sundown)" – 4:38
3. "Reflections of Love" (from the short film Reflections of Love) – 2:11
4. "Fairyland" (featuring Don Pecker) – 3:20

UK CD2

1. "Sound of Drums" (radio edit) – 4:15
2. "Hurry on Sundown (Hari Om Sundown)" – 4:38
3. "The One That Got Away" – 3:21
4. "Smile" (from the short film Reflections of Love) – 2:21

UK cassette single

1. "Sound of Drums" (album version) – 4:32
2. "Hurry on Sundown (Hari Om Sundown)" – 4:38

== Personnel ==
Personnel are taken from the UK CD1 liner notes and the Peasants, Pigs & Astronauts album booklet.

- Kula Shaker – music
  - Crispian Mills – lyrics, vocals, acoustic guitars, electric guitars, co-production
  - Alonza Bevan – backing vocals, acoustic guitar loops, bass
  - Jay Darlington – Wurlitzer piano, organs, keyboards
  - Paul Winterhart – drums
- Graham Pattison – loops and soundscapes
- Rick Rubin – production
- George Drakoulias – production
- Fulton Dingley – mixing
- Sylvia Massy – engineering
- Jim Scott – engineering
- Stylorouge – artwork design
- Daniel Abbott – illustration

== Charts ==
=== Weekly charts ===
Chart (1998)	Peak position
Europe (Eurochart Hot 100)	16
Scottish Singles Sales (Official Charts)	3
UK Singles (Official Charts)	3

=== Year-end charts ===
Chart (1998)	Position
UK Singles (OCC)	156
