= Strangefolk (album) =

Studio album by Kula Shaker
- Released: (Japan) 27 June 2007 (United Kingdom) 20 August 2007 (United States) 19 February 2008
- Genre: Psychedelic rock
- Length: 52:12
- Labels: StrangeF.O.L.K., CookingVinyl USA
- Producers: Tchad Blake, Chris Sheldon

Kula Shaker chronology
Tattva: The Very Best of Kula Shaker (2007)	Strangefolk (2007)	Peasants, Pigs & Astronauts – 10th Anniversary Edition (2010)

Professional ratings
Aggregate scores
Source	Rating
Metacritic	54/100
Review scores
Source	Rating
AllMusic	2.5/5 stars
Drowned in Sound	4/10
God Is in the TV	4/5 stars
NME	2/10
PopMatters	5/10
Slant	3/5 stars
Uncut	1.5/5 stars

Strangefolk is the third studio album by English psychedelic rock band Kula Shaker, the first album since the band reformed in 2004. The album has received mixed reviews since its release. It entered the UK charts at number 69.

== Production ==
Strangefolk was produced in collaboration with an all-star team of hit makers and Grammy winners, including Tchad Blake (Peter Gabriel, Crowded House), Sam Williams (Supergrass) and Chris Sheldon (The Foo Fighters, Pixies).

== Critical reception ==
Strangefolk was met with "mixed or average" reviews from critics. At Metacritic, which assigns a weighted average rating out of 100 to reviews from mainstream publications, this release received an average score of 54 based on 8 reviews.

In a review for AllMusic, critic reviewer Stephen Thomas Erlewine wrote: "The British quartet is impervious to time just as they are immune to criticism; they are what they are and nothing will change them, as their 2007 album Strange Folk proves. Ten years on from their briefly successful Noel-rock era debut K, the band sounds exactly the same." At Drowned in Sound, Rob Webb gave a four out of ten stars, explaining the album has "nothing as immediately arresting or as good" as the band's debut album. Jonathan Keefe of Slant Magazine said: "More than a decade removed from their commercial peak, however, Strange Folk should play well to the diehards who remain from their once-sizable fanbase. The Doors-style organ riffs and the trippy flourishes of sitars and finger-cymbals still typify the band's sound; with their fuzzy guitar riffs and a retro fetish that spans centuries rather than decades."

== Track listing ==
Strangefolk track listing
No.	Title	Length
1.	"Out on the Highway"	3:53
2.	"Second Sight"	3:44
3.	"Die for Love"	3:26
4.	"Great Dictator (Of the Free World)"	3:14
5.	"Strangefolk"	1:27
6.	"Song of Love / Narayana"	5:30
7.	"Shadowlands"	4:10
8.	"Fool That I Am"	3:55
9.	"Hurricane Season"	6:03
10.	"Ol' Jack Tar"	3:37
11.	"6ft Down Blues"	3:55
12.	"Dr. Kitt"	4:38
13.	"Persephone"	4:40

== Personnel ==
Band members

- Alonza Bevan – bass, vocals, acoustic guitar
- Paul Winter-Hart – drums
- Crispian Mills – lead vocals, guitar, harmonica
- Harry B. Broadbent – piano, Hammond organ, vocals

Additional musician

- Indira Dasi – vocals
- Johnny Kalsi – dhol
- Larli Geary – vocals
- Lalit Krishna – vocals
- Bethany Porter – cello
- Kate Robey – cello
- Dominic Glover – trumpet
- Anthony Bevan − violin
- Emma Hooper – viola
- Ben Castle – saxophone

Production

- Tchad Blake − producer
- Sam Williams
- Richard Haines – engineer
- Louis Reed – engineer
- Peter Hanson – engineer
- Chris Sheldon – mixing, producer
- John Dent – mastering
- David Brinkworth – mixing, producer

== Charts ==
Chart performance for Strangefolk
Chart (2007)	Peak position
Belgian Albums (Ultratop Wallonia)	85
Scottish Albums (Official Charts)	69
UK Albums (Official Charts)	69
