= Boomslang (album) =

Studio album by Johnny Marr + the Healers
- Released: 4 February 2003
- Recorded: 2000 at Clear, Manchester
- Genres: Alternative rock; indie rock
- Length: 50:40
- Label: Artistdirect/iMusic
- Producer: Johnny Marr

Johnny Marr + the Healers chronology
Boomslang (2003)	The Messenger (by Johnny Marr) (2013)

Alternative cover

Professional ratings
Aggregate scores
Source	Rating
Metacritic	53/100
Review scores
Source	Rating
AllMusic	3.5/5 stars
Alternative Press	2/5 stars
Entertainment Weekly	C+
The Guardian	3/5 stars
Mojo	3/5 stars
Pitchfork	3.7/10
PopMatters	5/10
Q	2/5 stars
Rolling Stone	2/5 stars
Uncut	4/5 stars

Boomslang is the only album by Johnny Marr + the Healers. It was released in 2003 through Artistdirect and iMusic. The band consisted of Zak Starkey, drummer for the Who and son of Ringo Starr, and Kula Shaker bassist Alonza Bevan, with Marr playing guitars, lead vocals and keyboards. The literal definition of the word "boomslang" is "a venomous, tree-dwelling snake... of tropical and southern Africa". The expression "I got boomslang..." in South Africa means to get caught up in something (like a boomslang snake hanging from a tree.) For example, "I was about to leave work when I got boomslang by a customer who needed something, and had to stay late."

The 2001 single "The Last Ride" – and its B-sides "Need It" and "Long Gone" – were included in the track listing. "Down On the Corner" was also released as a single, promoted by an appearance on The Late Late Show with Craig Kilborn in February 2003. "Bangin' On" was released as a single in 2003 and got to #78 in UK. Its B-sides were non-album tracks "Here It Comes" and "Get Me Wrong". Videos were made for "The Last Ride" and "Down On the Corner".

The remastered version of the album was released on 20 September 2024 via BMGon double-CD and double LP the first time. This version featured the remastered of the original album, with the additional of seven unreleased songs, and also additional artwork, which featured the session musicians such as Adam Gray (guitar), Liz Bonney (percussion), and Lee Spencer (synthesizer) as a part of the band, instead of trio-only on the original artwork.

== Promotion ==
Tracks "Bangin' On" and "The Last Ride" comprised the primary soundtrack for the runway show of American fashion designer Michael Kors for his Fall-Winter 2003-04 collection. Track "Caught Up" was featured during the show's finale. The collection, Kors's first outing under Sportswear Holdings Limited, was shown on 12 February 2003 during New York fashion week and met critical acclaim by the fashion press.

== Critical reception ==
Boomslang was met with "mixed or average" reviews from critics. At Metacritic, which assigns a weighted average rating out of 100 to reviews from mainstream publications, this release received an average score of 53 based on 15 reviews.

Uncut gave the album two stars out of five, writing, "Though 'historic' in being the first album of his career as a singing frontman, for those who have bothered to follow Marr's career, Boomslang isn't so extreme a manoeuvre." The review highlighted "the serene 'Something to Shout About' and the cascading 'Down On the Corner': respectively, the No 1 smash Electronic should have had and the massive hit a reformed Smiths still could."

In Rolling Stone, Pat Blashill wrote that the album "shimmers with elements of T. Rex and traces of the Stone Roses – it's got all the atmosphere of a great rock record, but not the guts of one". In The Guardian, Alexis Petridis compared the album negatively to Marr's earlier work in the Smiths. Petridis said that the vocals were in tune but they were "devoid of character". The album's lyrics were said to be "from the Gallagher School of Meaningless Twaddle". The review conceded that the album had its moments but was overall "an opportunity missed ... not bad exactly, but nothing to suggest that history should be rewritten".

== Track listing ==
All tracks are written by Johnny Marr, unless noted.

Boomslang track listing
No.	Title	Writer(s)	Length
1.	"The Last Ride"		4:28
2.	"Caught Up"		4:27
3.	"Down On the Corner"		4:25
4.	"Need It"		5:47
5.	"You Are the Magic"		7:09
6.	"InBetweens"	Zak Starkey, Alonza Bevan, Adam Gray, Marr	3:39
7.	"Another Day"		4:58
8.	"Headland"		1:34
9.	"Long Gone"		4:39
10.	"Something to Shout About"		4:22
11.	"Bangin' On"		5:06

Boomslang 2024 remastered bonus tracks
No.	Title	Writer(s)	Length
1.	"The Way It Was"		5:29
2.	"All Out Attack"		4:42
3.	"Get Me Wrong"		5:24
4.	"Don't Think Twice, It's Alright (Bob Dylan cover)"	Dylan	4:27
5.	"A Woman Like You (Bert Jansch cover)"	Jansch	5:08
6.	"You Are the Magic (Union Mix)"		8:49
7.	"Get Me Wrong (Instrumental)"		5:20

== Personnel ==
Johnny Marr + The Healers

- Johnny Marr – vocals, guitar; synthesizer (tracks 1, 10, 11); organ (track 6); melodica (track 10); producer
- Alonza Bevan – bass guitar; electric piano, recorder, backing vocals (track 7)
- Zak Starkey – drums; percussion (tracks 2, 3, 6, 7, 9, 11)

Additional personnel

- Lee Spencer – synthesizer (tracks 1, 4, 5, 11), effects (track 11)
- Liz Bonney – percussion (tracks 4, 5, 11)
- Jonni Musgrave – piano (track 3)
- Dave Tolan – percussion (track 7)
- Damien Foster, Denise Johnson – backing vocals (track 5)
- Steve Gerdes – art direction
- Fiona Skinner – design
- James Spencer – engineering, mixing
- Frank Arkwright – mastering at The Town House
- Tom Sheehan – photograph

== Charts ==
Chart performance for Boomslang
Chart	Peak position
US Heatseekers Albums (Billboard)	9
