= Straw (band) =

English indie rock band

- Origin: Bristol, England
- Genres: Indie rock, post-Britpop
- Years active: 1998–2000
- Labels: WEA, Columbia
- Past members: Mattie Bennett; Duck Blackwell; Andy Nixon; Dan McKinna; Roger Power

Straw was an English post-Britpop band that released one album, Shoplifting, in 1999.

== History ==
Straw was formed in Bristol by Mattie Bennett (vocals/guitar) and Roger Power (bass/guitar), formerly of The Blue Aeroplanes. Later adding keyboardist Mark "Duck" Blackwell, the group signed to Arista Records under the moniker "Please" with a different lead vocalist. They recorded an album in Boston with American record producers Sean Slade and Paul Q. Kolderie. Unhappy with the results, however, the band was dropped by the label after releasing a single, "If I Was God..." (1995, Sugar Records).

When Arista kept Please's singer under contract, Bennett stepped into the lead vocalist role, the band adding drummer Andy Nixon and re-christening themselves Straw. This newly revitalised line-up was quickly signed to WEA and issued its debut single "Weird Superman" in the summer of 1998. Two more singles and one EP were released: "The Aeroplane Song," (charting at no. 37 in the UK Singles Chart on 6 February 1999), "Moving to California" (charting at no. 50 on 24 April 1999), and Soundtrack of the Summer (including "The World Is Not Enough" – a James Bond theme attempt) in 1999 before Straw released their first full-length effort, Shoplifting.

Throughout 1998 and 1999 the band toured extensively with Puressence, Space and Feeder alongside emerging future stars Muse and gigs with Supergrass, Alanis Morissette, Fountains of Wayne and Reef. The extensive touring and television appearances (including the O-Zone and TFI Friday) took their toll, and differences broke out in the band resulting in the dismissal of Power after the band's final appearance of 1999 at the Glastonbury Festival. They were also subsequently dropped by WEA. They recruited new bassist Dan McKinna, and self-funded (and self-produced) the recording of several new tracks in the basement studio of Pete Thomas' house. On the strength of this new material they were signed to Columbia in 2000 and released the 4-track EP Home Work and the single "Sailing Off the Edge of the World" to critical acclaim. A second album, Keepsakes, was slated for release later that year but they were dropped by Columbia and went their separate ways shortly afterwards.

Andy Nixon and Dan McKinna went on to play in The Jeevas with Crispian Mills of Kula Shaker and then onto The Magic Bullet Band. McKinna has been a session player for many bands including James Morrison, Ben's Brother, Stuart Staples (Tindersticks), A Man Called Adam and Farrah. Blackwell, after producing Straw, The Jeevas and The Magic Bullet Band, continues to work as a record producer and songwriter. Bennett is currently an English teacher at Bodmin College in Cornwall.

== Discography ==
=== Singles ===
- "Weird Superman" (CD & 7" vinyl) (1998)
- "The Aeroplane Song" (CD, 7" vinyl & cassette) (1999)
- "Soundtrack of the Summer" (CD, 7" vinyl) (1999)
- "Moving to California" (2CDs, 7" & 10" vinyl) (1999)
- "Sailing Off the Edge of the World" (CD, 7" vinyl & cassette) (2001)

=== Albums and EPs ===
- 4 Songs by Straw (CD) (1998)
- Shoplifting (CD, 12" vinyl & cassette) (1999)
- Soundtrack of the Summer EP (CD) (1999)
- Homework E.P. (CD & double 7" vinyl) (2000)
- Keepsakes (CD sampler only) (2001)

Although Keepsakes was never released, bar a 5-track sampler, the band could often be found giving away complete copies of the finished album on CD-R at gigs shortly before they split up.

Track listing is as follows:

1. "Tomorrow is Promised To No One"
2. "Sailing Off the Edge of the World"
3. "No Encores"
4. "Watching You Sleep"
5. "Be Careful"
6. "Temporary"
7. "Flowers on a Lampost"
8. "Pop Music is not Complicated"
9. "I Saw Her First"
10. "This is the Future"
11. "In & Out"
12. "Negative of Love"
13. "Dracula (I Will Survive)"
