= Thirteen:13 =

British alternative rock band

Background information
- Origin: England
- Genres: Alternative rock
- Years active: 1999–2001
- Label: Polydor
- Past members: Wayne Murray; Toby MacFarlaine; Ben Etchells; Martin Carling; Paul Winterhart

Thirteen:13 were a British alternative rock band, formed in 1999 by members of Catch.

Quickly signed to Polydor, the band's original line-up consisted of songwriters Wayne Murray (vocals and guitar) and Toby MacFarlaine (bass and vocals) with Ben Etchells (lead guitar) and Martin Carling (drums). Carling was later replaced by Kula Shaker drummer Paul Winterhart.

The band were voted one of Melody Maker's top ten new bands to watch out for in 2000 and toured with JJ72, Gay Dad, Powderfinger and My Vitriol amongst others during their time together. They also played several festivals including the 2001 Carling Festival at Leeds and Reading.

Polydor released four singles between October 2000 and October 2001 but none of these broke the Top 40 in the UK Singles Chart, and the band were dropped just before Christmas 2001, prompting the group to disband. All hopes were resting on "Try" breaking into the top 40 after the band appeared on various TV shows promoting the single, and receiving play listings on Virgin Radio, BBC Radio 2 and MTV2. However the single only charted at No. 92, leading to their album being shelved for a longer period of time before being dropped.

Thirteen:13's debut album, Deny Everything, had been fully recorded by the time the band split but was never released. Much of the band's recorded work, including Deny Everything, had been made available at now defunct fan site with the blessing of Wayne Murray.

Following the split, Wayne Murray formed The Honeymoon (initially called The Lovers) with Icelandic singer Thorunn Magnúsdóttir and released the album Dialogue on 19 July 2004 on the RCA label. Wayne is currently working under the name 'Boy Cried Wolf', but has recently been taking time out from the band to play guitar on tour with James Dean Bradfield of Manic Street Preachers and has appeared live as a second guitarist with the Manics themselves.

Toby MacFarlaine is currently playing with new band Reunion Square as well as being part of Graham Coxon's and Charlotte Hatherley's respective touring bands. He formed a new band with the remaining members of The Darkness called Stone Gods. They released their debut album Silver Spoons & Broken Bones in 2008; it reached No. 67 in the UK Albums Chart.

Guitarist Ben Etchells joined new wave glam rockers The Candys before forming Ben & The Pimps while Paul Winter-Hart left to play drums with Shep and is now back in the reformed Kula Shaker.

Both MacFarlaine and Murray, the band's chief songwriters, have re-recorded Thirteen:13 songs with their new bands.

== Discography ==
Singles

- "Perfect Imperfection" (2 October 2000)
- "50 Stories" (5 March 2001) UK No. 81
- "Truth Hurts" (11 June 2001) UK No. 77
- "Try" (22 October 2001) UK No. 92

Album

- 'Deny Everything' (2001, unreleased)
1. "Hoax"
2. "50 Stories"
3. "Never Want To See You This Way"
4. "Perfect Imperfection"
5. "Truth Hurts"
6. "I Need An Army To Protect Me"
7. "Try"
8. "Birthday Cards"
9. "Dirty Words" (interlude after this track is the last few seconds of b-side "Typo" from "Truth Hurts")
10. "Not Forever"
11. "A Little Less"
12. "Act Like You Know Her"
13. "Jason Says"
