= Shoplifting (album) =

Studio album by Straw
- Released: (United Kingdom) 16 November 1999
- Genre: Indie rock, post-Britpop
- Length: 55:36
- Label: WEA
- Producer: Mattie Bennett, Duck, Stephen Harris

Straw chronology
Shoplifting (1999)	Home Work (2000)

Professional ratings
Review scores
Source	Rating
AllMusic	4.5/5 stars

Shoplifting is the debut studio album by the Bristol-based indie rock group Straw.

== Track listing ==
No.	Title	Length
1.	"Dracula Has Risen From The Grave"	3:42
2.	"Weird Superman"	4:10
3.	"The Aeroplane Song"	4:05
4.	"Moving To California"	6:04
5.	"Shoplifting"	3:54
6.	"Kill Your Boyfriend"	3:56
7.	"Anthem For The Low In Self-Esteem"	3:29
8.	"United States Of Amnesia"	4:02
9.	"Postcards From Hell"	4:28
10.	"Soundtrack Of The Summer"	4:42
11.	"Wake Up (Miss Venezuela)"	4:02
12.	"We Don't Belong"	5:04
13.	"Galveston"	4:05
Total length:		55:36

== Personnel ==
Straw

- Mattie Bennett - Vocals/Guitar
- Roger Power - Bass
- Mark "Duck" Blackwell - Keyboard
- Andy Nixon - Drums
