= The Jeevas =

English rock band

- Origin: England
- Genres: Psychedelic rock
- Years active: 2002–2005
- Members: Crispian Mills; Andy Nixon; Dan McKinna

The Jeevas were an English rock supergroup. Its members were Crispian Mills (vocals, guitar), Andy Nixon (drums), and Dan McKinna (bass). Mills was previously the vocalist of Kula Shaker. Nixon and McKinna were previous members of Straw and a third member of Straw, Mark "Duck" Blackwell, produced both The Jeevas' albums. Mills rejoined Kula Shaker in late 2005, and The Jeevas disbanded.

Nixon and McKinna formed The Magic Bullet Band, and they toured in support of the Kula Shaker reunion tour in early 2006, but did not release any material.

== Discography ==
=== 2002: 1,2,3,4 ===
1-2-3-4!

Studio album by The Jeevas
- Released: 9 September 2002
- Genre: rock
- Length: 35:27
- Label: Cowboy UK
- Producer: Crispian Mills

==== Track listing (UK version) ====
1. "Virginia" (C.Mills) – 3:31
2. "Ghost (Cowboys in the Movies)" (C. Mills, S. Roberts, J. Winter-Hart) – 3:00
3. "You Got My Number" (J. O'Neill) – 3:02
4. "What Is It For?" (C. Mills) – 4:00
5. "Once Upon a Time in America" (C. Mills) – 3:24
6. "Don't Say The Good Times Are Over" (C. Mills) – 3:08
7. "Scary Parents" (C. Mills) – 3:24
8. "Teenage Breakdown" (C. Mills) – 4:01
9. "Silver Apples" (C. Mills, M. Pritchard) – 3:04
10. "Edge of the World" (C. Mills) – 4:53

==== Track listing (Japanese version) ====
1. "Virginia" (C.Mills) – 3:30
2. "Ghost (Cowboys in the Movies)" (C. Mills, S. Roberts, J. Winter-Hart) – 2:58
3. "You Got My Number" (J. O'Neill) – 3:00
4. "What Is It For?" (C. Mills) – 3:59
5. "Once Upon a Time in America" (C. Mills) – 3:23
6. "Don't Say The Good Times Are Over" (C. Mills) – 3:08
7. "Scary Parents" (C. Mills) – 3:23
8. "Teenage Breakdown" (C. Mills) – 4:01
9. "Silver Apples" (C. Mills, M. Pritchard) – 2:53
10. "She Speaks" (C. Mills) – 4:16 Bonus Track
11. "Edge of the World" (C. Mills) – 4:50
12. "America" (C. Mills) – 2:37 Demo Bonus Track

=== 2003: Cowboys and Indians ===
Cowboys and Indians

Studio album by The Jeevas
- Released: 6 October 2003
- Recorded: at Napolen Road Studios.
- Genre: Rock
- Length: 46:07
- Label: Cowboy UK
- Producer: Duck Blackwell and Crispian Mills

==== Track listing ====
All songs by Crispian Mills, unless otherwise noted.

1. "Black & Blue" – 2:43
2. "Have You Ever Seen the Rain?" (John Fogerty) – 3:23
3. "Healing Hands" – 3:40
4. "The Way You Carry On" – 3:39
5. "I Can't Help Myself" – 3:17
6. "Back Home" – 3:13
7. "Que Pasa (con tu culo)?" – 2:33
8. "How Much Do You Suck?" – 2:33
9. "Masters of War" (Bob Dylan) – 6:05
10. "Stoned Love" – 4:50
11. "Girl Without a Name" – 3:07
12. "Good Man Down" – 4:39
13. "Rio Grande" – 15:18

Japanese Bonus Tracks:

1. "Stop" – 3:41
2. "How Much Do You Suck?" (Hank Williams version) – 3:10

=== Singles ===
- "Scary Parents" (2002)
- "One Louder" (2002) – Japan only
- "Virginia" (2002) – UK #97
- "Ghost (Cowboys in the Movies)" (2002)
- "Once Upon a Time in America" (2003) – UK #61
- "The Way You Carry On" (2003) – UK #78
- "Have You Ever Seen the Rain?" (2004) – UK #70
