= Grateful When You're Dead =

"Grateful When You're Dead / Jerry Was There"

Single by Kula Shaker

from the album K
- Released: 22 April 1996
- Recorded: 1996
- Genre: Alternative rock; psychedelic rock
- Length: 5:42
- Label: Columbia Records
- Songwriter(s): Crispian Mills
- Producer(s): John Leckie, Shep & Dodge, Crispian Mills

"Grateful When You're Dead / Jerry Was There" is a song by the English rock band Kula Shaker, taken from their first album K.

The song's title is a reference to the American rock band Grateful Dead and their lead guitarist Jerry Garcia. The song is in two parts: the GWYD part, which is a standard rock song, and the JWT part, which is more drifting with dark and ethnic sounds.

The single was released on 22 April 1996, both as a 7" and a CD, and reached number 35 on the UK singles chart.

In Melody Maker, critic Neil Kulkarni declared "Grateful When You're Dead" and previous release "Tattva" to be "the two worst singles of '96".

== Track listing in both formats ==
1. "Grateful When You're Dead/Jerry Was There"
2. "Another Life"
3. "Under the Hammer"
- Catalogue number CD: KulaCD2
- Catalogue number 7": Kula 72
