= Tattva (song) =

1996 single by Kula Shaker

- KULA CD3. The black oblong at the bottom right is a sticker.

Single by Kula Shaker

from the album K
- B-side: "Tattva on St George's Day"; "Dance in Your Shadow"; "Moonshine"; "Red Balloon (Vishnu's Eyes)"
- Released: 24 June 1996
- Recorded: January–May 1996
- Studio: Various
- Genre: Psychedelic rock; Britpop
- Length: 3:46
- Label: Columbia
- Songwriters: Crispian Mills; Kula Shaker
- Producer: John Leckie

Kula Shaker singles chronology
"Tattva" (1996)	"Grateful When You're Dead" / "Jerry Was There" (1996)
"Grateful When You're Dead" / "Jerry Was There" (1996)	"Tattva" (1996)	"Hey Dude" (1996)

"Tattva" is a song by British psychedelic rock band Kula Shaker, released as the band's debut single. It was first released in the United Kingdom in 1996 as "Tattva (Lucky 13 Mix)", then re-issued on 24 June 1996 as a re-recording from their debut album, K (1996), with a different sleeve and track listing. The re-recording reached number four on the UK Singles Chart, number 11 on the Canadian RPM Alternative 30 chart, and number 10 on the US Billboard Modern Rock Tracks chart. In Melody Maker, critic Neil Kulkarni declared "Tattva" and follow-up release "Grateful When You're Dead" to be "the two worst singles of '96".

== Meaning ==
The chorus of the song is: Tattva, acintya bheda abheda Tattva. In Hindu philosophy tattva is a Sanskrit word meaning 'thatness', 'principle', 'essence', 'reality' or 'truth'. Likewise, acintya can mean 'the inconceivable', 'the unthinkable', or 'he who cannot be imagined', bheda translates as 'difference', and abheda translates as 'non-difference'. For this song, acintya might best be thought of in terms of apophatic theology, also known as 'divine darkness', a Christian notion (which has clear parallels in all world religions) whereby God is so far beyond our conceptions that we can only speak of what God is not. Not that the word acintya would necessarily correspond to the Western idea of God, but the same kind of ineffable mystery is implied here. As such, one possible translation of the chorus would be: "Truth, Mystery, difference non-difference Truth."

== Releases ==
The "Lucky 13 Mix" was issued on 7-inch vinyl and CD in the United Kingdom, with both formats including "Hollow Man (Part II)" as the B-side. The 7-inch edition was limited to 1000 copies. This version of the single reached number 86 on the UK Singles Chart. The second edition was released on the same formats but with an additional CD. The 7-inch comprised "Tattva" plus a different mix titled "Tattva on St. George's Day" as well as the principle B-side "Dance in Your Shadow". The first CD includes "Moonshine" and the "Lucky 13 Mix" as its exclusive tracks, and the second disc contains "Red Balloon (Vishnu's Eyes)". An Australian maxi-CD single was released in 1996 that contains most of the tracks from these latter releases.

Both CDs (KULA CD3 and KULA CD3K) were housed in card picture sleeves. The second CD has a printed spine and also contained an inner sleeve, much like a vinyl LP. The first edition of "Tattva" came in a standard slimline jewel case.

== Music video ==
Two music videos for "Tattva" were produced: one for Europe and a second made for the United States.

== Track listings ==
UK 7-inch and CD single

A. "Tattva" (Lucky 13 mix)
B. "Hollow Man (Part II)"

UK 7-inch single

A1. "Tattva"
B1. "Tattva on St George's Day"
B2. "Dance in Your Shadow"

UK CD1

1. "Tattva"
2. "Dance in Your Shadow"
3. "Moonshine"
4. "Tattva" (Lucky 13 Mix)

UK CD2

1. "Tattva on St. George's Day"
2. "Dance in Your Shadow"
3. "Red Balloon (Vishnu's Eyes)"

European CD single

1. "Tattva"
2. "Dance in Your Shadow"

Australian CD and cassette single

1. "Tattva" (Leckie radio edit)
2. "Tattva (On St George's Day)"
3. "Dance in Your Shadow"
4. "Moonshine"
5. "Tattva" (Lucky 13 Mix)

== Credits and personnel ==
Credits are taken from the UK CD1 liner notes and the K album booklet.

Studios

- Recorded between January and May 1996 at various studios

Personnel

- Kula Shaker – writing
  - Crispian Mills – writing, vocals, acoustic guitars, electric guitars, tambura
  - Alonza Bevan – backing vocals, bass, piano, tabla
  - Jay Darlington – organ, Mellotron, piano
  - Paul Winterhart – drums
- John Leckie – production, mixing, engineering
- Stylorouge – artwork design

== Charts ==
=== Weekly charts ===
Chart (1996–1997)	Peak position
Canada Rock/Alternative (RPM)	11
Europe (Eurochart Hot 100)	26
Germany (GfK)	85
Scottish Singles Sales (Official Charts)	3
UK Singles (Official Charts)	4
US Hot 100 Airplay (Billboard)	63
US Modern Rock Tracks (Billboard)	10

=== Year-end charts ===
Chart (1997)	Position
US Modern Rock Tracks (Billboard)	76
