= K (album) =

Studio album by Kula Shaker
- Released: 16 September 1996
- Studios: Eden, RAK, Townhouse, Chipping Norton, Livingston, The Pierce Room, Wessex, Maison Rouge, Eastcote Studios
- Genres: Psychedelic rock, raga rock, Britpop
- Length: 48:51 (not including 13:04 silence)
- Label: Columbia
- Producers: John Leckie, Shep & Dodge, Crispian Mills

Kula Shaker chronology
K (1996)	Peasants, Pigs & Astronauts (1999)

Singles from K
- 1. "Grateful When You're Dead" Released: 22 April 1996; 2. "Tattva" Released: 24 June 1996; 3. "Hey Dude" Released: 26 August 1996; 4. "Govinda" Released: 11 November 1996

K is the debut album by English psychedelic rock band Kula Shaker, released on 16 September 1996. It became the fastest selling debut album in Britain since Elastica's debut the previous year, selling 105,768 copies in the first week. The album reached the number-one position on the UK Albums Chart and number 200 on the US Billboard 200. It was voted number 879 in the third edition of Colin Larkin's All Time Top 1000 Albums (2000).

The Grateful Dead's psychedelic rock style is an influence on Kula Shaker's first and second albums. The hidden track after "Hollow Man" is a recording of A. C. Bhaktivedanta Swami Prabhupada, the founder of the International Society for Krishna Consciousness, speaking about his own guru.

== Artwork ==
The cover art (by comic-book artist Dave Gibbons) consists of various images related to the letter K, including: John F. Kennedy, Lord Kitchener, Karl Marx, Gene Kelly, Katharine Hepburn, Ken Dodd, Kareem Abdul-Jabbar, Danny Kaye, Kal-El (Superman), Boris Karloff (as Frankenstein's monster), Krishna, King Kong, Martin Luther King Jr., two Knights (a pair of Keys on one of them), a Kettle, Kali, the Kaiser, Nikita Khrushchev, Grace Kelly, the number 11 (symbolizing K), and Rudyard Kipling's book Kim.

== Critical reception ==
Professional ratings
Review scores
Source	Rating
AllMusic	3/5 stars
Alternative Press	5/5
Chicago Tribune	2/4 stars
Entertainment Weekly	B+
The Guardian	3/5 stars
NME	9/10
Q	4/5 stars
Record Collector	3/5 stars
USA Today	3.5/4 stars
The Village Voice	C

The Independent noted that "Kula Shaker do what they do with so much gall, energy, conviction and dexterity (special honours go to the speedy bass-playing) that you forget to nitpick and imagine you're really hearing a lost masterpiece from 1971."

== Track listing ==
All tracks are written by Crispian Mills except where indicated.

Original track listing
No.	Title	Writer(s)	Length
1.	"Hey Dude"		4:10
2.	"Knight on the Town"		3:25
3.	"Temple of Everlasting Light"	Mills; Alonza Bevan	2:33
4.	"Govinda"		4:57
5.	"Smart Dogs"		3:16
6.	"Magic Theatre"	Mills; Bevan	2:38
7.	"Into the Deep"	Mills; Bevan	3:49
8.	"Sleeping Jiva"	Mills; Bevan; Jay Darlington; Paul Winterhart	2:02
9.	"Tattva"		3:46
10.	"Grateful When You're Dead/Jerry Was There"		5:42
11.	"303"	Mills; Bevan	3:08
12.	"Start All Over"		2:35
13.	"Hollow Man (Parts 1 & 2)" (plus 0:12 hidden track after – 13:04 silence)		6:10

15th anniversary edition bonus tracks
No.	Title	Writer(s)	Length
14.	"Tattva" (Lucky 13 Mix)	Mills; Bevan; Darlington; Winterhart	3:59
15.	"Into the Deep" (unreleased John Leckie version)	Mills; Bevan	4:45
16.	"Red Balloon (Vishnu's Eyes)"	Tim Hardin	3:42
17.	"Hush" ("Hush" is 2:58; plus 1:25 hidden track at the end, an extended version of the original hidden track)	Joe South	17:20

15th anniversary Japanese edition bonus tracks
No.	Title	Writer(s)	Length
14.	"Raagy One (Waiting for Tomorrow)"		4:27
15.	"Tattva" (Lucky 13 Mix)	Mills; Bevan; Darlington; Winterhart	3:59
16.	"Into the Deep" (unreleased John Leckie version)	Mills; Bevan	4:45
17.	"Red Balloon (Vishnu's Eyes)"	Hardin	3:42
18.	"Hush" ("Hush" is 2:58; plus 1:25 hidden track at the end, an extended version of the original hidden track)	Joe South	12:53

== Personnel ==
Kula Shaker

- Crispian Mills – singing, electric and acoustic guitars, tamboura
- Alonza Bevan – bass, piano, tabla, backing vocals
- Paul Winterhart – drums
- Jay Darlington – organ, Mellotron, piano

Guest musicians

- Wajahat Kahn – sarod (on "Sleeping Jiva")
- Himangsu Goswami – tabla (on "Govinda" and "Jerry Was There")
- Gouri Choudhury – backing vocals (on "Govinda", credited as "Gouri")
- The Kick Horns – horns (on "Start All Over")

== Charts ==
=== Weekly charts ===
Weekly chart performance for K
Chart (1996–1997)	Peak position
Australian Albums (ARIA)	35
Belgian Albums (Ultratop Flanders)	47
Dutch Albums (Album Top 100)	22
Finnish Albums (Suomen virallinen lista)	22
German Albums (Offizielle Top 100)	67
New Zealand Albums (RMNZ)	23
Norwegian Albums (VG-lista)	19
Scottish Albums (Official Charts)	1
Swedish Albums (Sverigetopplistan)	20
UK Albums (Official Charts)	1
US Billboard 200	200

=== Year-end charts ===
Year-end chart performance for K
Chart (1996)	Position
UK Albums (OCC)	16
Chart (1997)	Position
UK Albums (OCC)	38

== Certifications ==
Certifications for K
Region	Certification	Certified units/sales
United Kingdom (BPI)	3× Platinum	900,000^{‡}
^{^} Shipments figures based on certification alone.
