= Jay Darlington =

British keyboardist

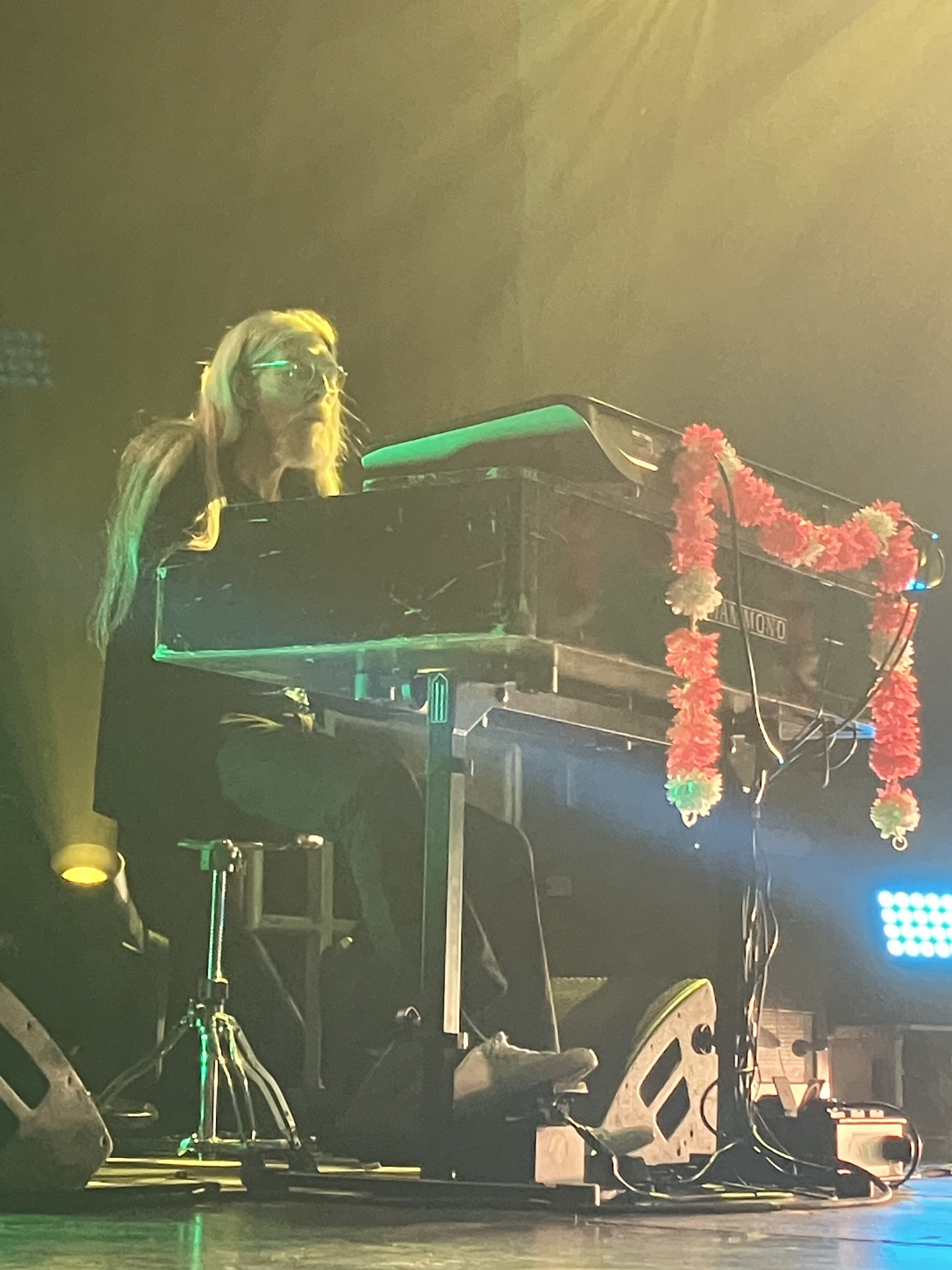
- Darlington performing with Kula Shaker in 2024

Background information
- Also known as: The Shroud, Gandalf, Jesus
- Born: Jay Peter Darlington; 3 May 1968 (age 58); Sidcup, Greater London, England
- Genres: Indie rock; Britpop; raga rock; alternative rock; neo-psychedelia; progressive rock
- Occupation: Musician
- Instruments: Keyboards; Hammond organ; mellotron; piano; electronics
- Years active: 1994–present
- Member of: Kula Shaker
- Formerly of: Oasis

Jay Peter Darlington (born 3 May 1968) is an English keyboardist, best known as a member of psychedelic rock band Kula Shaker. He went on to work as a touring member of the rock band Oasis from 2002 to 2009 before re-joining Kula Shaker in late 2022 as a full-time member during the recording of their seventh album, Natural Magick.

== History ==
Darlington attended Oxted County Senior School in Oxted, Surrey, England. He joined Kula Shaker as an organ player in 1994 and stayed with the band until their initial split in 1999. He didn't re-join the band when they reformed in 2004, and was replaced by Harry Broadbent during his absence.

In 2002, Darlington joined Oasis as a touring member. He toured with the band up until their last tour in the summer of 2009. He also played in a Les Fleur de Lys reunion gig, and joined prog band Magic Bus.

In December 2022 he rejoined Kula Shaker.

== Discography ==
=== Kula Shaker ===
- K (1996)
- Summer Sun EP (1997)
- Peasants, Pigs and Astronauts (1999)
- Natural Magick (2024)

=== Oasis ===
- iTunes Live: London Festival (2009)
- Dig Out Your Soul (2008) - on the track "Falling Down"

=== Magic Bus ===
- Magic Bus (2010)
- Transmission from Sogmore's Garden (2014)
- Phillip The Egg (2017)
- The Earth Years (2020)
