= Kula Shaker =

English psychedelic rock band

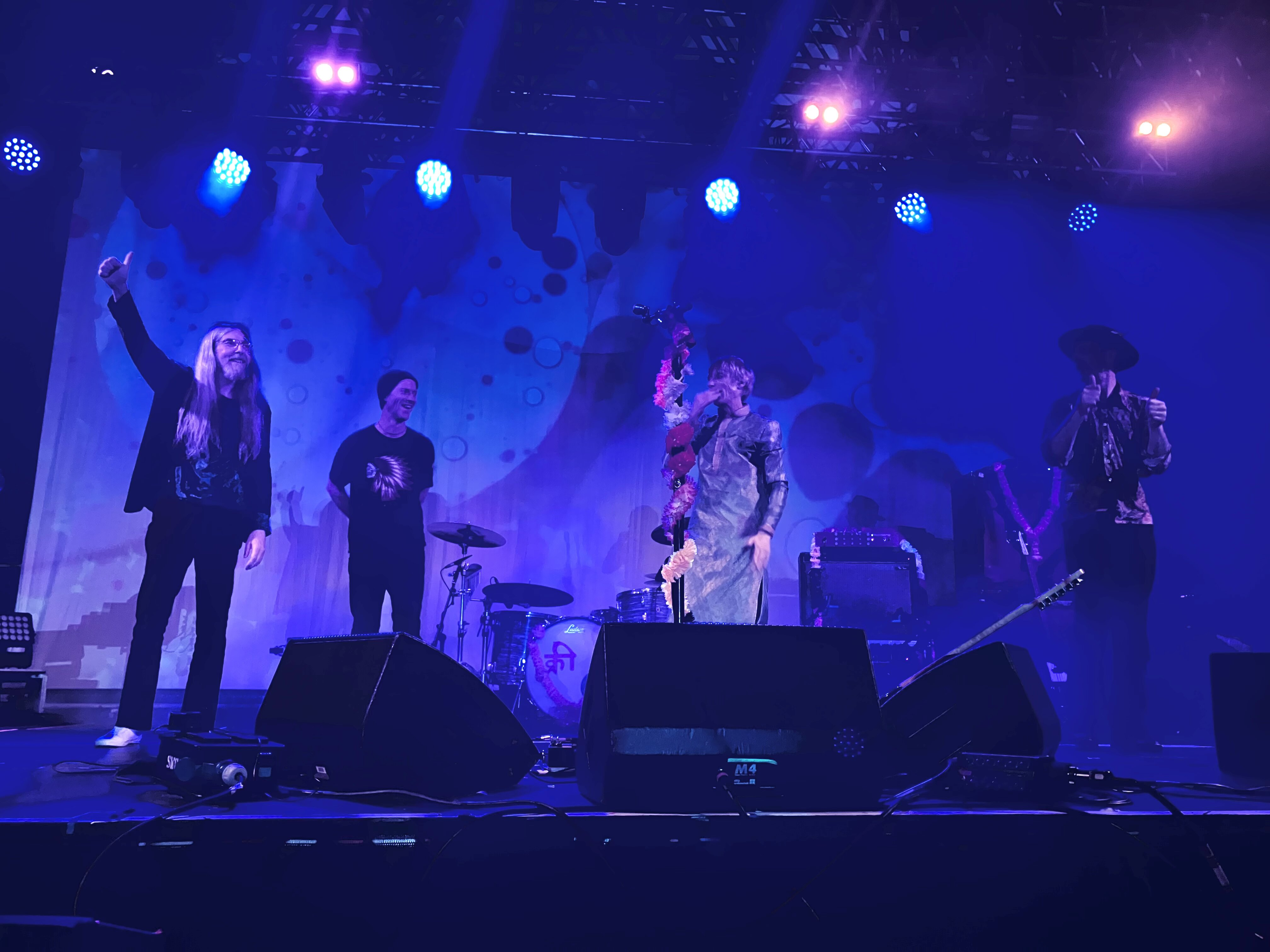
- Kula Shaker's founding members in 2024; Left to right: Jay Darlington, Paul Winterhart, Crispian Mills, Alonza Bevan

Background information
- Also known as: The Kays (1993–1995)
- Origin: London, England
- Genres: Britpop; raga rock; neo-psychedelia
- Years active: 1993–1999, 2004–present
- Labels: Columbia; Sony BMG; Cooking Vinyl; Strange F.O.L.K.
- Members: Crispian Mills; Alonza Bevan; Paul Winterhart; Jay Darlington
- Past members: Harry Broadbent; Saul Dismont
- Website: kulashaker.co.uk

Kula Shaker are an English psychedelic rock band. Led by frontman Crispian Mills, the band came to prominence during the Britpop era of the 1990s. The band enjoyed commercial success in the UK between 1996 and 1999, notching up a number of top 10 hits on the UK Singles Chart, including "Tattva", "Hey Dude", "Govinda", "Hush" and "Sound of Drums". The band's debut album, K, reached No. 1 on the UK Albums Chart. It was voted number 879 in Colin Larkin's All Time Top 1000 Albums 3rd Edition (2000).

The band are known for their interest in traditional Indian music, culture and mysticism, with a number of their most famous songs, including "Tattva" and "Govinda", featuring lyrics written in Sanskrit. The name Kula Shaker was itself inspired by Kulasekhara, an Indian king from the 9th century. In addition, many of the band's songs feature traditional Indian instruments, such as the sitar, tamboura and tabla, juxtaposed with guitar-heavy, Western rock instrumentation. Despite achieving commercial success, Kula Shaker were unpopular with some critics.

Kula Shaker disbanded in September 1999 but reformed in 2004 for sessions for the School of Braja compilation album. This led to plans for a full comeback, although the reformation was not widely publicised until the beginning of 2006. The band's third album, Strangefolk, was issued in 2007 and their fourth, Pilgrims Progress, was released in 2010. The band returned with a mostly sold-out European tour and new album K 2.0 in 2016 which was well received both by the media and the fans.

After taking an extended hiatus, the band released their sixth album, 1st Congregational Church of Eternal Love and Free Hugs in June 2022, their seventh album, Natural Magick, in 2024 and their eighth, Wormslayer, in January 2026.

== Band history ==
=== Formation (1988–1995) ===
"I was a guitar worshipper, I started off not wanting to be a singer, but wanting to be Ritchie Blackmore or Jimmy Page. The big profound influence of Kula Shaker is really [the] 1968-1972 period where bands became loud and heavy but still had quite a songwriting influence. Santana, Fleetwood Mac, Deep Purple, Led Zeppelin, The Who, bands with Hammond organs and guitars."

— Crispian Mills, describing influences in a 2024 interview

The origin of Kula Shaker can be traced back to 1988 when Crispian Mills (son of actress Hayley Mills and film director Roy Boulting) met Alonza Bevan at Richmond upon Thames College in South-West London. The two went on to play together in a band named Objects of Desire, formed later that year. The band's initial line-up consisted of Mills on lead guitar, Bevan on bass, Richard Cave on drums (until 1990) later Marcus French (aka Frog) on drums, Leigh Morris on rhythm guitar and Marcus Maclaine (then Hayley Mills' boyfriend) on lead vocals. In 1991, Paul Winterhart joined the band, replacing French on drums. During this period, Crispian and Alonza were also responsible for running the Mantra Shack, a psychedelic nightclub at the back of Richmond ice rink, and consequently, the Objects of Desire would often perform at the venue.

The Objects of Desire disbanded acrimoniously in March 1993, after which, Mills went on a spiritual pilgrimage, backpacking around India. Upon returning to the UK he formed a new band named the Kays, with Bevan, Winterhart and Mills' cousin Saul Dismont on vocals. The band's debut live performance was at the 1993 Glastonbury Festival. Within a year, Dismont had left the band, only to be replaced by organist Jay Darlington, who had previously been a member of several mod revival bands. After two years of touring and recording, the Kays elected to change their name and musical direction.

In May 1995, Mills suggested that the band take the name Kula Shaker, in honour of one of the twelve Alvars (saints of south India), the ninth-century Indian emperor and holy man, King Kulashekhara. In Indian culture, the name Kulashekhara is thought to be lucky or auspicious, and this appealed to the struggling band. Mills also posited that Kula Shaker's music should follow a more spiritual and mystical direction in future, in line with his own growing interest in the philosophy of Gaudiya Vaishnavism. This new emphasis on Indian mysticism and instrumentation, dovetailed with the Beatlesque, 1960s-derived influences already present in the band's music, to create a sound heavily indebted to 1960s psychedelia.

=== Mainstream success (1995–1999) ===
In September 1995, Kula Shaker were joint winners of the In The City contest (along with Placebo), which quickly resulted in a record contract with Columbia Records, who were eager to sign another band that had the multi-platinum, crossover appeal of Oasis. A debut single, "Tattva (Lucky 13 Mix)" (later re-recorded for their debut album) was released on CD and limited 7" vinyl in January 1996, but it entered just outside the UK Top 75, at number 86. "Tattva" was followed quickly in April by the band's second single, "Grateful When You're Dead", a slice of Jimi Hendrix-esque rock which was to become their debut UK Top 40 single (entering at No. 35). Music press and public alike finally began to take notice of the band, and this sudden exposure propelled the re-released (and re-recorded) "Tattva" to No. 4 in the UK Singles Chart. The band's upward climb continued with their third single "Hey Dude", a more traditional rock song which was only kept off the top spot by the Spice Girls when it was released in August.

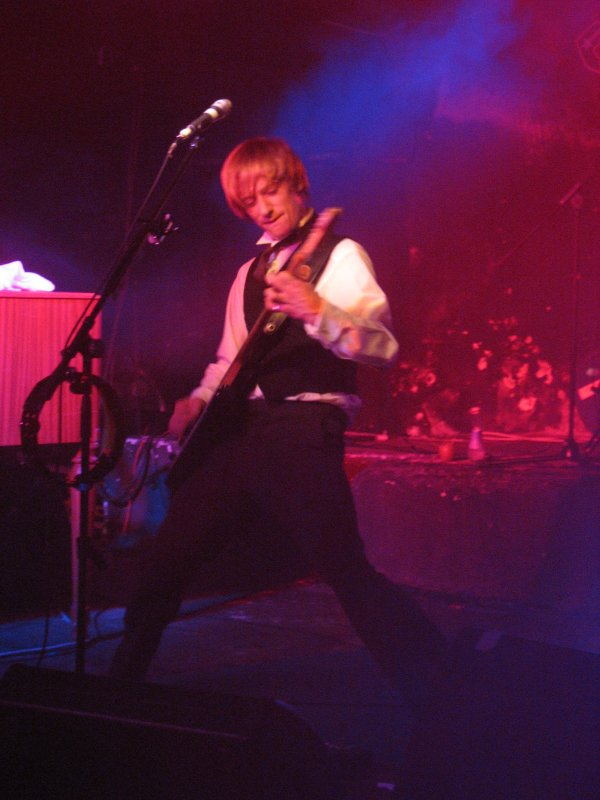
Crispian Mills

September saw the release of the band's debut album K, which became the fastest selling debut album in Britain since Elastica's debut the previous year. It was eventually certified 2× Platinum by the BPI in January 1997. The album went on to sell over 850,000 copies in the UK (double platinum), and a further 250,000 copies in the United States.

The fourth and final single from K was "Govinda", which reached No. 7 in the UK charts in December of that year. "Govinda" was sung totally in Sanskrit, and mixed swirling guitars with traditional Indian music. Total sales for all the singles from K came to half a million.

At the start of 1997, the band received four nominations for BRIT Awards, and they subsequently won the award for "British Breakthrough Act" at the ceremony in February. In the same month they released what would turn out to be their biggest hit, a cover of "Hush" (originally written by Joe South for Billy Joe Royal, and most famously performed by the British hard-rock band Deep Purple), which peaked at number 2. The song also proved successful in the U.S., where it was used on the soundtrack to the blockbuster movie I Know What You Did Last Summer and again in the trailer for the 2014 film Kingsman: The Secret Service. The song was also placed at No. 224 by Virgin Radio, in a poll for the 20th century's greatest songs. In the wake of the single's release, some ill-advised remarks on the traditional mystical properties of Swastikas by Crispian Mills was criticised by the British Press.

Despite the negative publicity, the band pressed on regardless with a set of live shows in the summer of that year, including T in the Park, Glastonbury and the V Festival. The focus during the latter part of 1997 moved to the US where both "Tattva" and "Hey Dude" received airplay exposure. "Tattva" became a minor No. 10 hit in the Modern Rock Tracks chart and "Hey Dude" peaked at No. 25. K itself peaked at No. 11 in the Heatseekers chart and crept to No. 200 in the Billboard charts. An EP, Summer Sun, was released in the U.S. for the band's fans there. The six tracks on the EP were all B-sides to earlier UK singles.

After initial disagreements with management, Kula Shaker resurfaced with the UK-only single "Sound of Drums" in April 1998, peaking at number 3. A promised album in the summer of that year failed to materialise, and the momentum generated by the single was lost as a result. Fans would have to wait until February 1999 to hear any more new material from the forthcoming second album.

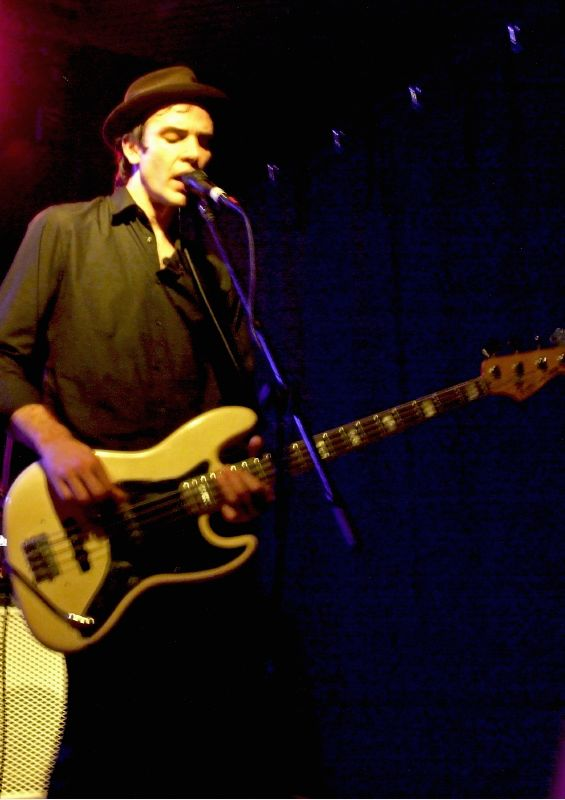
Bassist Alonza Bevan

The second album Peasants, Pigs & Astronauts was partly recorded aboard the houseboat-studio Astoria. Brett Findlay joined the band as resident percussionist and remained with the band until their break-up at the end of 1999. The release of Peasants, Pigs & Astronauts was preceded by the single "Mystical Machine Gun" which failed to make as strong an impact on the charts as their previous singles, peaking at Number 14 and only remaining two weeks in the top 40. The album itself followed in March 1999 to mixed reviews, and only sold a mere 25,000 copies in its first week as it crawled in at Number 9 on the album chart, spending only 10 weeks in the UK Top 75. The album went Gold in the UK (over 100,000 copies sold). The third and final single from the album, "Shower Your Love" failed to reignite momentum, stalling at No. 14, even with it having more TV exposure on Top of the Pops, TFI Friday, Later... with Jools Holland and CD:UK.

=== Comments on the swastika ===
Prior to the release of their second album, the band became the subject of controversy surrounding remarks that Mills had made in the NME and Melody Maker, regarding the swastika, calling it a "brilliant image" albeit in the context of its traditional Indian origins. The Independent on Sunday ran a front-page article in April 1997 reprinting Mills' comments and alleging that the guitarist "had dabbled with Nazism". The negative publicity surrounding the incident, along with overexposure in the British media, hurt the band's sales. The Independent article also revealed that the Objects of Desire had used the motto "England will rise again", and had performed at a 1993 conference at Wembley called "Global Deception" at which speakers included renowned conspiracy theorists Eustace Mullins and William Cooper.

Mills responded to the allegations by fax and his responses were incorporated in the article. Mills admitted having played at "Global Deception", but claimed not to have fully understood the nature of the event. He indicated that he now felt that the swastika, which has origins outside Nazism and different meanings in different parts of the world, was hopelessly connected to Nazism in the West. He indicated that it was the outrage that his comments had sparked that had led him to this conclusion. He also offered an unequivocal condemnation of far-right-wing ideology.

I think there is no better example of my naivete and insensitivity than the swastika comments ... my comments derive from my long interest in Indian culture, from which the swastika has its origins ... I apologise to those who have been offended by my comment and humbly ask that they accept that I am completely against the Nazis, their crimes and any other latter-day form of totalitarianism. For the record I have never been an anti-semite especially as my dear grandmother was Jewish ... I loathe totalitarianism, far right thinking, oppression of all forms, denial of human rights and all things that would limit the free spirit of humankind. I stand for peace, love, generosity and learning.

Looking back in 2016, Mills said "We thought we were smarter than we were ... that was the innocence of our youth ploughing into the adult world."

Kula Shaker disbanded in September 1999.

=== After the split (1999–2004) ===
Mills went into the studio in 2000 to work on a solo album. Later that year, he toured with a group of musicians under the name Pi, first supporting Robbie Williams on his UK Arena dates, then for some smaller headline shows. A new album was scheduled for release in spring 2001 according to Mills' official website and the NME. However, his UK record label did not feel the material proposed for release was commercial enough, and so Mills negotiated an exit from his contract with them in 2001, continuing to record for the rest of 2001 without a UK record deal. He played at the Glastonbury Festival in 2001 with Suns of Arqa. At the start of 2002, he began working with Andy Nixon and Dan Mckinna, formerly of Straw, and the trio formed a group, The Jeevas. Mills ditched all his previously recorded material up to that point, though some tracks would later feature as Jeevas B-Sides. They released two albums, toured throughout 2002 and 2003, with some dates in mid-2004. Their records were released on their own Cowboy Musik label in the UK and mainland Europe, and by Sony in Japan. Some tentative work was done for their third album, but when it became apparent during 2005 that the reformation of Kula Shaker would be permanent, the band officially split up.

Bevan joined Johnny Marr and the Healers in 2000. As a side project, he formed the band Shep (which included Winterhart on drums). The band played a handful of gigs in 2001–2002 and released some excerpts of recorded music via the web but nothing further was heard of them after 2003. Winterhart joined the band Thirteen:13, who split in 2001. He also drummed on an album by Aqualung as well as being part of Shep. Darlington joined Oasis in 2002 as a touring keyboardist (though not an official band member), and remained in that role until the band's split in 2009.

In December 2002, Sony released a best of album, entitled Kollected – The Best of Kula Shaker. Mills compiled the track listing for the release and approved the sleevenotes. The compilation included the band's final recorded track in the pre-break-up-lineup, a cover of Bob Dylan's "Ballad of a Thin Man", which was later featured on the soundtrack to the 2005 movie Stoned, starring Leo Gregory.

=== Pilgrims Progress and other albums (2008–) ===
In 2008 the band was in the studio with a new member, multi-instrumentalist and producer Henry Bowers-Broadbent, working on Pilgrims Progress, but became locked in a legal dispute with their label which resulted in most of the work for the next album being frozen. In May 2009, work on the new album had recommenced. The album was released on 28 June 2010.

On 20 December 2021, the band released Kula Christmas Wrap Up digitally, featuring two cover songs: "Snowflake" by Bucky and "Christmas Time (Is Here Again)" by the Beatles. The band's sixth album, 1st Congregational Church of Eternal Love and Free Hugs, was released on 10 June 2022 and was preceded by the single "The Once and Future King". Another single, "Cherry Plum Tree (Farewell Beautiful Dreamer)" was released on 29 July 2022, and on 4 November 2022 they released "Gimme Some Truth", a John Lennon cover.

In 2023, the band embarked on a world tour including stops in the UK, Japan, the U.S. and Canada and debuted new material from their upcoming seventh studio album.

On July 28, 2023, Kula Shaker released "Waves" as their new single and announced additional tour dates in Germany, Belgium and France. After initially postponing their tour dates from February and March 2023, Kula Shaker toured North America in September 2023.

Kula Shaker's seventh studio album, Natural Magick, was released on 2 February 2024 on all formats and major streaming services. The album contains 13 tracks and is the first since Peasants, Pigs & Astronauts to feature original keyboardist, Jay Darlington.

Kula Shaker released their eighth studio album Wormslayer on 30 January 2026, this 11 track album featured the singles "Charge of the Light Brigade", "Good Money", "Lucky Number" and "Wormslayer". As part of a collaboration with Jacaranda Records and Fat Monkey Studios, a single-sided 7" record in an edition of 100 was released for Record Store Day 2026 featuring a recording of album cut "Day for Night", recorded utilising Jacaranda's vintage 1948 Mutoscope Voice-o-Graph.

== Musical style and media response ==
Although Kula Shaker's sound owes a lot to the classic rock bands of 1960s and 1970s, the songs often combine Eastern-influenced sonics ("Govinda") with lyrical themes of a universal spirituality quest, employing ideas of soul and devotion from diverse traditions such as Hinduism ("Tattva"), to Christianity ("Great Hosannah") and even Native American Indian ("Infinite Sun").

Noel Gallagher was an early champion of the band, inviting them to support at Oasis' historic Knebworth concerts, but from the outset of their career, Kula Shaker polarised UK media opinion. At the height of Britpop and 'lad culture', music publications like Melody Maker, Select and NME often focused on the class angle and ridiculed the band's fascination with Indian culture. Mills commented in 2016, "The musical styles on K are mainstream now. [In 1996] people didn't know how to understand it or where to place it, so all that was left to do was deride it." They were seen as coming from privileged middle-class backgrounds. Speaking in an interview in 2016, Mills says "When I was in private schools, they called me 'common', and when I was in state schools they called me 'posh'. It made me very cynical about all these labels."

== Members ==
=== Members ===
- Crispian Mills – lead vocals, guitars, tamboura, harmonica (1993–1999, 2004–present)
- Alonza Bevan – bass, additional guitars, piano, vocals (1993–1999, 2004–present)
- Paul Winterhart – drums, percussion, occasional backing vocals (1993–1999, 2004–present)
- Jay Darlington – keyboards, organ, piano, Mellotron, occasional backing vocals (1994–1999, 2022–present)

=== Former members ===
- Saul Dismont – vocals (1993–1994)
- Henry "Harry" Bowers-Broadbent – keyboards, organ, piano, backing vocals (2006–2022)

== Discography ==
- K (1996)
- Peasants, Pigs & Astronauts (1999)
- Strangefolk (2007)
- Pilgrims Progress (2010)
- K 2.0 (2016)
- 1st Congregational Church of Eternal Love and Free Hugs (2022)
- Natural Magick (2024)
- Wormslayer (2026)
- K-Reinkarnate (2027)
