= Paul Winterhart =

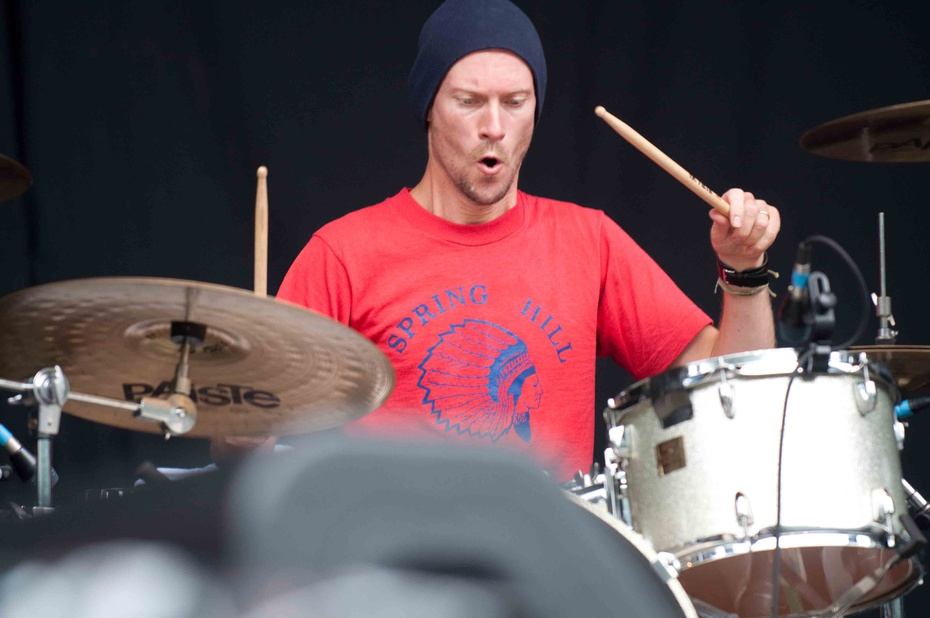
- Winter-Hart performing with Kula Shaker in 2010

Background information
- Born: Paul Winter-Hart; 19 September 1971 (age 55); Hammersmith, London, England
- Origin: East Pennard, Somerset, England
- Genres: Rock, Indie, alternative rock, psychedelic
- Occupation: Musician
- Instrument: Drummer
- Years active: 1988–present
- Labels: Columbia; Strangefolk
- Formerly of: Kula Shaker; Thirteen:13; Goldray; Black Casino & The Ghost
- Website: kulashaker.co.uk

Paul Winter-Hart (born 19 September 1971) is an English musician, best known as the drummer for the rock band Kula Shaker. He grew up in East Pennard, Somerset, and is noted for being reserved in interviews.

In between Kula Shaker splitting in 1999 and reforming in 2006, Winterhart played drums for Thirteen:13, did sessions work with Aqualung and formed blues-rock band "Zero Point Field", who prior to Kula Shaker reforming were working on their debut album. After Kula Shaker released Pilgrims Progress, Winterhart also played in the Somerset psychedelic rock band Goldray, with Reef guitarist Kenwyn House, and the London-based alternative rock band Black Casino & The Ghost.

Winter-Hart lives in Lower Clapton, Hackney, London, with his wife, Nicole, his children, Ivy and Faye, and his Newfoundland dog, Willow. Willow is so large that she was once mistakenly believed to be the "Beast of Hackney Marshes".

He also briefly played in a reformed line-up of punk band X-Ray Spex under the name "Pauli OhAirt" in 1995.
