= Alonza Bevan =

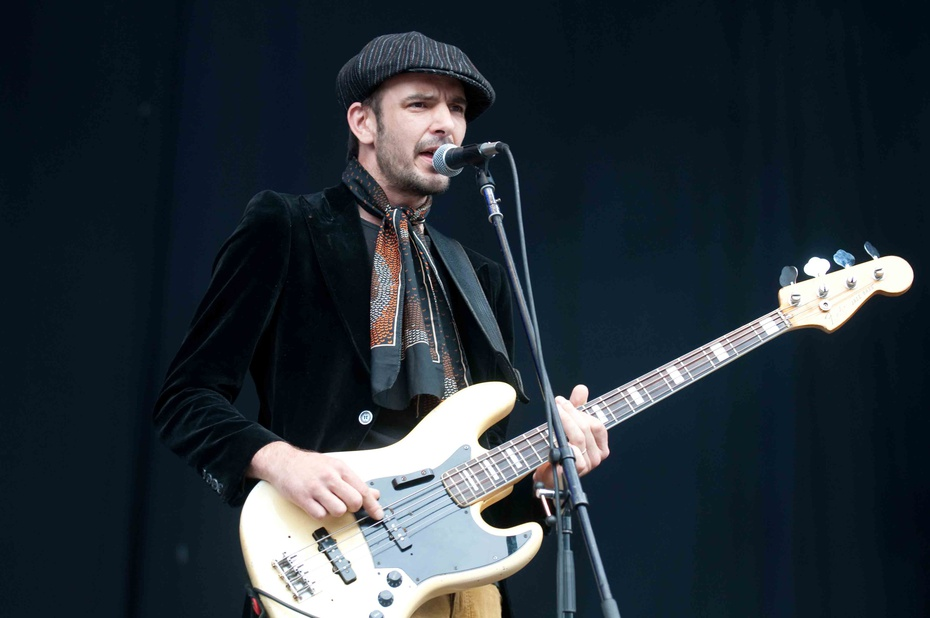
- Bevan performing with Kula Shaker in 2010

Background information
- Born: Alonza George Bevan; 24 October 1970 (age 55); Hounslow, Middlesex, England
- Genres: Rock; indie rock; alternative rock; psychedelic
- Occupation: Musician
- Instruments: Bass; piano; vocals; guitar
- Years active: 1988–present
- Labels: Columbia, Strangefolk
- Member of: Kula Shaker; Tumblewild
- Formerly of: Johnny Marr + the Healers
- Website: www.kulashakermusic.com

Alonza George Bevan (born 24 October 1970) is an English musician who is the bassist for the English rock band Kula Shaker.

In between Kula Shaker splitting in 1999 and reforming in 2004, Bevan played in a number of groups including Johnny Marr's band, The Healers.

In 2011, Bevan formed Tumblewild with his wife and former Mediæval Bæbes singer Audrey Evans, and released the 7" and digital download single "Sinnerman" in July 2011. Their first album "When The World Had Four Corners" was released in 2014 by the label MondoTunes.

In 2022, Bevan acted as a producer on The Stanfords self-titled first album.
