= Night People (Classix Nouveaux album) =

Studio album by Classix Nouveaux
- Released: 1981
- Studio: Regents Park Studios, London
- Genre: New wave
- Label: Liberty
- Producer: Sal Solo, Mik Sweeney

Classix Nouveaux chronology
| Night People (1981) | La Verité (1982) |

Professional ratings
Review scores
| Source | Rating |
|---|---|
| Trouser Press | mixed |

Night People is the debut studio album by English new wave band Classix Nouveaux, released in 1981 by record label Liberty. It reached number 66 in the UK Albums Chart. It peaked at number 85 in Australia.

== Track listing ==
| No. | Title | Writer(s) | Length |
|---|---|---|---|
| 1. | "Foreward" (instrumental) | Sal Solo, Mik Sweeney | 3:25 |
| 2. | "Guilty" | Solo | 4:42 |
| 3. | "Run Away" | Solo | 2:42 |
| 4. | "No Sympathy No Violins" | Solo, Sweeney | 4:07 |
| 5. | "Inside Outside" | Solo, Sweeney | 4:21 |
| 6. | "623 Degrees" (instrumental) | Classix Nouveaux | 2:30 |
| 7. | "Every Home Should Have One" | Solo, Sweeney | 3:55 |
| 8. | "Tokyo" | Solo, Sweeney | 2:39 |
| 9. | "Or a Movie" | Solo | 4:32 |
| 10. | "Soldier" | Solo, Sweeney | 3:46 |
| 11. | "The Protector of Night" | Solo | 5:23 |

Bonus tracks on 2003 CD release
| No. | Title | Writer(s) | Length |
|---|---|---|---|
| 12. | "Robot's Dance" | Solo | 3:56 |
| 13. | "Nasty Little Green Men" | Solo | 3:16 |
| 14. | "Test Tube Babies" | Solo | 2:47 |
| 15. | "Night People" | Solo | 3:54 |
| 16. | "Old World for Sale" | Solo | 2:37 |
| 17. | "627" | Solo | 2:31 |
| 18. | "We Don't Bite" | Solo | 3:24 |

USA vinyl release (1981)
| No. | Title | Writer(s) | Length |
|---|---|---|---|
| 19. | "Foreward" | Solo, Sweeney | 3:32 |
| 20. | "Guilty" | Solo | 3:31 |
| 21. | "Nasty Little Green Men" | Solo | 3:15 |
| 22. | "No Sympathy" | Solo, Sweeney | 4:06 |
| 23. | "Inside Outside" | Solo, Sweeney | 4:19 |
| 24. | "623" | Classix Nouveaux | 2:27 |
| 25. | "Robots Dance" | Solo | 3:55 |
| 26. | "Every Home" | Solo, Sweeney | 3:15 |
| 27. | "Tokyo" | Solo, Sweeney | 2:37 |
| 28. | "Run Away" | Solo | 2:39 |
| 29. | "The Protector of Night" | Solo | 5:22 |

== Personnel ==
- Sal Solo – vocals, keyboards, synthesizer, guitar
- Mik Sweeney – bass guitar, keyboards, synthesizer, backing vocals
- Gary Steadman – guitar, guitar synthesizer
- B.P. Hurding – drums, electronic percussion, saxophone, backing vocals

Technical

- Rob Arenstein – engineer
- Falcon Stuart – management
- John Pasche – sleeve design
- Ron Mercer – watch illustration
