= Conscious Consumer =

Studio album by X-Ray Spex
- Released: 28 September 1995
- Recorded: 1995
- Studio: Livingston Studios, Wood Green, London; The Strongroom, Shoreditch, London
- Genre: New wave; pop-punk
- Length: 39:09
- Label: Receiver
- Producer: Poly Styrene

X-Ray Spex chronology
Germfree Adolescents (1978)	Conscious Consumer (1995)

Conscious Consumer is the second and final studio album by English punk rock band X-Ray Spex, the first new material recorded by the band in seventeen years. It was recorded in 1995 and released in September of that year by record label Receiver. The album saw the return of saxophonist Lora Logic, sacked from the original incarnation of the band but reconciled with singer Poly Styrene during the '80s, as well as original bassist Paul Dean. Original members Jak Airport and B.P. Hurding were replaced by Crispian Mills (as Red Spectre) and Paul Winterhart (as Pauli OhAirt), who would later achieve success as members of Kula Shaker.

== Reception ==
Professional ratings
Review scores
Source	Rating
AllMusic	3/5 stars

The A.V. Club wrote that the album "revived the group's original anti-consumerist stance, but tempered it with Styrene's newfound serenity on songs like 'Prayer for Peace'", while Richie Unterberger of AllMusic echoed similar sentiments.

== Track listing ==
All tracks are written by Poly Styrene, except where noted.

No.	Title	Writer(s)	Length
1.	"Cigarettes"		2:48
2.	"Junk Food Junkie"		3:23
3.	"Crystal Clear"		4:33
4.	"India"		3:22
5.	"Dog in Sweden"	Styrene; Peter-Paul Hartnett	3:15
6.	"Hi Chaperone"		2:59
7.	"Good Time Girl"		3:00
8.	"Melancholy"		3:53
9.	"Sophia"		2:50
10.	"Peace Meal"		2:32
11.	"Prayer for Peace"		4:00
12.	"Party"		2:49

== Personnel ==
X-Ray Spex

- Poly Styrene – vocals
- Red Spectre – guitar, "guitar arrangements"
- Lora Logic – saxophone, "saxophone melodies"
- Paul Dean – bass, "bass lines"
- Pauli OhAirt – drums, "drum energy"

with:

- Peter-Paul Hartnett – Japanese backing vocals and dog howl, photography
- Andrew Scarth, Gareth Jones, James Thompson, John Mallison, Simon Burwell, Tony Harris - "engineering and sonic architecture"
