= Jak Airport =

- Born: Jack Stafford; 22 February 1958; Catford, London, England
- Died: 13 August 2004 (aged 46)
- Genres: New wave, glam rock, punk rock
- Occupation: Musician
- Instrument: Guitar
- Years active: 1970s–1980s
- Formerly of: Puncture, X-Ray Spex, Airport and Dean, Classix Nouveaux

Jak Airport (born Jack Stafford; 22 February 1958 – 13 August 2004) was the guitarist of 1970s punk band X-Ray Spex and new wave band Classix Nouveaux.

Born and raised in Catford, London, Jak Airport is best known and remembered for being a member of punk rock band X-Ray Spex, contributing with songs like "Oh Bondage Up Yours!" and "The Day The World Turned Day-Glo".

The beginning riff of the latter song was considered a classic by the band's singer Poly Styrene. He joined the band after leaving another punk group called Puncture. When X-Ray Spex disbanded in 1979, he and the group's bassist Paul Dean formed Airport and Dean.

In 1979, he and fellow X-Ray Spex member, drummer BP Hurding formed, alongside singer Sal Solo, the new wave band Classix Nouveaux, but he had left the band by the end of the year. He retired from the music industry then worked at VVL London and also in the BBC's corporate and public relations department.

== Death ==
Airport died of cancer on 13 August 2004, aged 46.
