= Oh Bondage Up Yours! =

Single by X-Ray Spex
- B-side: "I Am a Cliché"
- Released: 30 September 1977
- Genre: Punk rock
- Length: 2:45
- Label: Virgin
- Songwriter: Poly Styrene

"Oh Bondage Up Yours!" is the debut single by English punk rock band X-Ray Spex. Released in September 1977, it is regarded by critics as a prototypic example of British punk, though it was not a chart hit.

== Background ==
A version taped on 2 April 1977 at one of the band's earliest public performances had already been issued on a live compilation album, The Roxy London WC2, in June.

The song attracted wide notice and led directly to the band's first record deal—a pact with the Virgin label for one single.

Poly Styrene, X-Ray Spex's songwriter as well as lead vocalist, had been motivated to join the punk scene like many others as a result of attending a Sex Pistols concert—her first encounter with the band, when she still went by Marianne Elliot-Said, was in Hastings in early July 1976. Concerned with issues of consumerism and disposability, reflected in the name she soon adopted, she wrote "Oh Bondage Up Yours!" shortly after seeing the Pistols for a second time the following month. The lyrics combine a depiction of contemporary capitalist materialism as a brand of servitude with a "feminist [...] rallying cry". Styrene later described it as "a call for liberation. It was saying: 'Bondage—forget it! I'm not going to be bound by the laws of consumerism or bound by my own senses.' It has that line in it: 'Chain smoke, chain gang, I consume you all': you are tied to these activities for someone else's profit."

X-Ray Spex' instrumental lineup featured a saxophonist, unusual for a punk band. What made the woodwind player particularly stand out was that she was a girl, Susan Whitby (known as Lora Logic), just 16 years old as of mid-1977. Band manager Falcon Stuart had helped convince Styrene that the presence of a second woman in the band would be a boon to their marketing.

== Content ==
"Oh Bondage Up Yours!" sample
The band's debut single "Oh Bondage Up Yours!", an antimaterialistic anthem considered "one of punk rock's defining moments." As Lora Logic's saxophone "serrate[s] right through the ubiquitous guitar-buzzsaw", Poly Styrene sings "in a voice somewhere between that of a wailing baby and that of a banshee".

Whitby's "freeform" style on her horn, writes Maria Raha, often yielded "staccato wails that faded quickly, like those of a sax player whizzing by in a car". Redubbed Lora Logic, her signature "rough rasp" would feature prominently in "Oh Bondage Up Yours!"

Richie Unterberger describes the single version's brief setup and raucous payoff:

"Some people think little girls should be seen and not heard," Poly Styrene solemnly intones. ... "But I think"—and then the voice suddenly rises to a scream—"OH BONDAGE UP YOURS! 1-2-3-4!" Then the band kicks in with all the immediacy of a custard pie in the face. Fuzzy power chords and careening saxophone bleats fight it out with Styrene's half-chanted, half-sung vocals, a mixture of glee and rage that periodically trails off into caterwauling shrieks.

Steve Huey describes it as "one of the most visceral moments in all of British punk", though Al Spicer considers the studio single recording a "fairly lacklustre" version.

In Gillian G. Gaar's analysis, the song "eagerly steamrolled over the idea of objectifying women by confronting the notion head on". Raha writes, "Styrene and Logic were joyfully angry, liberated by the freedom punk afforded them." In Lauraine Leblanc's view, Styrene's compositions, and "Oh Bondage Up Yours!" in particular, exemplify the emphasis female punk artists placed on parody and paradox. As she describes, the first verse goes

"Bind me, tie me, chain me to the wall / I wanna be a slave to you all!" Paradoxically, the chorus [runs]: "Oh bondage! Up yours! / Oh bondage! Come on!" As Styrene continue[s] on to the second verse, she reveal[s] that the song is not about sex, but about consumerism: "Chain store, chain smoke, I consume you all / Chain gang, chain mail, I don't think at all!" In this one utterance, Styrene transformed a seemingly masochistic plea into an indictment of consumer culture, denouncing the blind impulses of the mainstream shopper. In depicting herself as both an agent of and resister to her submission, she created a parody of both positions, juxtaposing them powerfully against each other.

Logic later gave her view of the band leader's vision: "I think Marianne felt that everyone was in a type of bondage—restricted, crushed, and alienated by modern materialistic society. The goal of our society is sense gratification—that is the only prize on offer. But one can never satisfy the senses; it is an impossible goal."

== Release and reception ==
Banned by the BBC though broadcast on the BBC Cymru Wales music programme Twndish, the single was very well received by critics, and though it failed to register on the charts, it made the band a subject of extensive media interest. According to Gaar, among punk aficionados the single "quickly became an essential item that found its way into every self-respecting" collection. Retrospectively, John Dougan identifies it, alongside the early recordings of the Sex Pistols and the Clash, as "one of punk rock's defining moments". Jon Savage similarly calls it a "deserved press sensation" and a "definitive punk snapshot".

Within a few weeks of its release, Logic departed the band, apparently sacked because Styrene wanted to be the exclusive focus of attention. The band, now with a male saxophonist, signed with EMI for its debut album, Germfree Adolescents, on which "Oh Bondage Up Yours!" did not appear.

In 2021, it was ranked at No. 120 on Rolling Stone's "Top 500 Best Songs of All Time".

== Personnel ==
- Poly Styrene (Marianne Elliot-Said) – vocals
- Lora Logic (Susan Whitby) – saxophone
- Jak Airport (Jack Stafford) – guitar
- Paul Dean – bass
- B. P. Hurding – drums
