= La vérité (Classix Nouveaux album) =

Studio album by Classix Nouveaux
- Released: 1982
- Genre: New wave
- Label: Liberty
- Producer: Sal Solo, Mik Sweeney

Classix Nouveaux chronology
Night People (1981)	La vérité (1982)	Secret (1983)

La vérité is the second studio album by English new wave band Classix Nouveaux, released in 1982 by record label Liberty. It reached number 44 in the UK Albums Chart, their highest-charting album to date.

== Reception ==
Professional ratings
Review scores
Source	Rating
AllMusic	3/5 stars
Smash Hits	7/10 stars

Smash Hits magazine gave a mostly positive review, likening the band to Ultravox but stating that they took themselves too seriously. Trouser Press called the album "over the top, being far too intricate and overblown".

== Track listing ==
No.	Title	Writer(s)	Length
1.	"Foreward"	Sal Solo	1:08
2.	"Is It a Dream"	Sal Solo	4:16
3.	"To Believe"	Solo, Mik Sweeney	3:46
4.	"Because You're Young"	Solo	3:47
5.	"Six to Eight"	Solo	1:58
6.	"La Verité"	Solo	5:12
7.	"Never Again"	Solo, Sweeney	4:06
8.	"It's All Over"	Solo	3:55
9.	"1999"	Solo, Sweeney	3:45
10.	"I Will Return"	Solo, Sweeney	5:43
11.	"Finale"	Solo	2:34

Bonus tracks on 2002 CD release
No.	Title	Writer(s)	Length
12.	"It's Not Too Late"	Solo, Sweeney	3:23
13.	"Where to Go"	Solo, Sweeney	3:14

== Personnel ==
- Sal Solo - lead vocals, keyboards, synthesizer, guitar
- Mik Sweeney - bass guitar, keyboards, synthesizer, backing vocals
- Gary Steadman - guitar, guitar synthesizer
- B.P. Hurding - drums, percussion, saxophone

Technical

- Ron Hill - engineer
- Mark McGuire, Tim Palmer - tape op
- Simon Fowler - cover photography
