= Statue of Winston Churchill =

There have been numerous prominent statues of Winston Churchill. These include:

== In the United Kingdom ==
- Statue of Winston Churchill, Palace of Westminster
- Statue of Winston Churchill, Parliament Square
- Statue of Winston Churchill, Woodford
- Statue of Winston Churchill, Guildhall

== In the United States ==
- Statue of Winston Churchill (Washington, D.C.)

== In Canada ==
- Statue of Winston Churchill (Toronto)
- Statue of Winston Churchill (Halifax)

== In France ==
- Statue of Winston Churchill, Paris

== See also ==
- Bust of Winston Churchill, Mishkenot Sha'ananim, Jerusalem
