= Portrait of Winston Churchill =

Portrait of Winston Churchill may refer to:

- Portrait of Winston Churchill (Sutherland), a destroyed painting by Graham Sutherland
- The Roaring Lion, a photograph by Yousuf Karsh

== See also ==
- Statue of Winston Churchill (disambiguation)
