= Puncture (band) =

English punk rock band

- Origin: Islington, London
- Genres: Punk rock
- Years active: 1976–1978
- Label: Small Wonder
- Spinoffs: X-Ray Spex
- Past members: Paul McCallum; Steve Counsel; Jak Stafford; Marty Truss; Eric Electroid; Anthony Keen

Puncture were an early English punk rock group. Founded in the summer of 1976, this Islington, London based, four-piece combo consisted of Paul McCallum (guitar/vocals), Steve Counsel (bass/vocals), Jak Stafford (guitar/vocals) and "The Fabulous" Marty Truss (drums). Their influences ranged from early The Who, The Kinks, Small Faces, to Roxy Music, David Bowie, blues, rhythm and blues, and The Bonzo Dog Doo-Dah Band.

Their first major gig was in November 1976, at Fulham Town Hall in London a week after an early gig by The Clash. Various personnel changes ensued, with Jak Stafford leaving to join prominent punk band X-Ray Spex, as Jak Airport. A brief tenure with guitarist Eric Electroid (aka Kenny) saw them move on to pastures new, with the recruitment of band member Anthony Keen on synthesizer and keyboards.

In October 1977 they released the single "Mucky Pup"/"Can't Rock & Roll (In a Council Flat)", the first release (Small One) for the Small Wonder Records label, based in Hoe Street, Walthamstow, London. 2,000 copies of the single sold out, prompting Small Wonder Records to press another 1,000 singles. "Mucky Pup" gained much airplay at various punk gigs throughout 1977, and the B-side, "Can't Rock & Roll (In a Council Flat)" was played on the BBC Radio 1 John Peel Show. They continued to play various gigs around London, notably at the punk club The Roxy in Covent Garden, supporting The Wasps and The Man in the Moon in Kings Road, Chelsea, supporting The Fruit Eating Bears. They continued gigging until January 1978, culminating in their farewell gig on 20 January 1978 at the Basement Club in Covent Garden, London.

In the 1980s, The Exploited covered Puncture's song "Mucky Pup" on their album Punks Not Dead.

Like so many other English punk singles of the time, original copies of the Puncture single now sell for up to £30.

"Mucky Pup" is available on the Small Wonder Vol. 1: Punk Singles Collection and on PUNK 45 Vol. 2. "Can't Rock N Roll (In A Council Flat)" is on Small Wonder Vol.2: Punk Singles Collection compilation albums.
