= Translucence (Poly Styrene album) =

Studio album by Poly Styrene
- Released: 1980
- Studio: Matrix Studios, London
- Genre: Post-punk
- Length: 40:27
- Label: United Artists / Receiver Records
- Producer: Ted Bunting

Professional ratings
Review scores
| Source | Rating |
|---|---|
| Allmusic | 4.5/5 stars |
| Robert Christgau | A− |
| Smash Hits | 7/10 |

Translucence is a 1980 post-punk album by Poly Styrene.

== Track listing ==
All tracks composed by Poly Styrene

1. "Dreaming" (3:48)
2. "Talk In Toytown" (3:21)
3. "Skydive" (4:10)
4. "Day That Time Forgot" (3:30)
5. "Shades" (3:20)
6. "Essence" (3:32)
7. "Hip City Hip" (3:02)
8. "Bicycle Song" (2:32)
9. "Sub Tropical" (3:04)
10. "Translucence" (3:12)
11. "Age" (3:09)
12. "Goodbye" (3:47)

== Personnel ==
- Poly Styrene - vocals
- G.T. Moore - guitar
- Richard Moore - guitar
- Kuma Harada - bass
- Richard Bailey - drums
- Darryl Lee Que - percussion
- Kevin McAlea - keyboards
- Ted Bunting - saxophone, flute

Technical

- Falcon Stuart - cover photography
