= Falcon Stuart =

Falcon Nemon-Stuart (27 March 1941 – 27 February 2002) was a British photographer, retailer, filmmaker, manager and music producer associated with X-Ray Spex, Adam and the Ants, and Danielle Dax amongst others.

== Personal life ==
Born in Oxford in 1941 as Falcon Nemon, Stuart was the son of the sculptor Oscar Nemon and Patricia Villiers-Stuart (daughter of Constance Villiers-Stuart). He married Alice Hiller in 1982, while living in London, and they had two sons. Falcon Stuart died in 2002.

== Early career ==
Having been influenced in his teenage years by American rock and roll 45s and London jazz clubs, Stuart moved rapidly from working for society photographer Tom Hustler, to having his own Pimlico studio. Stuart's fashion shots were featured in Vogue, Harper's Bazaar and the national press, and exhibited at the Hampstead and Kingsway Galleries. He also drove a customised Mini – with a tent on the roof – round the Mediterranean, on largely unmade roads, to photograph BP's oil installations.

During the 1960s, Stuart opened The Bistrotheque, a bistro with a resident DJ with partners in Victoria Street in 1965, while setting up Splash Posters, which produced screen-printed posters, with another business partner. The all white Jumpahead boutique followed in 1967, where printed jersey and paper clothes could be seen through a seven-inch viewing slit cut in the blanked out window.

Subsequently enrolling at the London International Film School in 1969, Stuart became involved in underground film-making, winning the 'Sucker's Award' at the first Wet Dream Film Festival in Amsterdam in 1970. After graduating in 1971, Stuart remained underground and worked with Nic Roeg on Roeg's 1972 film Glastonbury Fayre. He also directed, amongst others, films on Peter Blake and Robert Altman, a segment of the Dutch film Dreams of Thirteen, and finally Penetration, which explored the European hardcore scene of the early 1970s. Shown at Cannes in 1974 – the first film of its genre – it was retitled French Blue for the American market, where it unexpectedly reached no. 18 in the Variety Top 50, grossing $15,000,000.

== Music ==
Experience in writing and producing film soundtracks positioned Stuart to play a key role in the new wave explosion of the mid-1970s. He originally produced "Silly Billy", a feminist reggae track for Mari Elliot in 1976, but both careers shifted hugely after a seismic encounter with the Sex Pistols:

It was the summer of 76 at the end of Hastings Pier. The senior citizens were ballroom surfing in the tearooms on the first floor, but something strange was happening downstairs in the disco space. The Sex Pistols had landed. They were pounding through their set in front of a small exclusive London audience on an awayday excursion to the seaside. After three minutes you knew they were going to make it: the new order was on its way.

— Falcon Stuart, Unpublished Memoir

Marian Elliot adopted the name Poly Styrene, and formed the punk band X-Ray Spex, with most of the band's members living in Stuart's Fulham home. Stuart served as their producer, manager, and often photographer, and played a key role in helping create the band's first album, Germfree Adolescents. He also promoted a twice-weekly gig at the Man in the Moon following the closure of The Roxy, where X-Ray Spex played, and where Adam Ant would launch his career.

When X-Ray Spex disbanded, Stuart then helped effect the transformation of former punk Adam Ant. Stuart mortgaged his house to fund new recordings and the fourteen-date sell-out 'Ants Invasion' tour from May to July 1980. This led to Adam and the Ants being signed by CBS for the No. 1 album Kings of the Wild Frontier on 16 July 1980. Stuart and Ant parted company in 1981.

During the 1980s, Stuart remained active in the music business, managing and touring globally with the New Romantic band Classix Nouveaux, formed by former X-Ray Spex members Jak Airport and B.P. Hurding, as well as ska/pop act Amazulu, and Swedish rock pop band Trance Dance, while also setting up the independent label Awesome Records, distributed by Rough Trade and the Cartel. Danielle Dax released the acclaimed albums Jesus Egg That Wept, Inky Bloaters and Cat-House on Awesome before signing to Sire Records.

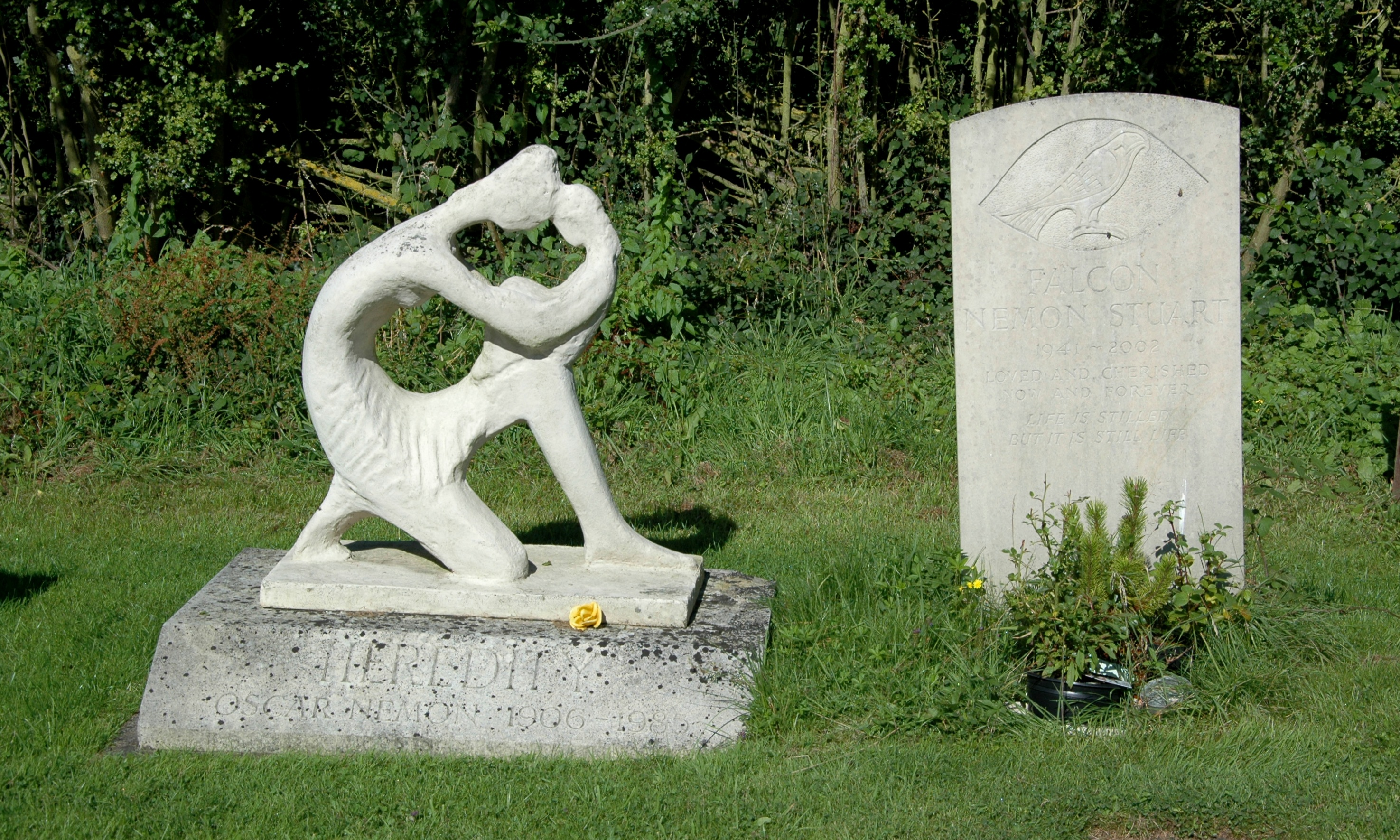
Graves of Falcon Stuart (right) and his sculptor father Oscar Nemon (left) at Wootton, Vale of White Horse, Oxfordshire

Stuart remained involved with the British music scene in the 1990s, while also expanding East. Classix Nouveaux had been the first band to play in Poland in 1982 after the Solidarity uprising as part of the 'bread and circus' policy of the government of the time, and in January 1992 he took Crunch to play at the Ms. Rock Europe festival at the Palace "Ukraine" in Kyiv, and in Kharkiv Prison. Other performers included most notably La Toya Jackson, who played in Chernobyl itself for the ninth anniversary concert to commemorate the disaster. Stuart also helped format and provide material for the music show Post, which aired twice weekly to 5 million Ukrainian viewers between 1993 and 1998, and a weekly Best British Video half-hour on the Noviy Kanal, which ran for two years.

Stuart's archive has been donated to John Moores University in Liverpool, where it will be available for public access from the autumn of 2011.
