= Constance Villiers-Stuart =

English painter

- Constance Villiers Stuart in 1914
- Born: Constance Mary Fielden; 1876; Beachamwell, Norfolk, England
- Died: 1966 (aged 88–89)
- Known for: garden historian, journalist, water-colour painter and suffragist
- Spouse: Patrick Villiers-Stuart (m. 1908)
- Children: Falcon Nemon-Stuart (grandson)

Constance Mary Villiers-Stuart (née Fielden, 1876 – 1966) was an English garden historian, journalist, water-colour painter and suffragist. She published the first full length study of Mughal Gardens and campaigned for New Delhi to follow an Indian town plan.

== Early life ==
Villiers-Stuart was born Constance Mary Fielden in 1876. She was raised at the Georgian Beachamwell Hall in Norfolk, until it was destroyed by fire in 1903. She was an heiress of a large fortune which had been generated from her families Lancashire based cotton production business. She was educated by a governess then studied painting in Paris and Rome.

Fielden married Patrick Villiers-Stuart, a soldier in the Royal Fusiliers, in 1908. They moved to British India, after his posting, in January 1911. They had one daughter, Patricia Villiers-Stuart.

Villiers-Stuart was considered highly persuasive, and on one occasion persuaded the Prince of Wales to invite her to tea at Sandringham House.

== Career ==
In India, Villiers-Stuart researched and collected material about Mughals garden, including taking a solo trip to Simla, Himachal Pradesh, where she was the guest of the Maharaja Bhupinder Singh of Patiala. Her research was published in the 1913 book, Gardens of the Great Mughals, which was the first full-length book on Mughal Gardens and launched their historical study. She was the first to discuss the Persian term chahārbāgh and to interpret it as a "large garden divided by four waterways". Her book also included sketches and watercolour paintings, including of the Taj Mahal and Delhi Palace, and she had photographed an ornate marble swing in the gardens of the Deeg Palace.

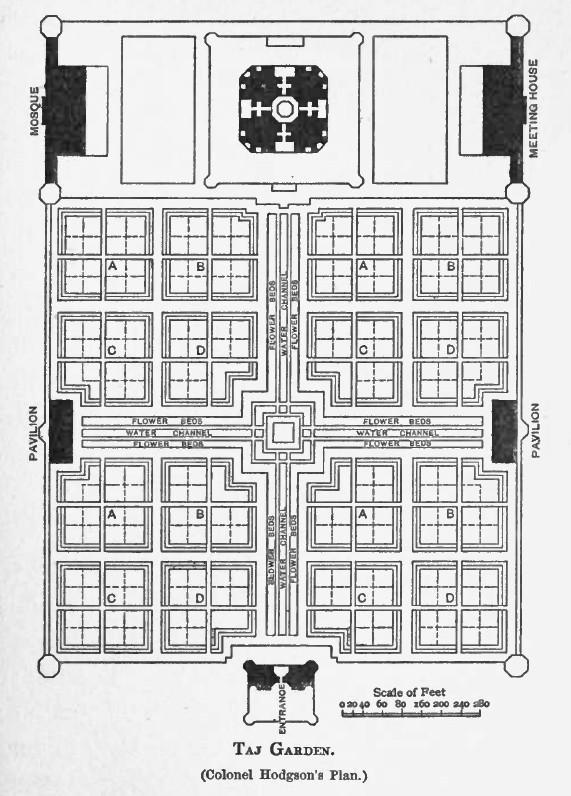
Plan of the Taj Mahal gardens by Villiers-Stuart

In her book, chapter XII, titled "Some garden contrasts and a dream," urges respect for Indian design traditions. The "dream" in the chapter title concerned her hopes to influence the design of New Delhi. Villiers-Stuart's called for New Delhi to follow an Indian town plan and mobilised the Royal Society of Arts in London to support the idea. She conversed on the matter with architect Edwin Lutyens, who also read her book. Working with Gertrude Jekyll had also given Lutyens a sympathy for garden design.

Both Lutyens and the Viceroy of India, Lord Charles Hardinge, were impressed with her ideas, which was important for her as they were designing both the new capital city and the Viceroy's palace. The result was the famous Mughal Garden of what is now Rashtrapati Bhavan, the official residence of the President of India.

During World War I, her husband was posted to Gallipoli and she accompanied him to the front line, staying at the Hotel Splendid in Salonica. Her husband had written earlier to his mother, saying that: "she is nearly sure to come here and I don't suppose anything I could have said would have stopped her.” While in Salonica, Villiers-Stuart wrote about the native flowers of Macedonia for the British Country Life magazine.

Villiers-Stuart later published her second book Spanish Gardens: Their History, Types and Features, after completing a solo research trip in the mid-1920s to visit the Moorish gardens of Spain. This book made comparisons between the Spanish garden designs and the Mughal Gardens of her previous work.

== Suffrage activism ==
Villiers-Stuart was the secretary of the National Union of Societies for Equal Citizenship (NUSEC). She campaigned in 1919 for some Indian women to be granted the right to vote in elections, such as landowners and university graduates.

== Death and legacy ==
Villiers-Stuart died in 1966.

In 2018, the Beachamwell Local History Group gave a talk on Villiers-Stuart's life called "Constance Villiers Stuart in India: From Beachamwell to Bharatpur."

In 2022, the Garden Museum in London showed some her paintings in the exhibition "Constance Villiers-Stuart: Earthly Delights", after the donation of her private archive to the Archive of Garden Design by her granddaughters.

The same year, Mary Ann Prior published a biography of Villiers-Stuart's life, titled Constance Villiers Stuart: In Search of Paradise.

== Descendants ==
Villiers-Stuart's daughter Patricia married Croatian sculptor Oscar Nemon. The grandchildren from this marriage were photographer Falcon Nemon-Stuart; Aurelia Nemon-Stuart, Lady Young, who married Conservative Party politician George Young, Baron Young of Cookham; and Electra Nemon-Stuart who married singer Phil May.

== See also ==
- History of gardening

== Sources ==
- British Library collection summary
- Prior, Mary Ann 'An Impulse of Genius', Country Life, 12 September 2018, pp. 100–104.
