= Wootton, Vale of White Horse =

Village in Oxfordshire, England

Coordinates: 51.707°N 1.313°W

Wootton
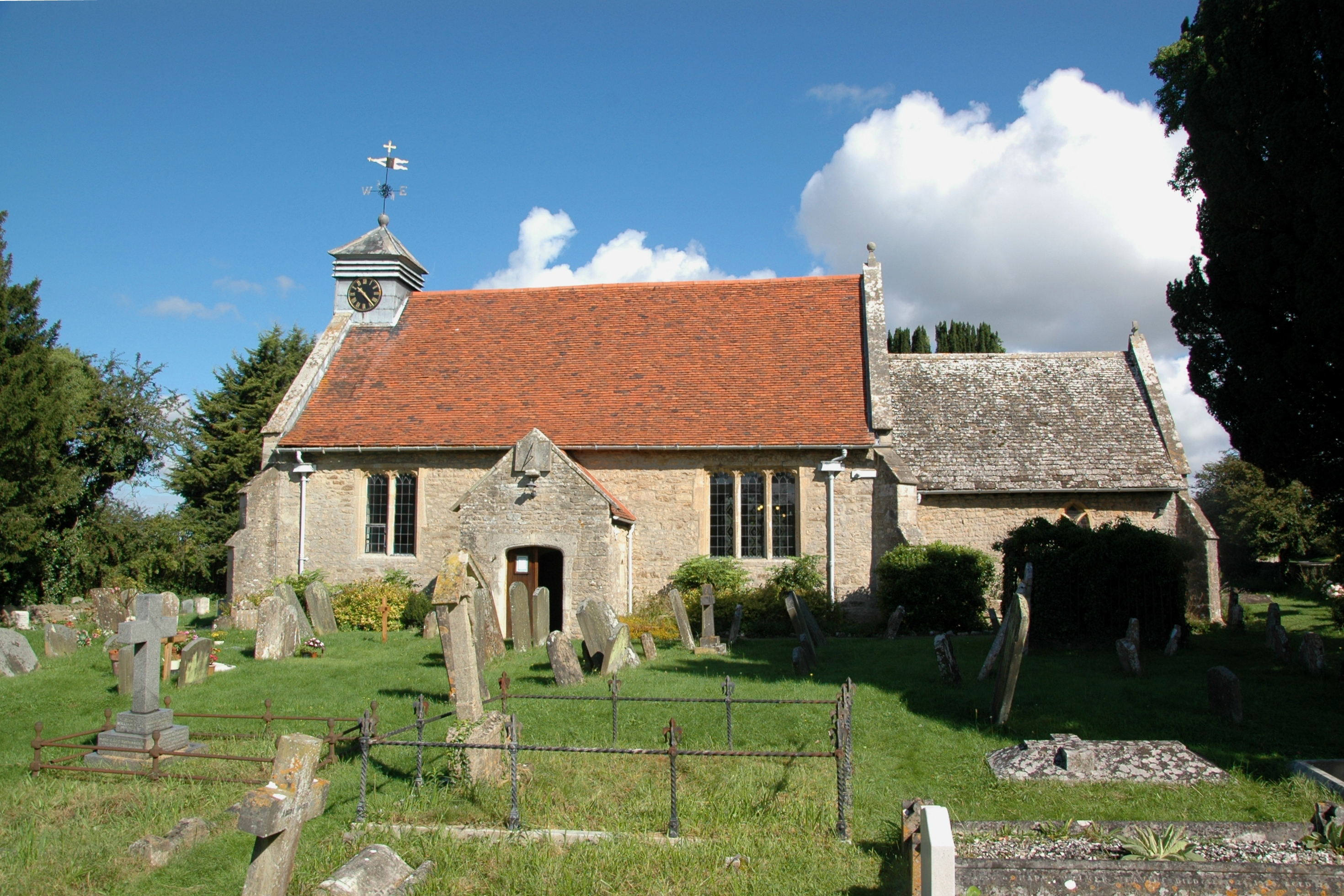
- St Peter's parish church

- Location within Oxfordshire
- Population: 2,857 (2021 Census)
- OS grid reference: SP4701
- Civil parish: Wootton
- District: Vale of White Horse
- Shire county: Oxfordshire
- Region: South East
- Country: England
- Sovereign state: United Kingdom
- Post town: Oxford
- Postcode district: OX1
- Post town: Abingdon
- Postcode district: OX13
- Dialling code: 01865
- Police: Thames Valley
- Fire: Oxfordshire
- Ambulance: South Central
- UK Parliament: Oxford West and Abingdon
- Website: Wootton Parish Council

Wootton is a village and civil parish in the Vale of White Horse about 3 miles (5 km) north-west of Abingdon. It was part of Berkshire until the 1974 boundary changes transferred it to Oxfordshire. The parish of Wootton includes the hamlets of Whitecross and Lamborough Hill and the western part of Boars Hill. The 2011 Census recorded the parish's population as 2,709.

== History ==
The Church of England parish church of Saint Peter was built in the 14th century, from which time the Decorated Gothic east window of the chancel survives. In the 15th century the nave was rebuilt with Perpendicular Gothic windows. The south door and porch are 16th century and the chancel arch may have been rebuilt in the 18th century. Until the 19th century Wootton was part of the parish of Cumnor. The first vicar of Wootton was appointed in 1885. Wootton was united in a single benefice with St. Helen's, Dry Sandford in 2000. but once again became a single parish benefice in the Abingdon Deanery in 2018. The sculptor Oscar Nemon (1906–85) and his son Falcon Stuart (1941–2002) are buried in St Peter's churchyard.

== Amenities ==
The village has a Church of England primary school. The village has a recently refurbished business park and two housing estates built between 1999 and 2009. There are a few shops in Wootton, including two convenience stores, a pharmacy, and a chip shop. There is also a dentist, a bathroom shop, a carpet shop and Sign-a-Rama. Wootton's social amenities include the Bystander public house, and a community centre where various activities take place, such as local school fêtes and a local bingo. The post office used to be next to the fish and chip shop but closed in September 2008. Now the post office is inside the Co-Operative store. In addition, the village has two recreation grounds, one of which containing a selection of Adult Swings and Slides. Some gardens in Wootton are part of the National Garden Scheme (NGS).

== Sport ==
Wootton and Dry Sandford Football Club is based in the village. It was founded in 1946 and currently plays in Division 1 of the North Berks Football League. It is the current holder of the North Berks Cup.

== Notable people ==
· Anthea Denton (AKA Nana) famous for her Blue Emulsion collaborations 'Nana Piano' and 'Nana with no Glasses' resided in Wootton from 2014 to 2023 joined by dog Bella in 2018.

== See also ==
- Wootton, West Oxfordshire

== Sources ==
- Page, W.H.; Ditchfield, P.H., eds. (1924). A History of the County of Berkshire, Volume 4. Victoria County History. pp. 398–405 Pe.
- Pevsner, Nikolaus (1966). Berkshire. The Buildings of England. Harmondsworth: Penguin Books. p. 313.
