= Symond Lawes =

English actor, photographer, businessman, and music manager

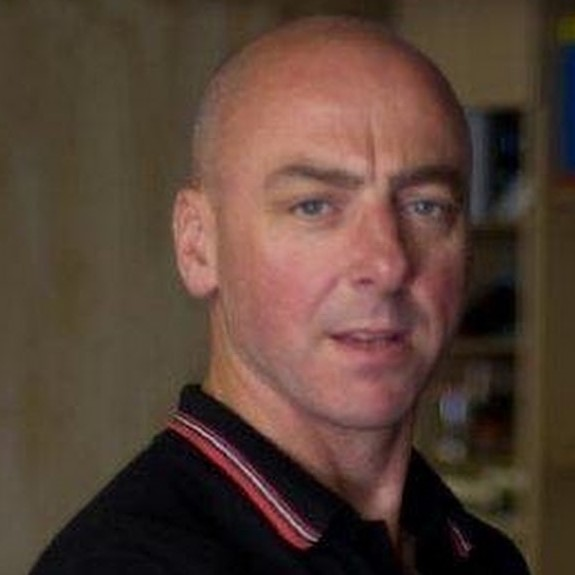
- Lawes in 2017
- Born: Brighton, England
- Occupations: Actor, photographer, music manager, events producer and businessman
- Years active: 1984–present
- Children: Two sons

Symond Lawes is an English actor, photographer, businessman, and music manager, events producer, best known for his work in several features of the 1980s and 1990s. He is also known for managing Ska bands and supporting the style and culture of skinheads.

== Life and career ==
A native of the United Kingdom, he began his career modeling at 13 and went onto appear in several features of the 1980s and 1990s, including being an accredited actor in Doctor Who, The Getaway, Dear John and The Drugs Game. He was also in high demand as a men's fashion model for Merc Clothing. In 2007 he produced an X-Ray Spex show at Camden Roundhouse. In 2011, he began the Great Skinhead Reunion in Brighton, England, and is the owner and administrator of subcultz.com. In 2014, he organized a reunion for skinheads on Brighton Beach. In 2016, he appeared in the BBC Four documentary, The Story of Skinhead by Don Letts. He played a character named Henry in The One Game released in 2020 on Amazon prime. He is also the manager of Jamaican ska band Pyramids Symarip He currently resides in his native Brighton with his two sons, performs music, and is active with photography. His sons, Archie Brewis-Lawes and Jack Brewis-Lawes, have the band called Mindofalion. So influential in the world of skinhead he has had several songs written about him including Symond (the most important skinhead in the world) by Troll Front and Symonds ego by The Hoopers who were an Oi! Band from Symond’s home town of High Wycombe.

== Filmography ==
- Meades Eats (TV Series documentary)
  - Whose Food? (2003) ... White Van Man
  - Fast Food (2003) ... Robber
- 2002 The Getaway (Video Game)- Sparky / Pedestrian (voice, as Symmond Lawes also)
- 1990 Troublemakers (TV Series)
  - Episode #1.4 (1990) ... Spud
- 1990 The Bill (TV Series)
  - Legacies (1990) ... Carl Benskin
- 1988 The Firm
  - Yeti Gang Member
- 1988 Doctor Who (TV Series)
  - Silver Nemesis: Part Two (1988) ... Skinhead
- 1988 The One Game (TV Mini-Series)
  - Saturday (1988) ... Punk 3
  - Friday (1988) ... Punk 3

*1987 Dear John (TV Series)

  - Kate Returns (1987) ... Wayne
- The Growing Pains of Adrian Mole, Barry Kents gang Skinhead (1987)
