= Essential Logic =

English post-punk band

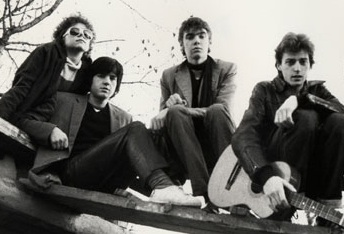

Background information
- Origin: England
- Genres: Post-punk
- Years active: 1978–1981, 2001–present
- Past members: William Bennett; David Wright; Lora Logic; Rich Tea
- Website: https://www.essential-logic.co.uk/

Essential Logic are an English post-punk band formed in 1978 by saxophonist Lora Logic after leaving X-Ray Spex. The band initially consisted of Lora on vocals, Phil Legg on guitar and vocals, William Bennett (later of Whitehouse) on guitar, Mark Turner on bass guitar, Rich Tea (Richard Thompson) on drums and Dave Wright on saxophone. Turner was later replaced by Sean Oliver (later of Rip Rig + Panic) on bass. The band split in 1981 and reformed in 2001.

== History ==
The group formed in 1978 with Logic fresh out of art school. Their first 7" was released on their own record label, Cells. They then released a self-titled EP on Virgin Records in 1979, before signing to Rough Trade. Their debut studio album, Beat Rhythm News, was released in 1979, followed by several 7"s. Work began on a second album but the band split in 1980 and the album, Pedigree Charm, was released as a Lora Logic solo LP.

Between 1978 and 1981, Logic also performed as a member of Red Crayola, as well as playing on recordings by Kollaa Kestää, The Stranglers, The Raincoats and Swell Maps.

Soon after Pedigree Charm was released in 1982 on the Rough Trade label, Logic gave up recording and performing: she had turned to the Hare Krishna religion. She did record and perform under the X-Ray Spex name again when they reformed in 1995.

She resumed Essential Logic in 2001 with a new line-up, and released a four-track EP of new material. This version of the group included ex-members of the ska group Bad Manners and guitarist Gary Valentine of Blondie. A year later, a further four tracks from a recording session in 1998 were made available from the website, Vitaminic. In 2003, an anthology of Essential Logic recordings was issued, entitled Fanfare in the Garden, on the Kill Rock Stars record label.

In 2022 a new studio album, Land of Kali was released under the Essential Logic name.

== Discography ==
Albums

Year	Title	UK Indie	Label
1979	Beat Rhythm News	11	Rough Trade
2003	Fanfare in the Garden (Anthology)	-	Kill Rock Stars
2022	Land of Kali	-	Hiss and Shake
2024	Rekalibrated	-	Hiss and Shake

Singles & EPs

Year	Title	UK Indie
1978	Aerosol Burns	-
1979	Wake Up	-
1979	Popcorn Boy Waddle Ya Do?	24
1980	Eugene	36
1980	Music Is A Better Noise	48
1981	Fanfare In The Garden	46
1981	Essential Logic	-
2002	Essential Logic 2	-
