= Lora Logic =

British saxophonist and singer

- Born: Susan Whitby; 1960 (age 65–66); Wembley, England, UK
- Genres: Punk rock; post-punk
- Instruments: Vocals; saxophone
- Years active: 1976–present
- Labels: Virgin Records; Rough Trade Records; Kill Rock Stars
- Formerly of: X-Ray Spex; Essential Logic; Red Krayola
- Website: www.essential-logic.co.uk

Lora Logic (born Susan Whitby c. 1960) is a British saxophonist, singer and songwriter from Wembley, London. Logic was a founding member of London punk band X-Ray Spex, and wrote the saxophone parts for their debut album, Germfree Adolescents. After leaving X-Ray Spex, Logic founded her own band, Essential Logic, which released one album in 1979. Logic has been called "one of post-punk's most notable atypical girls."

== Career ==
Susan Whitby was born in Wembley to a Finnish mother who worked as an air hostess and a British father. She attended an all-girls school. Her mother encouraged her and her brother to learn piano and violin, which she disliked. When she was thirteen, she asked her parents to buy her a saxophone after hearing it on several David Bowie records. In her early teens, she was a fan of David Bowie, Roxy Music and stage musicals. In 1976, at age fifteen, she saw an advert placed by Poly Styrene in the Melody Maker that read "young punx who want to stick it together". Whitby, at that point, was unfamiliar with the word punk, but telephoned Styrene asking to audition. She recalled later that she didn't play a note at the audition, but was hired by X-Ray Spex manager Falcon Stuart because he liked the idea of two young girls fronting a band.

Logic was only briefly a member X-Ray Spex, and had left the group by the time they recorded their first album, Germfree Adolescents, which nevertheless used her uncredited saxophone arrangements.

A year later, she formed Essential Logic. This group recorded one self-titled EP, five singles, and an album, Beat Rhythm News (Waddle Ya Play?). During the recording of the second Essential Logic album, the group broke up, and Logic finished the recording as a solo album, Pedigree Charm.

Logic was briefly a member of Red Krayola, appearing on two singles and the albums Soldier Talk and Kangaroo?. Her saxophone lent a unique quality to the bands she was in. She also played on recordings by The Raincoats, The Stranglers, Kollaa Kestää, Swell Maps, and later, Boy George.

In 1982 she appeared in Laura Mulvey and Peter Wollen's film Crystal Gazing, playing the character Kim; the film was named after a song from Pedigree Charm.

Along with former X-Ray Spex bandmate Poly Styrene, she left the music industry in the early 1980s to join the Hare Krishna religion. Both had been taking a lot of drugs and the move turned their lives around. She spent some time in Bhaktivedanta Manor, a mansion donated to the Hare Krishnas by George Harrison. In 1984, she had an arranged marriage at the Krishna temple, and she and her husband have two children.

In 1995, she rejoined X-Ray Spex when Styrene reformed the group, but it was brief as their egos clashed again. In 2003, the Kill Rock Stars label reissued most of the early Essential Logic material, alongside newer recordings by Logic under the Essential Logic name, as Fanfare in the Garden.

In 2022, a second Essential Logic album, Land of Kali, was released.
