= Germfree Adolescents =

Studio album by X-Ray Spex
- Released: 10 November 1978
- Recorded: 1978
- Studios: Essex Studios, Poland Street, London W1
- Genres: Punk rock; new wave
- Length: 35:51
- Label: EMI
- Producers: Falcon Stuart; X-Ray Spex

X-Ray Spex chronology
Germfree Adolescents (1978)	Conscious Consumer (1995)

Germfree Adolescents is the 1978 debut album of English punk rock band X-Ray Spex. It contained the UK hit singles "The Day the World Turned Dayglo" (No. 23 in April 1978), "Identity" (No. 24 in July 1978) and "Germ Free Adolescents" which reached No. 18 in November 1978. Upon release, the critics noted it was not all new material: five songs on the twelve tracks had already been released on A-sides and B-sides of singles.

== Reception ==
Professional ratings
Review scores
Source	Rating
AllMusic	4/5 stars
Entertainment Weekly	B+
Mojo	4/5 stars
Pitchfork	10/10
Q	4/5 stars
Record Collector	4/5 stars
Record Mirror	4/5 stars
The Rolling Stone Album Guide	5/5 stars
Spin Alternative Record Guide	10/10
Uncut	4/5 stars

From contemporary reviews, Charles Shaar Murray of NME praised the album, stating it "neatly avoids the weakness of previous Spex gigs and records (i.e. cacophony, ramshackle playing boosted by road-drill volume) while concentrating on the band's strengths (great lyrics, nifty chewns, energy and a winningly knowing innocence)." Tim Lott of Record Mirror declared the album to be "sounds for sophisticated head-bangers" and that it was "Bright music, glaring and kitsch as the pinks, greens and yellows that splash the colour. Taste in tastelessness, anarchy in tune. What did you expect from X-Ray Spex?" Jon Savage felt had too much already released material on it, noting that "The album is basically, the Spex set from early (Roxy/Man In The Moon) days and the first demo with a fair sprinkling of new additions: "Genetic Engineering", "Warrior in Woolworths", "Artificial" and the title track [...] the album features an unforgivable proportion of material already released and well-aired: five songs out of 12, three A-sides." but still concluded that "This doesn't detract from the album's playability. The sides are programmed symmetrically and sensibly [...] All the songs are built around catchy, deceptively simple riffs, often reminiscent of reggae in their jaunty lilt, and they're done full justice by the band and the production." Murray also was disappointed by the lack of new material, stating that "three A-sides (the title track, "Identity" and the immortal "The Day the World Turned Day-Glo") and one B-side ("I Am a Poseur") on an album makes for poor value in this man's supermarket." Lott critiqued some tracks, noting that "Plastic Bag" went "beyond the bounds of good kitsch". Savage echoed this statement, finding that "Plastic Bag" was the "one track that's actively annoying: the otherwise amusing "My Mind Is Like a Plastic Bag" is burdened by a cumbersome arrangement, nostalgia lyrics ("It's 1977 and we're all going mad") and Poly at her most unlistenable." Murray commented that "Plastic Bag" was "by no means as excellently realised as it was on the original X-Ray-Spex demo tapes of a year or so back (this allusion is not elitism: I just wish you could have heard that version)."

The NME ranked it the ninth best album of 1978. In his February 1979 "Consumer Guide" column in The Village Voice, critic Robert Christgau bemoaned the fact that Germfree Adolescents had not been released in the US and praised Poly Styrene's "cheerfully moralistic nursery rhymes", the songs' strong melodies and the "irresistible color" of the band's "dubiously tuned one-sax horn section". He also named the album one of the few import-only records from the 1970s he loved yet omitted from Christgau's Record Guide: Rock Albums of the Seventies (1981).

== Legacy ==
Robert Christgau later deemed Germfree Adolescents "one of British punk's strongest" albums. Trouser Press declared it "a masterpiece!" The Rough Guide to Rock calls it a "storming album".

In 1994, The Guinness Encyclopedia of Popular Music named Germfree Adolescents the eighth best punk album of all time. Seven years later, in May 2001, Spin magazine ranked the album at number five on its "50 Most Essential Punk Records" list. In March 2003, Mojo magazine ranked the record at number 19 on its "Top 50 Punk Albums" list. Germfree Adolescents is listed in the reference book 1001 Albums You Must Hear Before You Die.

In 2020, Rolling Stone ranked the album at number 354 in their list of the 500 Greatest Albums of All Time. Then in 2026, at 2 on their list of The 100 Greatest Punk Albums of All Time.

== Cover versions and cultural references ==
- Long-running California punk band NOFX has performed a cover version of Germfree Adolescents live.
- In an interview after being shortlisted for the Mercury Prize, British artist FKA Twigs named Germfree Adolescents her favourite album of all time.

== Track listing ==
All tracks written by Poly Styrene.

Side A

1. "Art-I-Ficial" – 3:24
2. "Obsessed with You" – 2:30
3. "Warrior in Woolworths" – 3:06
4. "Let's Submerge" – 3:26
5. "I Can't Do Anything" – 2:58
6. "Identity" – 2:25

Side B

1. "Genetic Engineering" – 2:49
2. "I Live Off You" – 2:09
3. "I Am a Poseur" – 2:34
4. "Germ Free Adolescents" – 3:14
5. "Plastic Bag" – 4:54
6. "The Day the World Turned Day-Glo" – 2:53

Bonus tracks

The 1991 Caroline release features four additional tracks and a rearranged song order.

1. "The Day the World Turned Dayglo" – 2:50
2. "Obsessed with You" – 2:26
3. "Genetic Engineering" – 2:46
4. "Identity" – 2:21
5. "I Live Off You" – 2:06
6. "Germ Free Adolescence" – 3:10
7. "Art-I-Ficial" – 3:21
8. "Let's Submerge" – 3:23
9. "Warrior in Woolworths" – 3:03
10. "I Am a Poseur" – 2:30
11. "I Can't Do Anything" – 2:55
12. "Highly Inflammable" – 2:32
13. "Age" – 2:36
14. "Plastic Bag" – 4:51
15. "I Am a Cliché" – 1:52
16. "Oh Bondage Up Yours!" – 2:48
- Tracks 12, 13, 15 & 16 from original singles.

The 2005 CD reissue includes the original song order and the following bonus tracks not on the original release.

13. "Oh Bondage Up Yours!" – 2:51
14. "I Am a Cliché" – 1:55
15. "Highly Inflammable" – 2:35
16. "Age" – 2:38
17. "Genetic Engineering" – 2:49
18. "Art-I-Ficial" – 3:24
19. "I Am a Poseur" – 2:34
20. "Identity" – 2:25
21. "Germ Free Adolescence" – 3:05
22. "Warrior in Woolworths" – 3:06
23. "Age" – 2:38
- Tracks 13–16 from original singles, tracks 17–20 from Peel Session 20 February 1978, tracks 21–23 from Peel Session 11 June 1978.

== Personnel ==
X-Ray Spex

- Poly Styrene – vocals
- Jak Airport – guitar
- Paul Dean – bass
- Rudi Thomson – saxophone
- B.P. Hurding – drums

Additional personnel

- Ted Bunting – saxophone on "Identity" and "The Day the World Turned Dayglo"
- Lora Logic – saxophone on "Oh Bondage Up Yours!" and "I Am a Cliché"
- Falcon Stuart – producer, cover concept
- John Mackenzie Burns – engineer
- Andy Pearce – assistant engineer
- Nick Webb – mastering
- Trevor Key – photography
- Cooke Key – sleeve

== Charts ==
Chart (1978/79)	Peak position
Australia (Kent Music Report)	56
United Kingdom (Official Charts Company)	30
