= Beat Rhythm News =

Studio album by Essential Logic
- Released: December 1979
- Studio: Foel Studios, Llanfair Caereinion, Powys
- Genre: Post-punk
- Label: Rough Trade
- Producer: Hugh Jones, Lora Logic

Essential Logic chronology
Beat Rhythm News (1979)	Fanfare in the Garden (2003)

Beat Rhythm News is the debut studio album by English post-punk band Essential Logic, released in December 1979 by record label Rough Trade. It reached number 11 in the UK Indie chart.

== Critical reception ==
AllMusic called it "a stunning record that remains a benchmark of the punk era".

PopMatters ranked it as 34th in their "The 50 Best Post-Punk Albums Ever" list published in 2017 and republished in 2020.

== Track listing ==
All tracks composed by Lora Logic and arranged by Essential Logic

Side A

1. "Quality Crayon Wax OK"
2. "The Order Form"
3. "Shabby Abbott"
4. "World Friction"

Side B

1. "Wake Up"
2. "Albert"
3. "Alkaline Loaf in the Area"
4. "Collecting Dust"
5. "Popcorn Boy (Waddle Ya Do?)"

== Personnel ==
Essential Logic

- Lora Logic - soprano saxophone, tenor saxophone, lead vocals
- Ashley Buff (Philip Legg) - guitar, backing vocals
- Mark Turner - bass, backing vocals
- Dave Flash (Dave Wright) - tenor saxophone, cowbell, backing vocals
- Rich Tea (Rich Thompson) - drums
