= Statue of Winston Churchill (Toronto) =

Statue by Oscar Nemon in Toronto, Canada

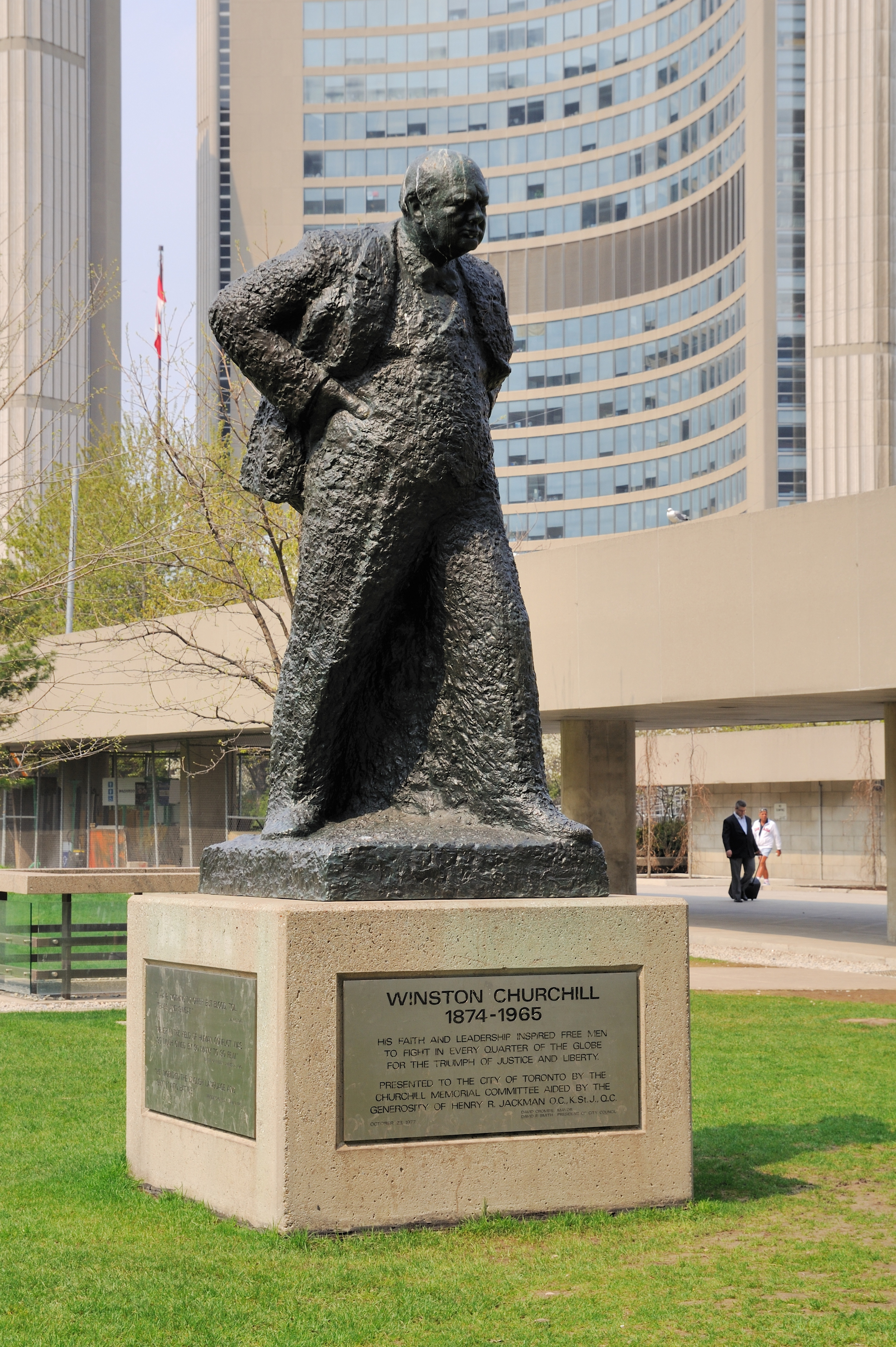
- The statue in 2009
- Subject: Winston Churchill
- Location: Toronto, Ontario, Canada; 43°39′13.3″N 79°23′6.3″W

A statue of Winston Churchill by Oscar Nemon is installed in Toronto, Ontario, Canada.

== See also ==
- Statue of Winston Churchill (Halifax)
