= Classix Nouveaux =

English new wave band

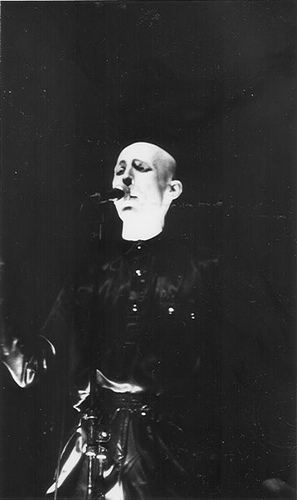
- Sal Solo, onstage with Classix Nouveaux at The Lyceum Theatre in London, supporting XTC (1980).

Background information
- Origin: London, England
- Genre: New wave
- Years active: 1979–1985, 2021-
- Labels: EMI; Cherry Red Records; ESP Records; Liberty Records; Parlophone Records
- Members: Sal Solo; Mik Sweeney; B. P. Hurding; Gary Steadman
- Past members: Jak Airport; Jimi Sumen; Rick Driscoll; Andy Qunta; Paul Turley; Pandit Dinesh; S Paul Wilson

Classix Nouveaux is an English new wave band. During a six-year career between 1979 and 1985 they released three albums and eleven singles, the most commercially successful of which was the single "Is It A Dream" that reached No.11 in the UK Singles Chart.

The band were successful in several other international territories including Portugal, Finland, Australia, Israel, Poland and Iceland.

== Formation ==
The break-up of X-Ray Spex directly precipitated Classix Nouveaux's inception, when ex-X-Ray Spex members Jak Airport (guitar) and B.P. Hurding (drums) placed an advertisement in Melody Maker, searching for a new lead singer. Sal Solo (formerly with The News) answered the advertisement, and the three musicians then joined with bassist Mik Sweeney to form Classix Nouveaux. Their first gig was on 25 August 1979 at London's Music Machine (which would later become the Camden Palace and is now called KOKO). With publicity growing for the band, their dramatic and heavily made-up image led to the music press associating them with the burgeoning New Romantic movement. Jak Airport was replaced by Gary Steadman during the same year.

In 1980, the band recorded a four track session for Capital Radio and one track, "Robot's Dance", was played regularly by DJ Nicky Horne. This attracted the interest of the United Artists record company (then part of the EMI group), but as negotiations dragged on, the band decided to release the track as their debut single on their own ESP label. They also performed for the first time on television on Thames TV in London. "Robot's Dance" spent eleven weeks on the UK Indie Chart, reaching No. 22, and became a popular alternative dance floor track. The group's second single, "Nasty Little Green Men", followed on 10 November 1980.

== Career ==
In 1981, the first Classix Nouveaux album Night People was released along with two moderately successful singles "Guilty" and "Tokyo". Both singles reached the UK Top 75, and "Guilty" reached the Top 20 in Sweden and No. 25 in Australia. The album itself peaked at No. 66 in the UK. The group filmed a colourful music video for "Guilty"; directed by Russell Mulcahy, that caught the attention, and received airplay on MTV in America.

The second Classix Nouveaux album La Verité was released in 1982 and the single release "Is It A Dream" brought the group its only British Top 20 hit, peaking at No. 11. Even though they were not part of the 'Blitz Kids' scene the band were often seen as a New Romantic act due to their stark image.

Their next single, "Because You're Young", peaked at No. 43 in the UK, while the album itself reached No. 44. The album rose to No. 1 in Portugal, and the group toured Asia and India. After the tour supporting La Verité, Classix Nouveaux hired Finnish guitarist Jimi Sumen to replace Gary Steadman. Sumen had been a member of the support act at their Helsinki gig.

The third and final Classix Nouveaux album, Secret, was released in 1983, produced by Alex Sadkin. Several weeks into the recording, their A&R from their record company came to the studio and announced that the band had already spent their entire budget, and the recording was not completed. Anne Dudley arranged an orchestra for the single "Forever and a Day". The record company did not promote the album, and immediately fired the band from their contract. The album, and its singles, were unsuccessful in the UK, but the band had No. 1 hit singles in Poland with "Never Never Comes" and "Heart from the Start". The band toured and played to 25,000 people in Helsinki, but by now Solo was the only original member remaining after Jimi Sumen was replaced by Rick Driscoll and BP Hurding was replaced by Paul Turley.

=== Break-up ===
Classix Nouveaux broke up in 1985, by which time Sal Solo had already begun a solo career. He had a UK hit with "San Damiano" which reached No. 15 in early 1985. He released an album, Heart and Soul, the same year, and further singles, "Music and You" (No. 52) and "Forever Be", but none of these were particularly successful. He went on to record and perform with the French space-rock and electronic band Rockets, before becoming heavily involved in Catholicism and releasing several Christian-oriented albums.

Mik Sweeney moved to Los Angeles where he built fretless bass guitars and did studio session work; he currently lives in Ireland. Gary Steadman went on to join A Flock of Seagulls for their 1986 Dream Come True tour. Jimi Sumen became a record producer in Finland and released a number of solo works there.

The first Classix Nouveaux compilation album was released in 1997 via EMI Records and was reissued with a slightly different track listing in 2003. Beginning that same year, the band's original albums saw reissue on CD by Cherry Red Records. In 2005 River Records released The River Sessions, a live album recorded at Strathclyde University in 1982 and, in February 2021, all the band's singles and associated B-sides saw release as The Liberty Singles Collection, again via Cherry Red Records.

=== Reformation ===
In May 2021, the band - reunited their classic lineup of Sal Solo, BP Hurding, Mik Sweeney, and Gary Steadman - surprised fans with a new single, which was a remake of "Inside Outside" from their first album. On 29 May 2022, their single "Fix Your Eyes Up" charted at No. 10 on The Heritage Chart (as broadcast with Mike Read on Talking Pictures TV). On 17 November 2023, the group released their first studio album in 40 years (42 years for the classic Solo, Hurding, Sweeney, and Steadman incarnation), Battle Cry.

== Discography ==
=== Albums ===
==== Studio albums ====
Title	Album details	Peak chart positions					
Title	Album details	UK	AUS	FIN	ICE	POR	SWE
Night People	Released: 11 May 1981; Label: Liberty; Formats: LP, MC	66	85	18	—	—	11
La Verité	Released: 5 April 1982; Label: Liberty; Formats: LP, MC	44	—	6	3	1	17
Secret	Released: 14 November 1983; Label: Liberty; Formats: LP, MC	—	—	—	—	—	—
Battle Cry	Released: 17 November 2023; Label: Cherry Red; Formats: LP, CD, digital download	—	—	—	—	—	—
"—" denotes releases that did not chart or were not released in that territory.

==== Live albums ====
Title	Album details
The River Sessions	Released: 2005; Label: River; Formats: CD

==== Compilation albums ====
Title	Album details
Singles	Released: 1982; Label: Liberty; Formats: LP; Japan-only release
The Very Best of Classix Nouveaux	Released: September 1997; Label: EMI; Formats: CD
The Very Best of Classix Nouveaux	Released: December 2003; Label: EMI; Formats: CD; Different from 1997 compilation
The Liberty Singles Collection	Released: 18 January 2010; Label: Cherry Red; Formats: CD
The Liberty Recordings 1981–83	Released: 26 February 2021; Label: Cherry Red; Formats: CD, digital download

=== Singles ===
Title	Year	Peak chart positions										Album
Title	Year	UK	UK Indie	AUS	FIN	ICE	IRE	POR	SPA	SWE	US Dance	Album
"The Robots Dance"	1980	—	22	—	—	—	—	—	—	—	—	Non-album singles
"Nasty Little Green Men"	1980	—	—	—	—	—	—	—	—	—	—	Non-album singles
"Guilty"	1981	43	—	25	—	—	—	17	—	—	66	Night People
"Tokyo"	1981	67	—	—	—	—	—	—	—	—	—	Night People
"Inside Outside"	1981	45	—	—	—	—	—	—	—	—	—	Night People
"Run Away" (France-only release)	1981	—	—	—	—	—	—	—	—	—	—	Night People
"Never Again (The Days Time Erased)"	1981	44	—	—	13	—	—	1	13	19	—	La Verité
"Is It a Dream"	1982	11	—	—	11	3	29	9	—	—	—	La Verité
"Because You're Young"	1982	43	—	—	—	—	—	—	—	—	—	La Verité
"The End... Or the Beginning?"	1982	60	—	—	25	—	—	—	—	—	—	Non-album single
"Forever and a Day"	1983	—	—	—	26	—	—	—	—	—	—	Secret
"Never Never Comes"	1983	—	—	—	—	—	—	—	—	—	—	Secret
"Heartbeat" (credited as Sal Solo with Classix Nouveaux)	1985	—	—	—	—	—	—	—	—	—	—	Heart & Soul (by Solo)
"Inside Outside 2021"	2021	—	—	—	—	—	—	—	—	—	—	Non-album single
"Fix Your Eyes Up"	2022	—	—	—	—	—	—	—	—	—	—	Battle Cry
"Battle Cry" (Single Edit)	2024	—	—	—	—	—	—	—	—	—	—	Battle Cry
"—" denotes releases that did not chart or were not released in that territory.

== See also ==
- List of Liberty Records artists
- List of new wave artists
- O.T.T.
