= Oscar Nemon =

Croatian sculptor

- Born: Oscar Neumann; 13 March 1906; Osijek, Kingdom of Croatia-Slavonia, Austria-Hungary
- Died: 13 April 1985 (aged 79); Oxford, England, United Kingdom
- Known for: Sculpture

Oscar Nemon (born Oscar Neumann; 13 March 1906 – 13 April 1985) was a Croatian sculptor who was born in Osijek, Croatia, but eventually settled in England. He is best known for his series of more than a dozen public statues of Sir Winston Churchill.

== Biography ==
Nemon was born into a close Jewish family in Osijek. He was the second child, and elder son, of Eugenia Adler and Mavro Neumann, a pharmaceutical manufacturer. He was an accomplished artist from an early age and began modelling with clay at a local brickworks. He exhibited early works locally in 1923 and 1924, while still at school. He obtained his baccalaureate in Osijek. He was encouraged by Ivan Meštrović to study in Paris, but he moved to Vienna instead. He applied to join the Akademie der bildenden Künste but failed to secure a place, and spent some time working at his uncle's bronze foundry in Vienna. There he met Sigmund Freud and made a sculpture of Freud's dog Topsy. He also made a sculpture of Princess Marie Bonaparte. Later in his life, Nemon changed his surname from Neumann.

After a short period studying in Paris, Nemon moved to Brussels in 1925 to study at the Académie Royale des Beaux-Arts, where he won a gold medal for his sculpture. Brussels became his home until 1939; he shared a house there with the painter René Magritte for much of the 1930s. He made the monument "June Victims" for his home city of Osijek in 1928, commemorating the murders of Pavle Radić, Đuro Basariček, and Stjepan Radić in Belgrade in 1928; all three were Croatian members of the Yugoslav Parliament who were fatally shot in the debating chamber by a Montenegrin Serb, Puniša Račić. Nemon returned to Vienna in 1931, to create a large seated sculpture of Freud, now in Hampstead. He staged a one-man exhibition of portrait heads at the Académie, including his Freud and a bust of Paul-Henri Spaak. He made portraits of King Albert I, Queen Astrid of the Belgians, Emile Vandervelde and August Vermeylen, and also exhibited at the Galerie Monteau in December 1934 and January 1939.

Concerned by the approaching threat of Nazi Germany, he escaped to England in 1938, a year before the outbreak of World War II. He abandoned over a decade of work in progress in his studio, including a 20-foot (6 m) clay model, "Le Pont". Most of his family remained in Europe and were murdered in the Holocaust.

Nemon married Patricia Villiers-Stuart, daughter of Lieutenant-Colonel Patrick Villiers-Stuart and author Constance Villiers-Stuart, in 1939 and they lived firstly in Holywell Street in Oxford, and then Sandfield Road in Headington, before settling in Boars Hill. They had a son, Falcon and two daughters, Aurelia and Electra. Falcon had a varied career, first as a photographer, then as a film maker, and finally as a music promoter. Aurelia married the Conservative MP Sir George Young, and Electra married rock musician Phil May.

Nemon made a bust of Max Beerbohm in 1941 (now at Merton College, Oxford); Beerbohm taught him English. The growing family moved to Boars Hill, near Oxford, in 1941, first living in rented rooms, and then Nissen huts on land bought from Robert Graves which he named "Pleasant Land", after the words of the hymn Jerusalem. He designed and built a combined house and studio on the site in the 1960s. He exhibited some portraits at Regent's Park College in Oxford in 1942, and made portraits of John Rothenstein, director of the Tate Gallery, and Sir Karl Parker of the Ashmolean Museum. He became a naturalised British subject in 1948.

After the war, Nemon made sculptures of a number of high-profile figures. He made portraits of the members of British royal family, including Elizabeth II, the Duke of Edinburgh, the Queen Mother, and the Earl Mountbatten of Burma, at a studio in St James's Palace. He also sculpted war leaders such as Dwight D. Eisenhower, Earl Alexander of Tunis, Viscount Montgomery of Alamein, Lord Freyberg, Lord Portal of Hungerford, Lord Beaverbrook, and other political figures including Harold Macmillan, Harry S. Truman and Margaret Thatcher. He is best known for his series of more than a dozen public statues of Winston Churchill, including examples in the House of Commons and the Guildhall, at Westerham (near Churchill's home at Chartwell), and in Nathan Phillips Square in Toronto. His last major piece, a monumental memorial to the Royal Canadian Air Force in Toronto, was unveiled by Queen Elizabeth II in 1984. Meanwhile, in the 1940s and 1950s, he also created a series of lesser-known relief works, which he called "Les Fleurs de mon Coeur" (The Flowers of my Heart).

He was made an Honorary Doctor of Letters at the University of St Andrews in 1977, and a retrospective was held at the Ashmolean Museum in 1982. He was honoured by the tenth Slavonian Biennal. He died on 13 April 1985 at the John Radcliffe Hospital in Oxford. The same year, a memorial exhibition was held at the Galerija Likovnih Umjetnosti in Osijek.

== Technique and legacy ==
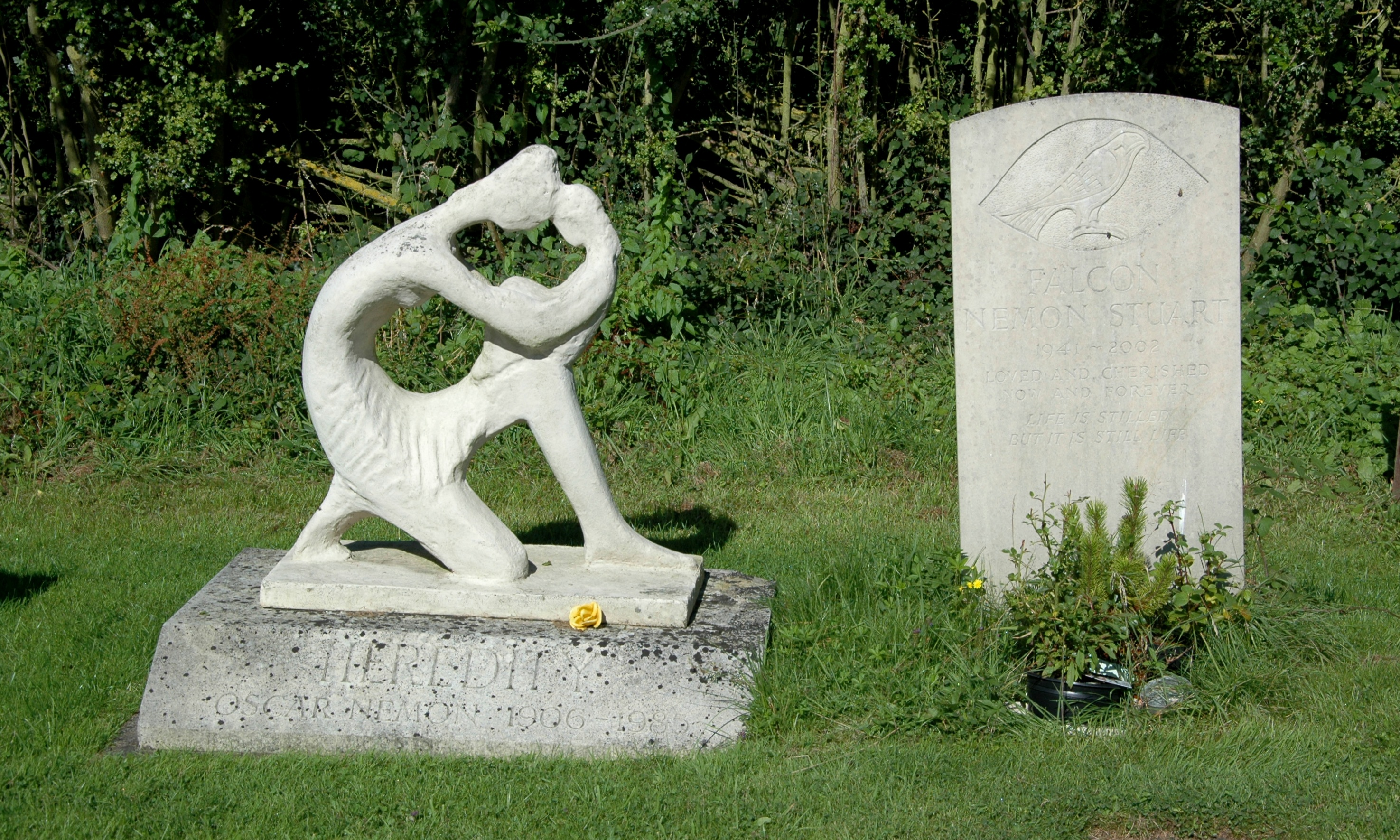
Graves of Oscar Nemon (left) and his son Falcon Stuart (right) at Wootton, Vale of White Horse, Oxfordshire

Nemon's technique depended on modelling from life directly in clay, quickly making many small studies with no preliminary drawings. He produced works in clay (often fired into terracotta), plaster, and stone, but most of his finished works were cast bronze, often at the Morris Singer art foundry or occasionally at the Burleighfield art foundry (now merged).

His house and studio, Pleasant Land, remained closed for 17 years after his death. It reopened in 2003 as a museum of his life's work, exhibiting many studies and models for his finished works. It also houses the archive of his papers. Other papers, relating to his sculptures of Winston Churchill and Margaret Thatcher, are held by the Churchill Archives Centre in Cambridge.

== Gallery ==
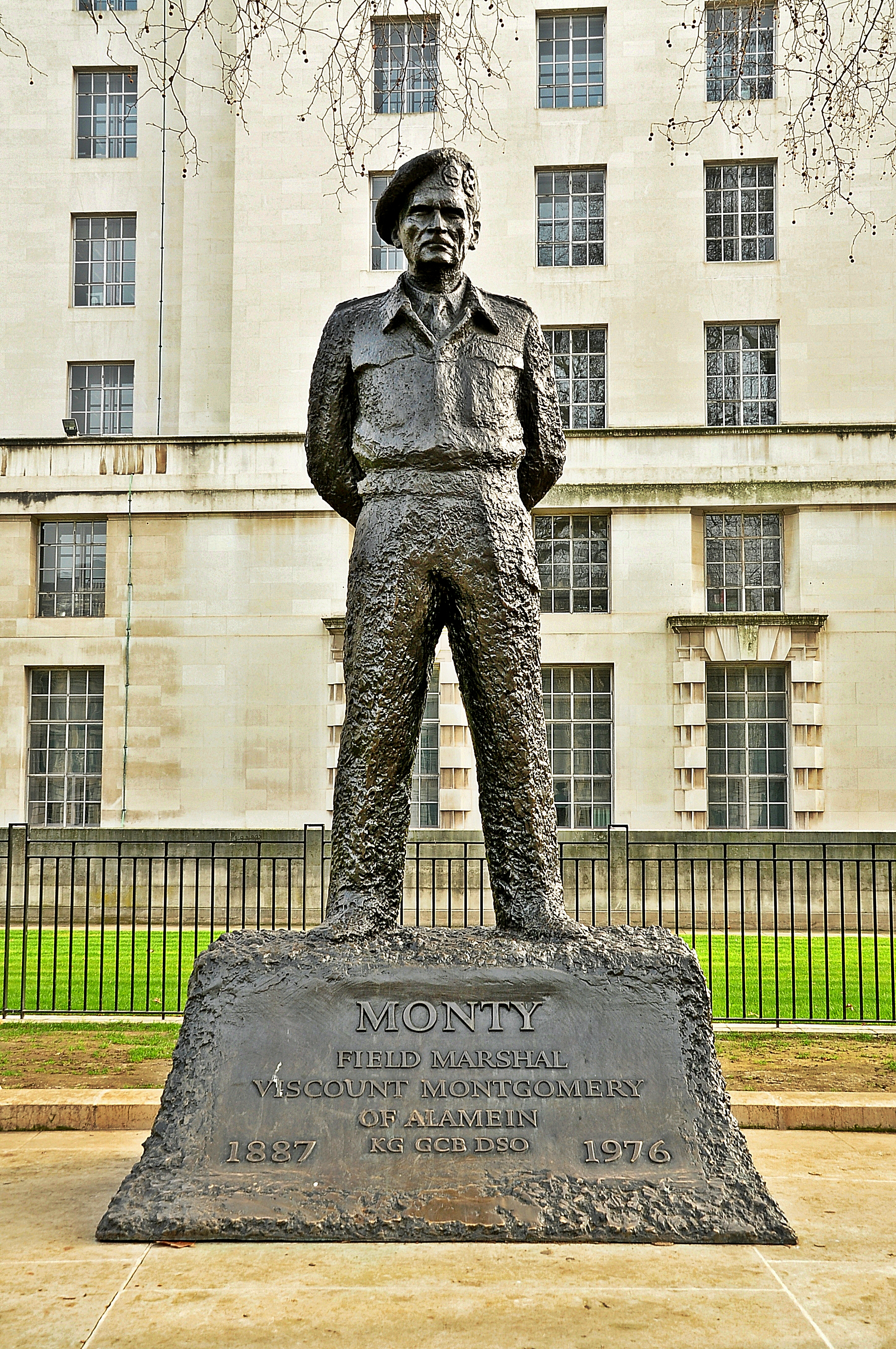
Oscar Nemon's Montgomery in Whitehall, London

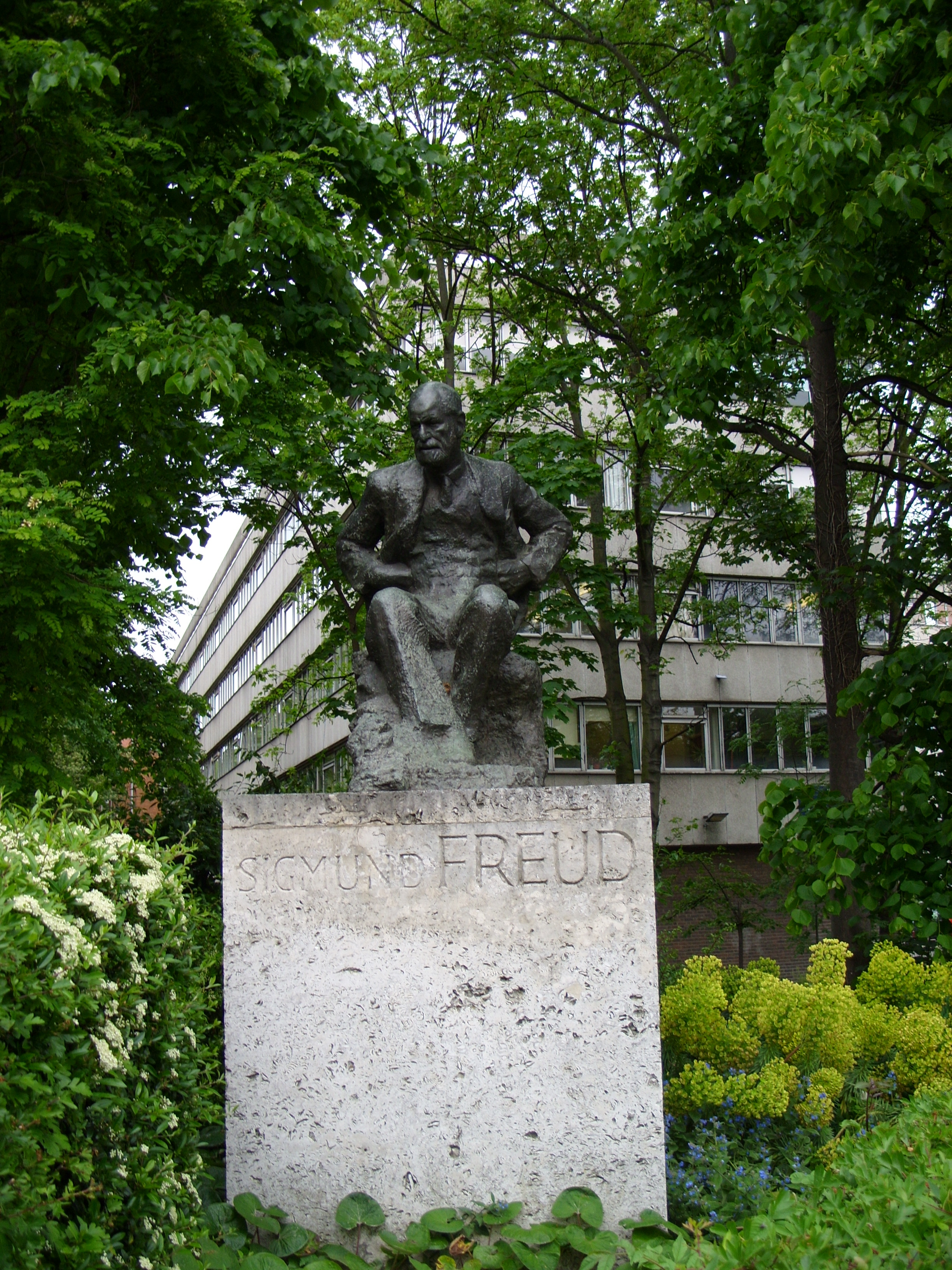
Statue of Sigmund Freud, Hampstead

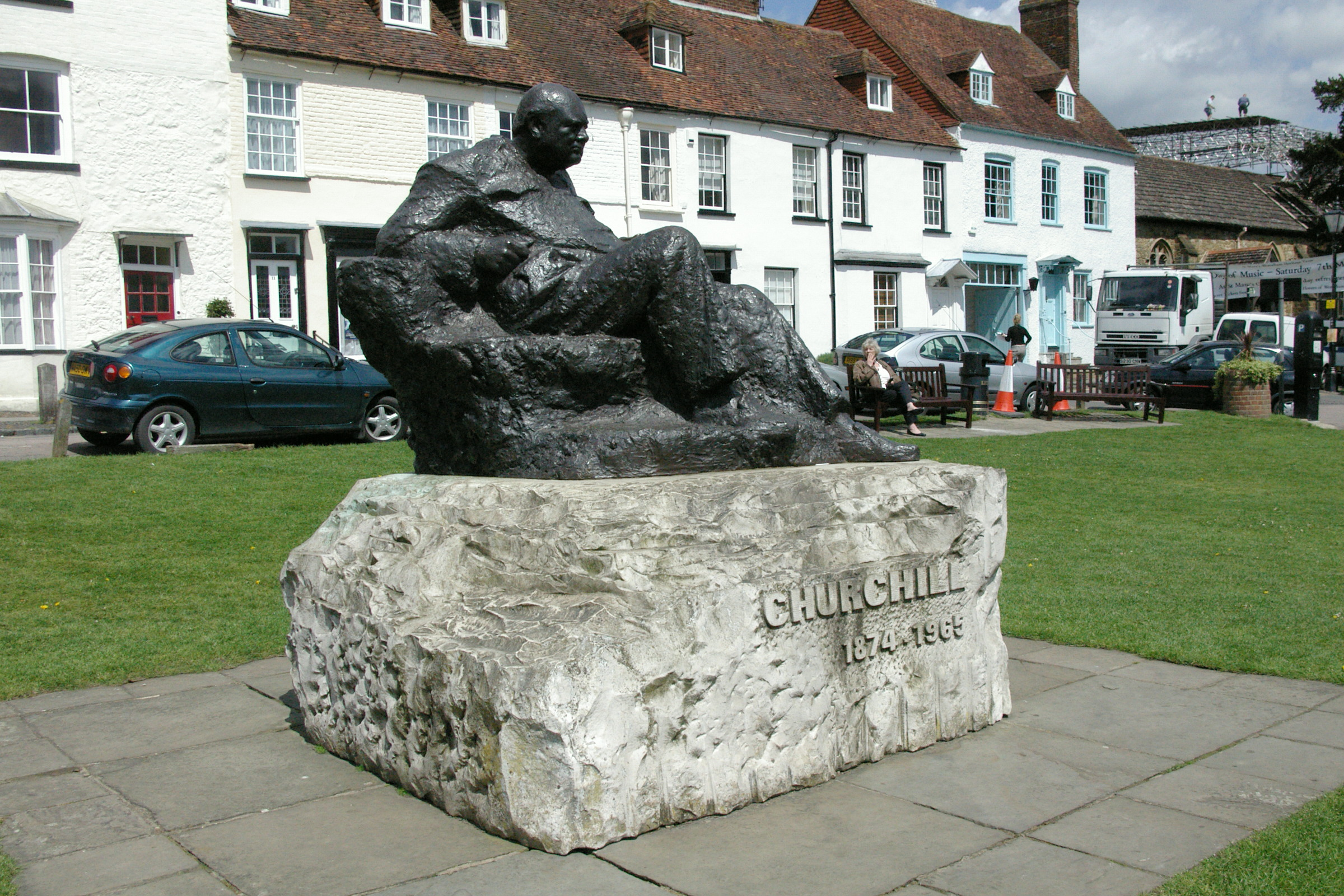
Oscar Nemon's Statue of Sir Winston Churchill at Westerham, erected in 1969 on a stone plinth donated by Marshal Tito of Yugoslavia

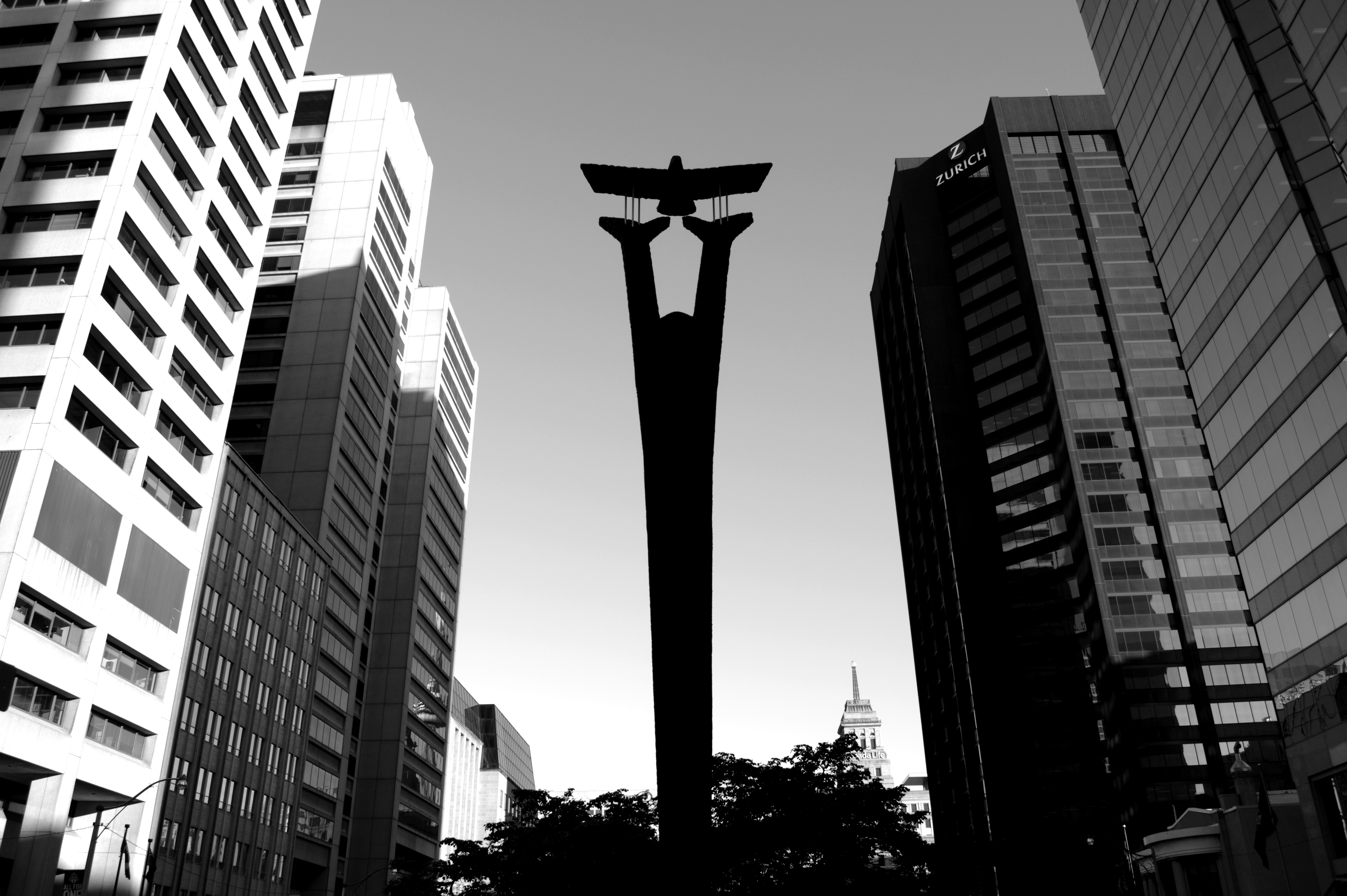
Per Ardua Ad Astra, Oscar Nemon's 1984 memorial sculpture on University Avenue in Toronto Canada honouring fallen Canadian airmen and women of the RCAF

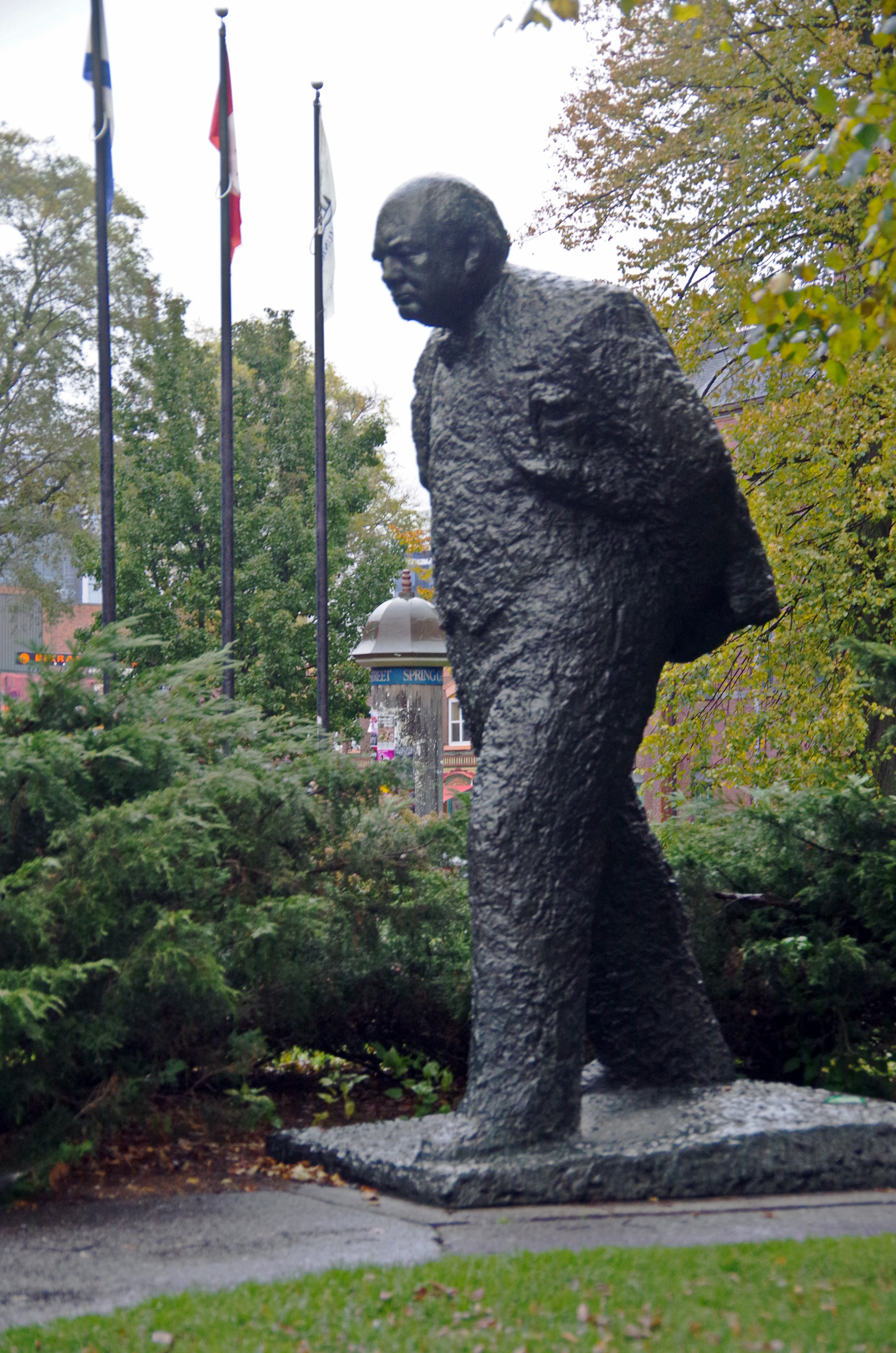
Sir Winston Churchill, Halifax, Nova Scotia

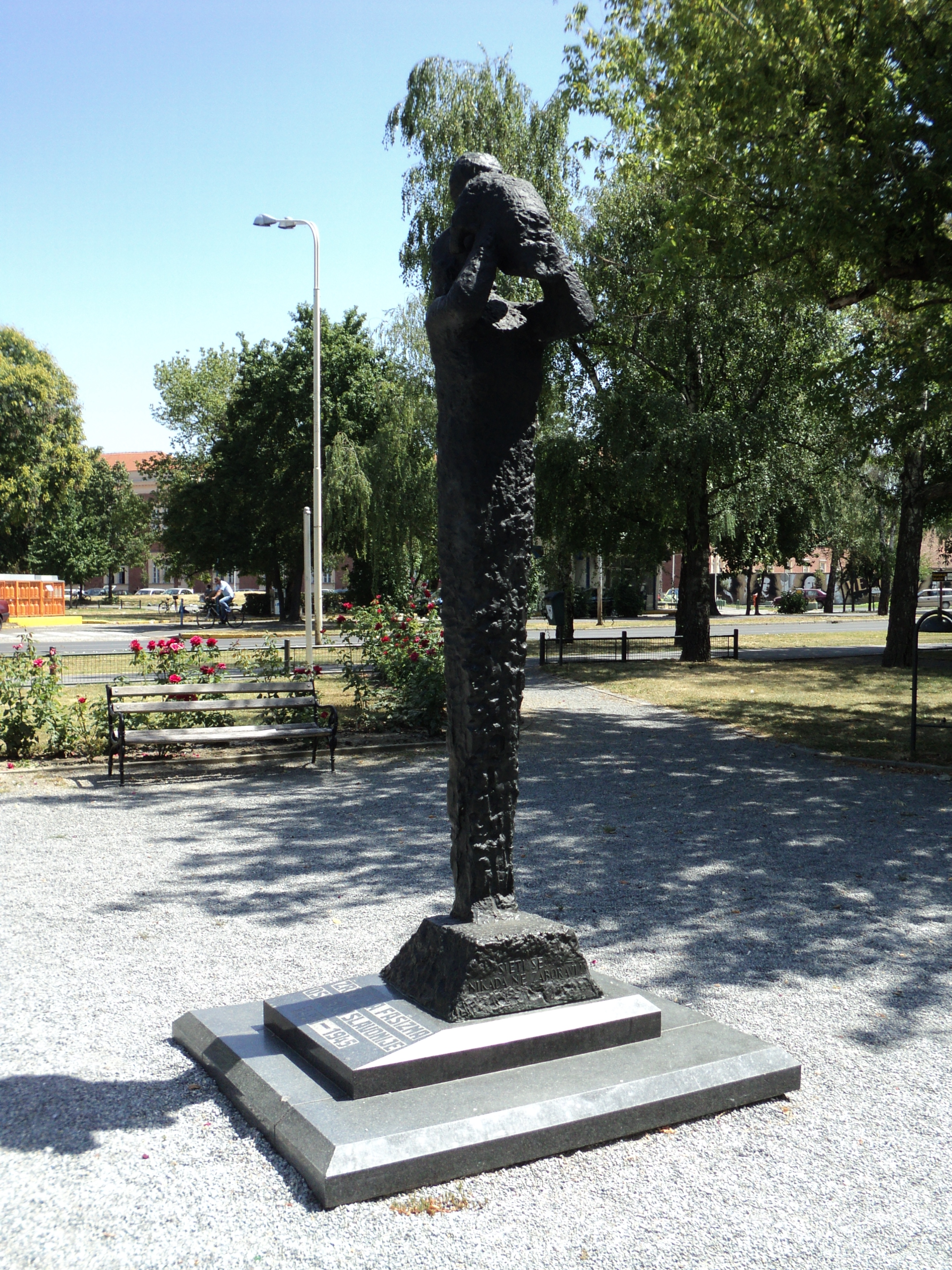
″Mother with the child″ monument dedicated to the victims of fascism, Osijek, Croatia
