= Trance Dance =

- Origin: Sweden
- Genres: Pop, rock, new wave
- Years active: 1985–1991

Trance Dance was a Swedish pop group who had a number of hits in the late 1980s. The group were somewhat rock-influenced, with their music being driven by guitars and other instruments not fully characteristic of a late 1980s pop group. Despite their name, their music did not resemble trance at all.

== History ==
Trance Dance were formed in Sweden in 1985 as a seven-piece group consisting of Ben Marlene (vocals), Pelle Hökengren (guitar) (1962-2023), P.J. Widestrand (keyboards), John Stark (bass), Sören Johansson (drums) and the sisters Susanne and Yvonne Holmström (additional vocals). Ben Marlene had previously been in the Finnish group French Kiss, which existed between 1982 and 1984 and made two albums. Marlene and the Holmström sisters are Swedish-speaking Finns.

The group's first album, A-Ho-Ho, was released in Sweden in late 1986 and in the U.S. in February 1987, peaking at number 19 on the Swedish Albums Chart. The albums spawned the two singles, "Do the Dance" and "Hoodoo Wanna Voodoo", and despite receiving a fair amount of airplay in clubs, they failed to chart in their native Sweden. However, "Hoodoo Wanna Voodoo" was a popular hit in Poland.

Despite this, their first hit came in October of that year, with "Don't Say Go" making number 2 on the singles chart. The follow-up single, "You're Gonna Get It", also reached number 2 in early 1988. "You're Gonna Get It" would prove to be their most successful single.

Their second album, Dancing in the Shadows charted in March 1988, reaching number 4. Their third single "Joy Toy" would only reach number 13 on the singles chart however, and the quickly-released (November 1988) remix-album Off the Record would flop by only reaching number 27. Their final charting single, "Push", reached number 15 in May 1989.

With their popularity declining, Trance Dance fell out of the spotlight, charting for the final time with a greatest hits album, Greatest Hits Vol. 1. The album, released in February 1990, peaked at a lowly number 50 on the album chart. As a trio, they released one final album Twang on CBS, produced by Nick Tesco and Mark Smith.

== Discography ==
=== Albums ===
- A Ho Ho (LP/CD, 1986)
- A Ho Ho (American version with different artwork, LP, 1987)
- Dancing in the Shadows (LP/CD, 1988)
- Off the Record - The Remix Album (LP/CD, 1988)
- Greatest Hits Volume 1 (LP/CD, 1990)
- Twang (LP/CD, 1990)

=== Singles ===
- "Come Play with Me" (7"/12", 1985)
- "Don't Walk Away" (7"/12", 1986)
- "Do the Dance" (7"/12", 1986)
- "Hoodoo Wanna Voodoo" (7"/12", 1986)
- "River of Love" (7"/12", 1987)
- "Don't Say Go" (7"/12", 1987)
- "You're Gonna Get It" (7"/12", 1988)
- "Joy Toy" (7"/12", 1988)
- "Dancing in the Shadows" (7"/12", 1988)
- "Push" (7"/12"/CD5, 1989)
- "High Tide of Love" (7"/12"/CD3, 1989)
- "Wildlife" (7"/12"/CD3, 1990)
- "Is It Love" (7"/12"/CD5, 1990)
- "Another Perfect Day" (7"/12"/CD5, 1990)
- "A Glass of Champagne" (7"/12"/CD5, 1990)
- "Do You Close Your Eyes" (7"/12"/CD5, 1991)
- "Do the Trance" (CD5)
