= Statue of Winston Churchill (Halifax) =

Bronze sculpture in Nova Scotia, Canada

Sir Winston Churchill
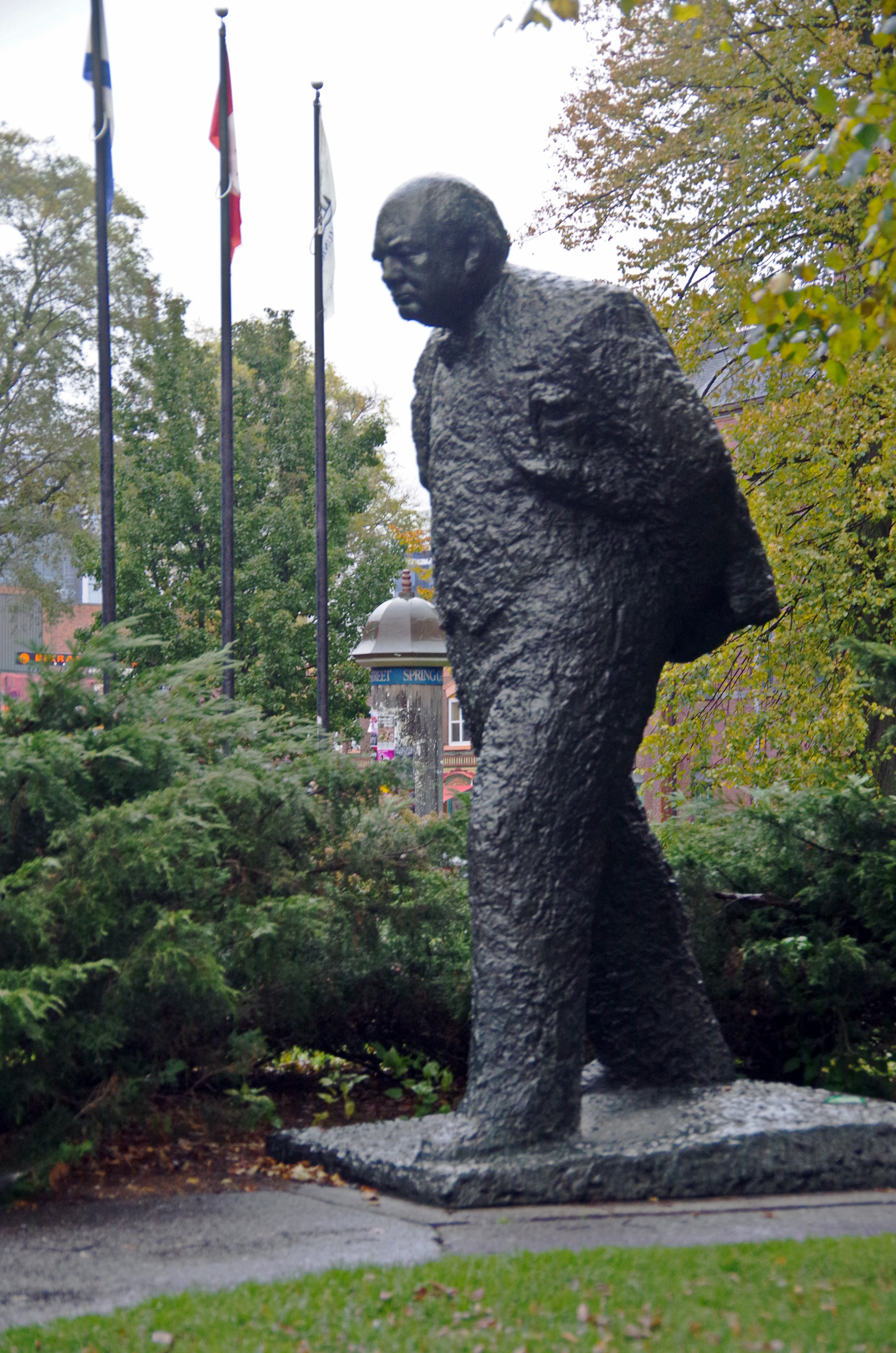
- The statue in 2015
- Artist: Oscar Nemon
- Year: 1980; 46 years ago
- Type: Bronze sculpture
- Subject: Winston Churchill
- Weight: 1.5 t (3,300 lb)
- Location: Spring Garden Road; Halifax, Nova Scotia, Canada; 44.643949°N 63.574403°W

Sir Winston Churchill is a bronze sculpture located in Halifax, Nova Scotia, depicting the British prime minister Winston Churchill. The sculpture was created by Oscar Nemon and unveiled in 1980 in front of the Halifax Memorial Library on Spring Garden Road.

== History ==
The creation of the statue of Winston Churchill was announced in 1979 and financed via fundraising efforts by Leonard Kitz, a former mayor of Halifax. It was reported at the time that the statue was to be over eight feet tall and cost CAD$60,000. (Note: (equivalent to $246,000 in 2025)) The statue was sculpted by Oscar Nemon, and unveiled on 20 January 1980 in Grafton Park in front of the Halifax Memorial Library.

The statue has been described as controversial. In the summer of 2020, a demonstration was held around the statue calling for its removal, coming two years after the removal of the statue of Edward Cornwallis from an urban square in the south end of Halifax.

== Description ==
The statue depicts Winston Churchill with his hands behind his back and stepping forward with his left foot, wearing a formal suit with a bow tie. The statue weighs 1.5 metric tons (3,300 lb) and stands 10 feet (3.0 m) in height.

== See also ==
- Statue of Winston Churchill (Toronto)
