= Sal Solo =

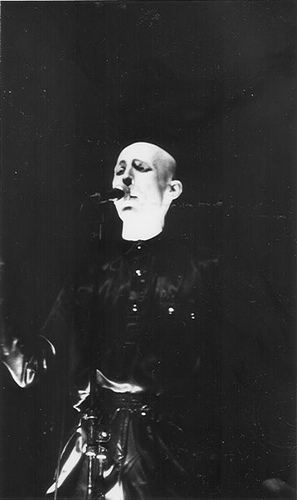
- Sal Solo on stage with Classix Nouveaux at the Lyceum Theatre, London. 12 October 1980

Background information
- Born: Christopher Scott Stevens; Hatfield, Hertfordshire, United Kingdom
- Origin: London, England
- Genres: New wave, post-punk
- Instruments: Vocals, guitar, piano, synthesizer
- Years active: 1978–present
- Website: web.archive.org/web/20250720083756/https://www.salsolo.com/

Sal Solo (born Christopher Scott Stevens) is an English singer.

== Career ==
Solo began his career with a band called The News, which released one 7" single on GTO Records. He was then in a band called Scorpio, two other members of which went on to form the goth band Alien Sex Fiend. Then he formed the pop group Classix Nouveaux, with former members of X-Ray Spex, which became associated with the burgeoning New Romantic movement. They released three albums with EMI Records. Classix Nouveaux had number one hits in Poland, Portugal, Israel, Iceland and other countries in the early 1980s. They also had one top 20 and various other top 50 hits in the United Kingdom, including "Is It a Dream", which reached No. 11 on the UK Singles Chart. The band split in 1985. Between 1984 and 1992, he provided lead vocals for the French space rock group Rockets.

Following a pilgrimage to San Damiano in Italy, Solo embraced the Roman Catholic faith of his childhood. He had a solo hit with "San Damiano (Heart and Soul)" which reached No. 15 on the UK Singles Chart, and went to No. 1 in Poland. The song has since been recorded by several artists, including Aled Jones for his 2003 album Higher, which remained on the UK Albums Chart top 40 for several weeks, and earned a silver disc.

In 1987, Solo became active in youth ministry in the Catholic Church in the UK. During this time, he continued to write and perform new music. In the early 1990s, he released three albums of Christian music through the Christian record label, Word Records, followed by several more released independently. In 1999, he moved to Chicago, where he works with Catholic teenagers in the United States and other parts of the world, speaking on matters of faith and justice, and giving concerts and youth retreats.

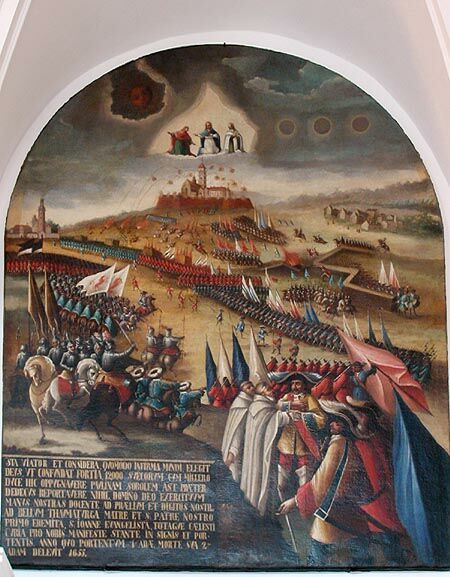
A detail of this painting (in Jasna Góra Monastery, Częstochowa, Poland) was used for the cover art of Heart and Soul

== Discography ==
Albums

- 1981: Classix Nouveaux: Night People (Liberty/EMI)
- 1982: Classix Nouveaux: La Verité (Liberty/EMI)
- 1983: Classix Nouveaux: Secret (Liberty/EMI)
- 1983: Hazan (Nazia Hassan) Dreamer Devane (EMI) (as producer)
- 1983: Hazan (Nazia Hassan) Destiny (EMI) (as producer)
- 1983: Hazan (Nazia Hassan) Get a little closer (remix producer)
- 1984: Rockets: Imperception (CGD)
- 1985: Sal Solo: Heart & Soul (MCA)
- 1985: Roketz: One Way (CGD)
- 1991: Sal Solo: Look at Christ (Word UK)
- 1992: Rockets: Another Future (Polydor)
- 1994: Sal Solo: Through Ancient Eyes (Word UK)
- 1996: Sal Solo: Born to Die ( (Word UK)
- 1997: Classix Nouveaux: The Very Best of Classix Nouveaux (EMI UK)
- 1998: Sal Solo: Live! (ACTS)
- 1999: Sal Solo: Anno Domini (ACTS)
- 1999: Sal Solo: Pilgrimage – The Gospel Best of Sal Solo (ACTS)
- 2001: Sal Solo: I Worship (ACTS)
- 2001: Sal Solo: Anno Domini (Espańol) (De La Raiz)
- 2003: Sal Solo: NeoSacro (Espańol) (De La Raiz)
- 2005: Sal Solo: Yes! Best of Studio and Live (ACTS)
- 2005: Sal Solo: Teen Mass for the Millennium (ACTS)
- 2009: Sal Solo: We Cry Justice! (Heart Beat)
- 2012: Mathias Michael: I Believe (The Buzz) (as producer)
- 2012: Various Artists: NCYC'S Top Talent Volume One (The Buzz) (as producer)
- 2013: Fusion: "Undiscovered" (The Buzz) (as producer)
- 2013: Sal Solo: Acts of Worship (Heart Beat)
- 2020: SIJ10 (The Buzz) (as writer and producer)
- 2021: Classix Nouveaux: "Inside Outside 2021" (ESP) (single)
- 2022: Classix Nouveaux: "Fix your eyes up" (single)
