= X-Ray Spex =

English punk rock band

Background information
- Origin: London, England
- Genres: Punk rock; new wave
- Years active: 1976–1979; 1991; 1995–1996; 2008
- Labels: Virgin; EMI International; Receiver; Universal; Future Noise
- Spinoffs: Classix Nouveaux Essential Logic
- Past members: Poly Styrene; Lora Logic; Jak Airport; Paul Dean; Rudi Thompson; BP Hurding; Red Spectre; Pauli OhAirt; Mark Saxby; Sid Truelove; Dave Flash Wright
- Website: x-rayspex.com

X-Ray Spex were an English punk rock band formed in 1976 in London. They were led by Poly Styrene, who formed the band after watching the Sex Pistols live. Styrene was one of the most distinctive personalities in the British punk movement, because of her singing style and atypical and unorthodox appearance, taking influences from reggae as well as punk. Her lyrics primarily dealt with anti-consumerism and anti-capitalism, and were an influence on the 1990s riot grrrl movement. The line-up also included saxophone, which was little used by other punk bands.

During their first incarnation (1976–1979), X-Ray Spex released five singles and one album. Their 1977 single "Oh Bondage Up Yours!" and 1978 debut album Germfree Adolescents are widely acclaimed as classic punk releases. The band briefly reformed several times in the 1990s and 2000s.

== Career ==
Initially, the band featured singer Poly Styrene (born Marion Joan Elliott-Said, alternatively spelled Marian or Marianne) on vocals, Jak Airport (Jack Stafford) on guitars, Paul Dean on bass, Paul 'B. P.' Hurding on drums, and Lora Logic (born Susan Whitby) on saxophone. This last instrument was an atypical addition to the standard punk instrumental line-up, and became one of the group's most distinctive features.

X-Ray Spex's other distinctive musical element was Poly Styrene's voice, which has been variously described as "effervescently discordant" and "powerful enough to drill holes through sheet metal". As Mari Elliot, Styrene had released a reggae single for GTO Records in 1976, "Silly Billy", which had not charted. Born in 1957 in Bromley, Kent, to a Somali father and a British mother, Poly Styrene became the group's public face, and remains one of the most memorable front-women to emerge from the punk movement. Unorthodox in appearance, she wore thick braces on her teeth and once stated that "I said that I wasn't a sex symbol and that if anybody tried to make me one I'd shave my head tomorrow". She later actually did at Johnny Rotten's flat prior to a concert at Victoria Park. Mark Paytress recounts in the liner notes for the 2002 compilation, The Anthology, that Jah Wobble, Rotten's longtime friend and bassist for his post-punk venture PiL, once described Styrene as a "strange girl who often talked of hallucinating. She freaked John out." Rotten, known more for his outspoken dislikes and disdain than for praise and admiration, said of X-Ray Spex in a retrospective punk documentary, "Them, they came out with a sound and attitude and a whole energy—it was just not relating to anything around it—superb."

Styrene was inspired to form a band by seeing the Sex Pistols in Hastings and, through their live performances, she and X-Ray Spex became one of the most talked about acts on the infant punk scene. The band played twice at the punk club The Roxy during its first 100 days. In March, the band played with The Drones and Chelsea. In April, they shared the bill with the Buzzcocks, Wire, and Johnny Moped. Their first Roxy gig was only their second live appearance. It was recorded and their anthem "Oh Bondage Up Yours!" was included on the influential Live at the Roxy WC2 album. Styrene was nineteen years old at the time of the recording. The publicity from this gig led to a "near residency", particularly on Sunday nights, at The Man in the Moon pub, King's Road, Chelsea, and record label interest.

In late September 1977, a studio recording of "Oh Bondage Up Yours!" was released as a single. Today, the 45 is regarded as their most enduring artefact, both as a piece of music and as a sort of proto-grrrl catchphrase. Opening with the spoken/screamed line, "Some people think little girls should be seen and not heard but I think—oh, bondage, up yours!", the song could be interpreted as a premonition of the riot grrrl movement 15 years later, although Styrene herself insists it was more intended as an anti-consumerist/anti-capitalist jingle, and was not exclusively feminist in nature.

Just months after the release of that first single, Logic was replaced on saxophone without notice. After a brief hiatus from music, Logic formed Essential Logic the next year. Logic was replaced briefly by John Glyn (who later joined Wreckless Eric's band), who was then replaced by Rudi Thompson (also known as Steve Rudi).

In November 1978, the band released their debut album. With the exception of "Identity", which was partially based on Styrene witnessing Bromley Contingent member Tracie O'Keefe slash her wrists in the restroom of the Roxy, the rest of Germfree Adolescents dealt with the anti consumerist theme. Indeed, The Guardian newspaper described the album as containing "unrivalled anti-consumerism anthems".

X-Ray Spex played at 'Front Row Festival', a three-week event at the Hope and Anchor, Islington in late November and early December 1977. This resulted in the band's inclusion, alongside the likes of Wilko Johnson, 999, The Only Ones, the Saints, The Stranglers, and XTC, on a double album of recordings from the festival. Then, in February 1978, before the release of their second single, X-Ray Spex recorded the first of two sessions for John Peel at BBC Radio 1. Their profile was further enhanced by playing a fortnight's residency at the CBGB club in New York City, even though the album Germfree Adolescents was not released in America until 1992.

On 30 April 1978, the band appeared at the Rock Against Racism gig at Victoria Park, Bow, Tower Hamlets. Also on the bill were Steel Pulse, The Clash, The Ruts, Sham 69, Generation X and Tom Robinson Band. Later in the year, to promote the album, X-Ray Spex embarked on their first, and only, full UK tour. Exhausted by touring, Poly Styrene left the band in mid 1979. Footage of her performing with the band was later included in the 1980 film, DOA. She released a solo album, Translucence, before joining the Hare Krishna movement (as did Logic, after she left the band).

Without Styrene, the group lost its momentum and split up. Hurding and Airport went on to form Classix Nouveaux, while Paul Dean and Rudi Thompson went on to form Agent Orange with Anthony "Tex" Doughty, who would later become a founding member of Transvision Vamp.

The first incarnation of X-Ray Spex existed from mid-1976 to 1979, during which time they released five singles—"Oh Bondage Up Yours!", "Identity", "The Day the World Turned Day-Glo", "Germfree Adolescents", and "Highly Inflammable"—and one album, Germfree Adolescents. One retrospective review described the singles as "not only riveting examples of high-energy punk, but contained provocative, thoughtful lyrics berating the urban synthetic fashions of the 70s and urging individual expression".

The same reviewer in The Virgin Encyclopedia of Popular Music sums up the band's 1970s contribution as "one of the most inventive, original and genuinely exciting groups to emerge during the punk era".

== Reformation ==
In 1988, Poly Styrene, Jak Airport, Mick Sweeney and Lora Logic reformed the band with no drummer. They then decided to bring in Paul Merron who had a sequencer, small studio set up and fx who provided drum loops and played keyboards and co-produced demos with Jak Airport. They rehearsed in Oxted at Poly Styrene's home, writing and arranging and then went into Nomis studios in Olympia, London, prior to a planned trip to India to shoot a video plus a recording session in Florence. During this period, Jak Airport was knocked off his bicycle by a truck on way to the BBC and seriously broke his arm. Then after a period of eight months with the band, Paul Merron was asked to not only play in the band but also be their video director, and then also to manage them. This seemed unrealistic so he left and went to live in Crete, pursuing his other passions of photography and scuba diving. In 1991, X-Ray Spex reformed for a surprise sell-out gig at the Brixton Academy, where Poly Styrene appeared in a blue foam dress with an army helmet (to her regret). The group reformed again in 1995 with Styrene, Dean and Logic joined by Crispian Mills (as 'Red Spectre') and Paul Winterhart (as 'Pauli OhAirt') to release a new album Conscious Consumer. Although heralded as the first in a trilogy, the album was not a commercial success. Styrene later explained that touring and promotional work suffered an abrupt end when she was run over by a fire engine in central London, suffering a fractured pelvis. The following year X-Ray Spex played at the 20th Anniversary of Punk Festival in Blackpool minus Poly Styrene, overcoming her last-minute decision to withdraw by recruiting a replacement female singer named Poly Filla. The band disbanded, but later releases include a compilation of the group's early records, a live album, and an anthology of all the aforementioned.

Jak Airport later worked for the BBC's corporate and public relations department under his real name, Jack Stafford; he died on 13 August 2004 of cancer, at the age of 46.

On 28 April 2008, Poly Styrene gave a performance of "Oh Bondage Up Yours!" at the Love Music Hate Racism free concert in Victoria Park, East London.

The band including original bass player Paul Dean, played what was described as a raucous comeback gig and in front of an audience of 3,000 full at The Roundhouse in London on 6 September 2008. The gig consisted of Germfree Adolescents in its entirety, with the exception of "Plastic Bag". Styrene and Dean were joined by guitarist Mark Saxby, drummer Sid Truelove and saxophonist Dave Flash Wright at the gig. A DVD and CD of the Roundhouse performance was released in November 2009 on the Year Zero Label by Future Noise Music. Symond Lawes, working as Concrete Jungle Productions, with Poly Styrene, produced the live show at Camden Roundhouse in 2008.

Poly Styrene died of spinal and breast cancer on 25 April 2011 in East Sussex, England, at the age of 53.

== Documentary and biography ==
Styrene is the subject of a documentary Poly Styrene: I Am a Cliché. The documentary was directed by Paul Sng, and was co-written by Styrene's daughter, Celeste Bell (who also narrates), and author Zoë Howe. The documentary comes in conjunction with the 40-year anniversary of Germfree Adolescents. Bell said, "This film will be a celebration of the life and work of my mother, an artist who deserves to be recognized as one of the greatest front women of all time; a little girl with a big voice whose words are more relevant than ever". Bell and Howe have co-written a biography about Styrene. The book titled Day Glo: The Poly Styrene Story was released in the United States in September 2019.

== Members ==
- Poly Styrene – lead vocals (1976–1979, 1995–1996, 2008; died 2011)
- Paul Dean – bass (1976–1979, 1995–1996, 2008)
- Jak Airport – guitar (1976–1979; died 2004)
- B.P. Hurding – drums (1976–1979)
- Lora Logic – saxophone (1976–1977, 1995–1996)
- Steve "Rudi" Thompson – saxophone (1977–1979)
- Paul Merron – synth and drum programming (1988)
- Red Spectre – guitar (1995–1996)
- Pauli OhAirt – drums (1995–1996)
- Mark Saxby – guitar (2008)
- Sid Truelove – drums (2008)
- Dave "Flash" Wright – saxophone (2008)

== Discography ==
=== Albums ===
- Germfree Adolescents (November 1978: EMI International, INT 3023) – No. 30 UK Albums Chart, No. 56 AUS
- Conscious Consumer (October 1995: Receiver)

=== Live ===
- Live at the Roxy (March 1991: Receiver, RRCD 140); live recordings from 1977
- Live @ the Roundhouse London 2008 (November 2009: Year Zero, YZCDDVD01); CD and DVD of live recordings from September 2008

=== Compilation ===
- Let's Submerge: The Anthology (2006: Castle Music CMEDD1378); 2 CD Compilation

=== Singles ===
- "Oh Bondage Up Yours!" / "I Am a Cliché" (September 1977: Virgin Records, VS 189); also released as a 12" single (VS 189–12)
- "The Day the World Turned Day-Glo" / "I Am a Poseur" (March 1978: EMI International, INT 553) – No. 23 UK singles chart
- "Identity" / "Let's Submerge" (July 1978: EMI International, INT 563) – No. 24 UK
- "Germfree Adolescence" / "Age" (October 1978: EMI International, INT 573) – No. 19 UK
- "Highly Inflammable" / "Warrior in Woolworths" (April 1979: EMI International, INT 583) – No. 45 UK

=== Appearances on various artist compilations (selective) ===
Listing of those various artist compilation albums mentioned in the text of the main article:

- "Oh Bondage Up Yours!" featured on The Roxy London WC2 (24 June 1977: Harvest Records SHSP4069) – No. 24 UK Albums Chart

== See also ==
- List of 1970s punk rock musicians
- List of Peel Sessions
- List of performers on Top of the Pops
- List of punk bands from the United Kingdom
- Music of the United Kingdom (1970s)
