= Poly Styrene =

Punk musician (1957–2011)

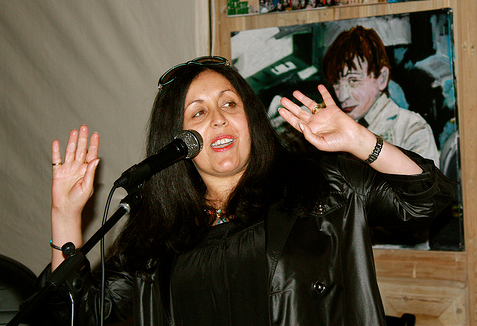
- Styrene in 2010

Background information
- Born: Marianne Joan Elliott-Said; 3 July 1957; Bromley, England
- Died: 25 April 2011 (aged 53) Sussex, England
- Genres: Punk rock; new wave; kirtan; downtempo
- Occupations: Vocalist; songwriter
- Years active: 1976–2011
- Labels: Universal; EMI/Virgin; Future Noise Music
- Formerly of: X-Ray Spex

Marianne Joan Elliott-Said (3 July 1957 – 25 April 2011), known by the stage name Poly Styrene, was an British musician, singer-songwriter, and frontwoman for the punk rock band X-Ray Spex. She is considered a pioneer for the feminist punk movement.

== Early life ==
Poly Styrene was born Marianne Joan Elliott-Said in 1957 in Bromley, Kent, and brought up in Brixton, London. Her mother, who raised her alone, was a Scottish-Irish legal secretary. Her father was a Somali-born dock worker, although Poly Styrene used to tell the press that he was a dispossessed Somali aristocrat.

As a teenager, Styrene was a hippie. When she was 15, Styrene ran away from home with £3 in her pocket; she hitchhiked from one music festival to another, staying at hippie crash pads. She went home after she stepped on a rusty nail while bathing in a stream and had to be treated for sepsis.

== Music career ==
=== Demo and first single ===
Styrene recorded her first demo album in 1975, when she was 18 years old. Her manager enlisted Ted Bunting to produce the record.

In 1976, Styrene released her first single under her real name, Mari Elliott. Titled "Silly Billy", it was a reggae track with some ska influences. Her daughter Celeste has called it "similar to Althea and Donna, who she really liked." She co-wrote the B-side "What a Way" with the record's producer, Falcon Stuart. The single came in a GTO Records sleeve.

=== X-Ray Spex ===
After watching an early show by the Sex Pistols in an empty hall on Hastings Pier, playing a set of cover songs, she was inspired to put an ad out in music publications for "young punx who want to stick it together" to form a band. From this, she formed X-Ray Spex and became its lead singer, Poly Styrene, a name she chose from the yellow pages. She was described by Billboard as the "archetype for the modern-day feminist punk" because she wore dental braces, rebelled against the archetypal female sex object of the 1970s, sported a gaudy wardrobe, and was of mixed race. She was "one of the least conventional frontpersons in rock history, male or female." X-Ray Spex launched their debut single in 1977.

New York magazine's music journalist Nitsuh Abebe described her singing style with X-Ray Spex as "a bold, keening yelp" and "fierce but fiercely feminine."

=== Solo career ===
After the original line-up of X-Ray Spex broke up in 1979, Poly Styrene recorded a solo album, Translucence, in 1980. The album abandoned X-Ray Spex's loud guitar work for a quieter and more jazzy sound that has since been described as foreshadowing later work by Everything but the Girl. In 1986, she released the EP God's & Godesses [sic] on the Awesome record label. A new-age solo album, Flower Aeroplane, followed in 2004.

In 2007, Styrene was invited to the Concrete Jungle festival in Camber Sands by her friend John Robb; Styrene and the festival's organiser, Symond Lawes, agreed to celebrate the 30th anniversary of X-Ray Spex's debut album, Germfree Adolescents. The celebrations included a live show on 6 September 2008 at the Camden Roundhouse, which was sold out. A live album and DVD recording of this event, Live @ The Roundhouse London 2008, was released in November 2009 on the Year Zero label by Future Noise Music.

She made a guest appearance at the 2008 30th anniversary concert of Rock Against Racism in Victoria Park, London, performing "Oh Bondage Up Yours!" with guest musicians Drew McConnell and David "Flash" Wright. That same year, she dueted with John Robb on a remix of Goldblade's "City of Christmas Ghosts".

In March 2009, Styrene joined other members of PRS for Music in criticising Google for allegedly not paying a fair share of royalties to musicians. This followed Google's removal of millions of videos from YouTube because of a royalties dispute with the organisation.

She released a free download of "Black Christmas" in November 2010. Inspired by a Los Angeles killing spree by a man dressed as Santa Claus, "Black Christmas" was written in collaboration with her daughter, Celeste.

Poly Styrene released a solo album titled Generation Indigo, produced by Martin Glover, in March 2011 via Future Noise Music. "Virtual Boyfriend" was the first single from Generation Indigo released on 21 March 2011 via Spinner Music alongside the launch of her new website, and featured an animated promotional video directed by Ben Wheele. The album received critical acclaim, including a perfect score in Artrocker magazine and an 8/10 in The Daily Telegraph. It was released in the US on 24 April 2011, the day before her death.

"Ghoulish" was the first posthumous single to be released from Generation Indigo, and was accompanied by a remix from Hercules and Love Affair.

The band U2 paid tribute to Styrene during the "HerStory" video tribute to notable women in 2017 for the 30th anniversary of The Joshua Tree during a performance of "Ultraviolet (Light My Way)" from the band's 1991 album Achtung Baby. In 2023, Rolling Stone ranked Poly Styrene at number 195 on its list of the 200 Greatest Singers of All Time.

== Personal life ==
In 1978, after a gig in Doncaster, South Yorkshire, Styrene had a vision of a pink light in the sky and felt objects crackling when she touched them. Thinking she was hallucinating, her mother took her to the hospital. She was diagnosed with bipolar disorder in 1991.

In 1983, Styrene was initiated into the Hare Krishna movement and recorded at their recording studios while living as a devotee at Bhaktivedanta Manor. She lived as a Hare Krishna convert in Hertfordshire and London from 1983 to 1988. Styrene was a vegetarian.

In 1995, Styrene's solo work was put on hold when she suffered a fractured pelvis after being knocked down by a fire engine.

In March 2009, Styrene took part in the inaugural Instigate Debate night. The night's theme was modern-day consumerism. Other current issues were also discussed.

Styrene lived alone in St Leonards, East Sussex.

=== Death ===
In February 2011, The Sunday Times magazine published an interview which largely focused on Styrene's past and present relationship with her daughter, Celeste. In the interview, Styrene revealed that she had been treated for breast cancer, and that it had spread to her spine and lungs. She died of metastatic breast cancer on 25 April 2011, at the age of 53.

== Documentary and biography ==
Author Zoë Howe and Styrene's daughter Celeste Bell co-authored a biography of Styrene that was published in November 2018. The book, titled Day Glo: The Poly Styrene Story, was published in the United States in September 2019.

In 2021, Styrene was the subject of a documentary, Poly Styrene: I Am a Cliché, that was initially crowd-funded until the project got some investment from Sky Arts. The documentary was co-written by Howe and Bell, with Bell also directing with Paul Sng and providing the narration with Ruth Negga. The documentary coincided with the 40th anniversary of the release of the first X-Ray Spex album, Germfree Adolescents. The world premiere of I Am a Cliché took place online on 27 February 2021, with the film being released on digital formats on 5 March 2021 and broadcast by Sky Arts on 6 March 2021.

On 17 August 2026, Poly Styrene was the subject of Great Lives on BBC Radio 4, hosted by Matthew Parris. Poly was nominated by Pauline Black, lead singer of The Selecter. Parris was also joined by biographer Zoë Howe, and Poly Styrene's daughter, Celeste Bell (co-author).

== Discography ==
=== Albums ===
- Translucence (United Artists, 1980)
- Flower Aeroplane (2004)
- Generation Indigo (Future Noise Music, 2011)

=== EPs ===
- Gods & Goddesses (Awesome, 1986)

=== Singles ===
- "Silly Billy"/"What A Way" – as Mari Elliott (GTO, 1976)
- "Talk in Toytown"/"Sub Tropical" (United Artists, 1980)
- "City of Christmas Ghosts" – Goldblade featuring Poly Styrene (Damaged Goods, 2008)
- "Black Christmas" (2010)
- "Virtual Boyfriend" (2011)
- "Ghoulish" (2011)
