= Outsider. Freud =

2025 documentary film about Sigmund Freud

- Directed by: Yair Qedar
- Written by: Yair Qedar
- Produced by: Yair Qedar
- Edited by: Noit Geva; Tomi Shlez-Shafrir
- Animation by: Tal Kantor; Moshe Zilbernagel
- Release date: January 5, 2025 (Haifa International Film Festival)
- Running time: 66 minutes
- Countries: Israel; Austria; Germany; Sweden
- Languages: Hebrew, English, German, French

Outsider. Freud is a 2025 documentary film written, directed, and produced by Yair Qedar, about the life and work of Sigmund Freud, the founder of psychoanalysis. The film combines excerpts from Freud's letters, interviews with psychoanalysts and historians, archival footage, and animation, and examines how Freud's experience as a Jewish outsider in Vienna shaped his theories and his life.

The film premiered at the 40th Haifa International Film Festival on January 5, 2025, and was screened at the Sigmund Freud Museum in Vienna on January 9, 2025. It won the 2025 Gradiva Award for Best Documentary from the American Psychoanalytic Foundation.

== Synopsis ==
The documentary tells Freud's life in four chapters: "The Jew", "Freud Becomes Freud", "Love/Death", and "Exile". It covers Freud's Jewish identity in antisemitic Vienna, his discovery of the unconscious, his cancer diagnosis and the deaths of his daughter Sophie and his grandson, and his flight to England in 1938 following the Anschluss.

The film features commentary by psychoanalysts and Freud scholars including Adam Phillips, Christfried Tögel, Lisa Appignanesi, Rémy Amouroux, Michael Molnar, Eran Rolnik, and Anat Tzur Mahalel. Excerpts from Freud's correspondence are read by Austrian actor Karl Markovics. A recurring train motif refers to Freud's own metaphor for free association in psychoanalytic treatment.

== Production ==
Outsider. Freud is part of Qedar's documentary project "The Hebrews" (Ha'Ivrim), a series of biographical films about figures of Jewish and Hebrew culture, and followed his films about Baruch Spinoza and Karl Marx in a planned trilogy about Jewish thinkers. Qedar worked on the film for about five years, longer than on any of his previous films. He told The Jerusalem Post: "The problem with making a film about Freud is that there is too much information, he is the most written-about person in the modern world... I had to take the natural representation and put it aside and decide how we can re-approach the known Freud."

The film is an international co-production, made with the support of broadcasters in Israel (Kan), Austria (ORF), Germany (Arte–RBB), and Sweden (SVT). The animation was created by Tal Kantor, whose short film Letter to a Pig was nominated for an Academy Award, together with Moshe Zilbernagel. The film incorporates rare home movies of Freud, most of which were shot by Marie Bonaparte.

== Release ==
The film's original soundtrack is in four languages – Hebrew, English, German, and French – and it has been released in subtitled versions in 14 languages. Following its premiere at the Haifa International Film Festival, the film was broadcast on the Israeli public broadcaster Kan 11. It was screened internationally at venues including the Sigmund Freud Museum in Vienna, the Freud Museum in London, the Library of Congress in Washington, D.C., Stanford University, and the University of Pennsylvania.

== Reception ==
Hannah Brown of The Jerusalem Post wrote that the film "illuminates Freud's life in new ways" and described its "powerful, dreamlike animation". Reviewing the film for the University of Pennsylvania blog Psyche on Campus, Francesco Salamone called it "no conventional bio-pic", writing that it "uses filmic techniques to explore the strange inside-out world of Freudian psychoanalysis" with "mesmerizing Surrealist dream-sequences".

== Awards ==
- Gradiva Award for Best Documentary, American Psychoanalytic Foundation (2025)
- Best Feature Animation Documentary Film, Jaipur International Film Festival (2025)
