= Statue of Sigmund Freud, Hampstead =

Statue in London by Oscar Nemon

Coordinates: 51°32′46.33″N 0°10′32.14″W

Statue of Sigmund Freud
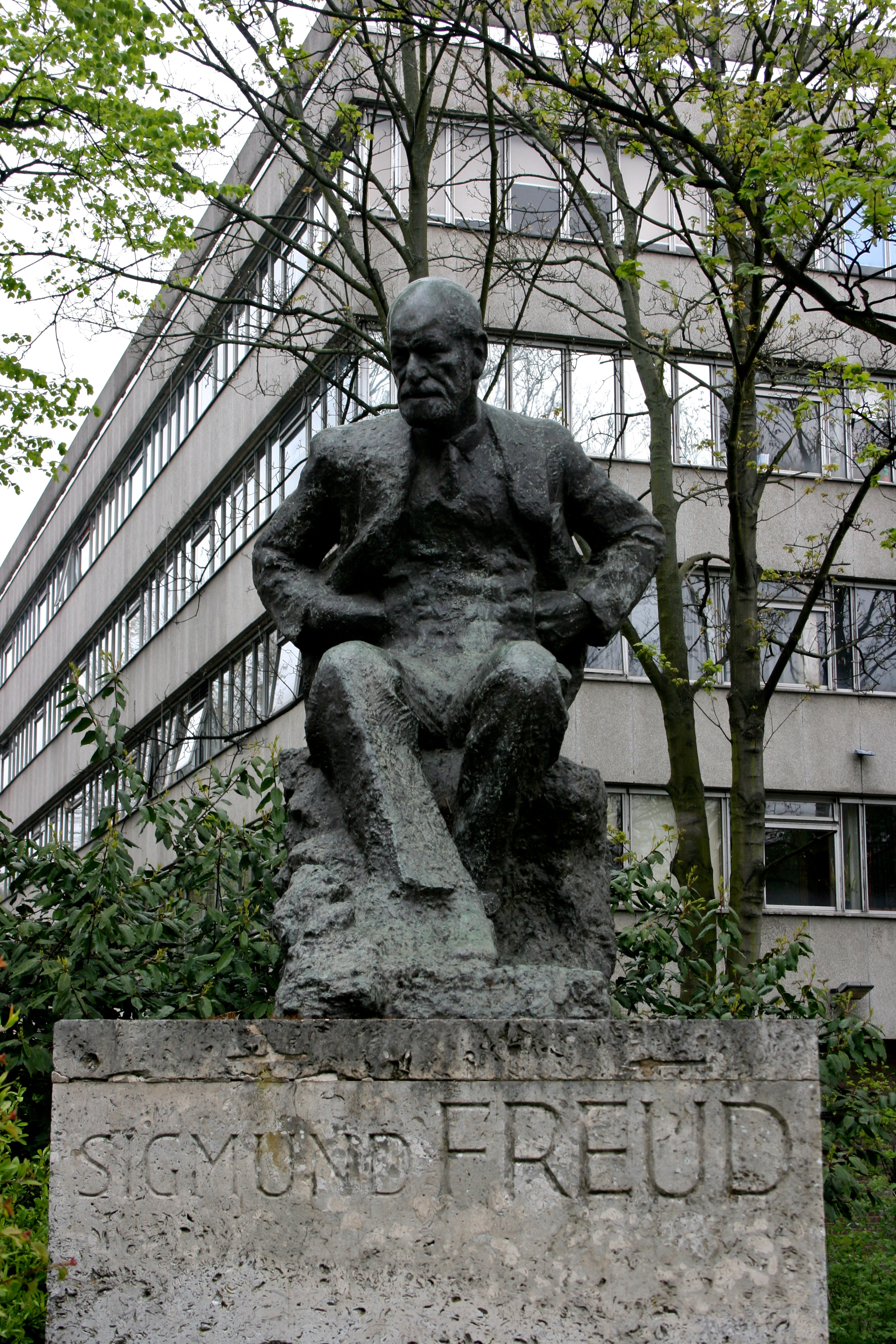
- Artist: Oscar Nemon
- Year: c. 1970
- Medium: Bronze
- Location: London, NW3 United Kingdom

Listed Building – Grade II
- Official name: Sigmund Freud statue
- Designated: 19 January 2016
- Reference no.: 1431355

A statue of Sigmund Freud, the founder of psychoanalysis, is situated in the grounds of the Tavistock Clinic, at the junction of Fitzjohns Avenue and Belsize Lane, in Hampstead, North London. The seated bronze statue on a limestone plinth is a work of the sculptor Oscar Nemon. Freud lived nearby at 20 Maresfield Gardens for the last months of his life; his house is now the Freud Museum.

Oscar Nemon was born and educated in Osijek before moving to work in Vienna in the 1920s. He had read Freud in his teens, initially approached Freud as a young sculptor and was rejected by him. After Nemon had gained his reputation in Brussels, he was approached by Freud's assistant Paul Federn in 1931 to sculpt Freud for his 75th birthday. Nemon finished busts of Freud in wood, bronze and plaster, and Freud chose to keep the wooden portrait for himself. The wooden bust is on display at the Freud Museum in Hampstead. Nemon visited Freud for a final time in London in 1938. His last sittings with Freud would create a "harsher[,] more abstracted portrait" which would become the head for the seated bronze in Hampstead.

Freud wrote in his diary in July 1931 of Nemon's portrait that "The head, which the gaunt, goatee-bearded artist has fashioned from the dirt like the good Lord is very good and an astonishingly life-like impression of me." On seeing the head of Freud, his housekeeper Paula Fichtl said that Nemon had made Freud look "too angry", to which Freud responded, "But I am angry. I am angry with humanity."

The bronze, slightly larger than life size, was commissioned in the 1960s, with funds raised by a committee chaired by Donald Winnicott. The sculpture portrays Freud with his head turned to one side as if in thought, with his hands in his waistcoat pockets. Freud's daughter Anna Freud attended the unveiling of the statue in October 1970, accompanied by children from her Hampstead Clinic (now the Anna Freud Centre). The statue was originally located in "an alcove behind Swiss Cottage Library, where it was virtually hidden away from the public." The Freud Museum arranged for the statue to be moved to its present location in 1998.

The statue was listed Grade II on the National Heritage List for England in January 2016.
