= Hyme House =

House in Hampstead, London, England

Coordinates: 51°32′48″N 0°10′34″W

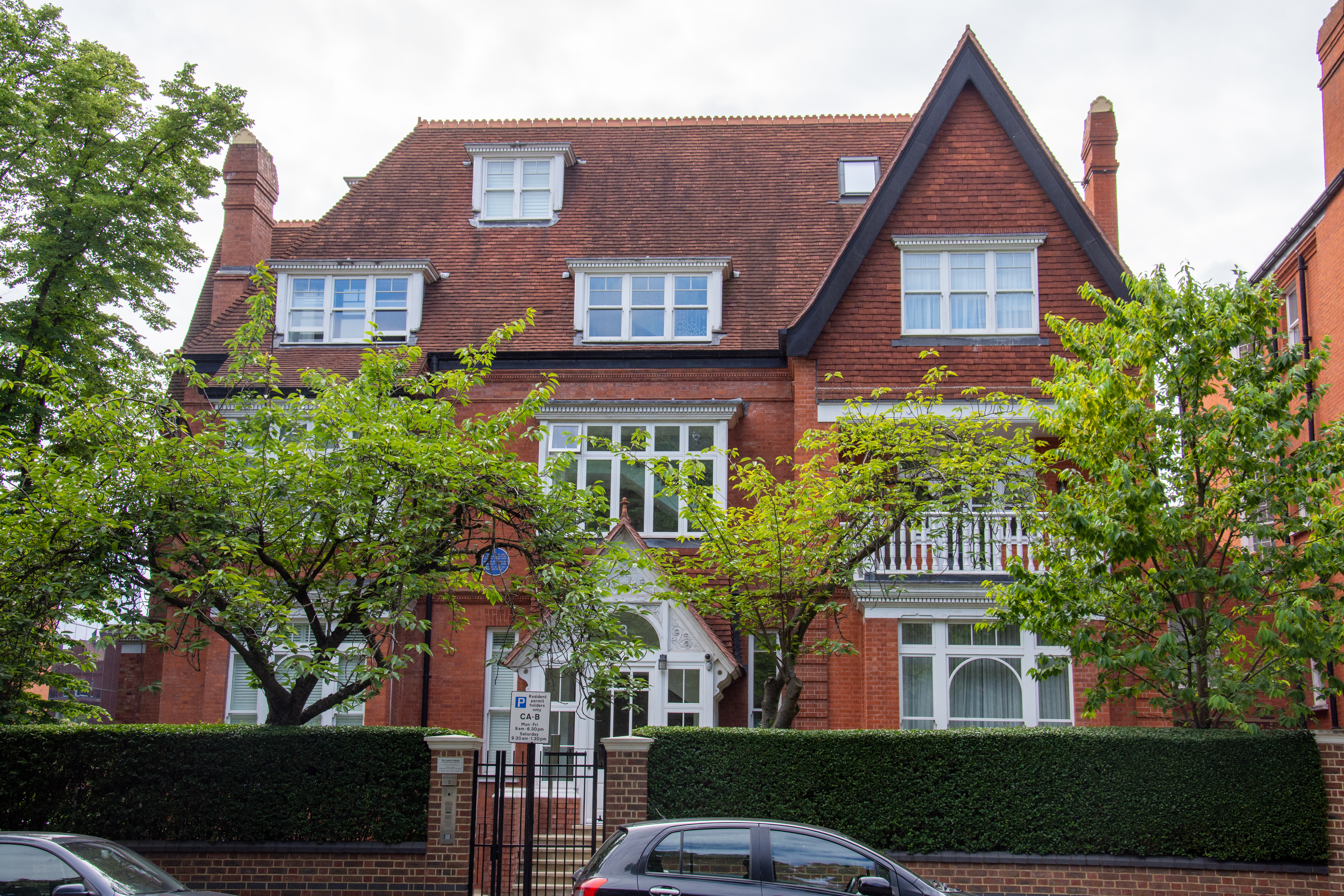
De Laszlo House, Hampstead

Hyme House, at 3 Fitzjohns Avenue, Hampstead, England, was the London home of society portrait painter Philip de László. He painted many of his portraits at sittings in the studio and gardens of Hyme House. Sitters included royalty, celebrities, businesspeople and politicians from the 1920s and 1930s.

== History ==
The house was built in 1886; de László and his wife, heiress Lucy Guinness (3), lived there from 1921 to 1937.

In 1938 the Sisters of Mercy of the Holy Cross, a Catholic Religious Order, acquired Hyme House and later took over the villas at numbers 5 and 7. The Order linked the three villas into a girls' school, which operated up until 1985 (3). The house then became the Fitzjohn's Lodge Hotel (3).

== Construction ==
In 1875 Hampstead landowner Spencer Maryon-Wilson commissioned land agent F.J. Clark and developer John Culverhouse, to design an architectural master plan to provide new housing on part of his Hampstead estate. Finalised in 1876, the master plan was centred on a tree-lined boulevard, known as Fitzjohns Avenue (named after one of the family's country homes), lined with 70 villas and chestnut trees (3).

Around this main boulevard were a series of adjoining streets including Netherhall and Maresfield Gardens, named after the Manor House and parish of the Maryon-Wilson's estate in Sussex (3).

Located on large building plots, all the houses were detached or semi-detached villas set well back from the roads, with long front paths and generous front and rear gardens. The houses were designed in either Queen Anne revival, Gothic or Arts and Crafts-influenced styles, the last a tribute to Norman Shaw who designed a series of buildings in the local Hampstead area (3).

The neighbourhood of Fitzjohn's Avenue was built in the 10 years after 1876. In 1883 Harpers Magazine called Fitzjohn's Avenue "one of the noblest streets in the world". (3)

== Architecture ==
In 1886 No.3 Fitzjohn's Avenue was built and was known as Hyme House. The house was built in the style of the Arts & Crafts movement, with a brick, tile-hung and terracotta facade with large bay windows, balconies, ornate pediments, decorative brickwork, carved brackets, terracotta gabling, feature chimneys and hand-crafted entrance porticos (3).

The interiors of Hyme House and studio had oak flooring with high ceilings, elegant ceiling cornicing and panelled doors (4). The furniture was predominantly Italian, with Flemish tapestries and de László's paintings on the walls (4). Antiques included a 13th-century Sicilian chest, pieces by Auguste Rodin, and Louis XIV candlesticks and a sculpture of the King on horseback that had once been in the Palais de Versailles (4).

== Owners ==
It was sold to J. Lewis, a wealthy South African diamond merchant, who acquired a second plot of land to the south of the main house on which was built garaging and a hard tennis court (1). The house was then sold to August Ries, who lived in it for many years until it was sold in 1921 to portrait painter Philip de László.

=== Philip de László ===
Philip de László was born in Budapest in 1869 and studied at the National Academy of Art, followed by art studies in Munich and Paris (2). He became a portrait painter, and won a Grand Gold Medal at the Paris International Exhibition of 1900 for his portrait of Pope Leo XIII (2). In the same year he married society beauty Lucy Guinness; they had five sons. In 1907 Philip and Lucy de László moved to England (2) where he spent the rest of his life. He became a British subject in 1914, and in 1930 he was elected President of the Royal Society of British Artists (2).

In January 1921 Philip, Lucy and family moved into Hyme House(1). Its grounds, which contained gardens, garaging with a flat above, and a hard tennis court were large enough to allow an artist's studio to be built in the grounds, linked to the main house by a covered walkway (1). de László obtained a licence to build the studio from Spencer Maryon-Wilson, the original landowner and master developer of Fitzjohn's Avenue and its surrounding roads. The studio opened onto a stone patio and lawns, lined with mature hedges and trees (1).

In the studio and gardens of Hyme House de László painted many of his best-known portraits. At the height of his fame he could command an extraordinary £3,000 for a full-length portrait.

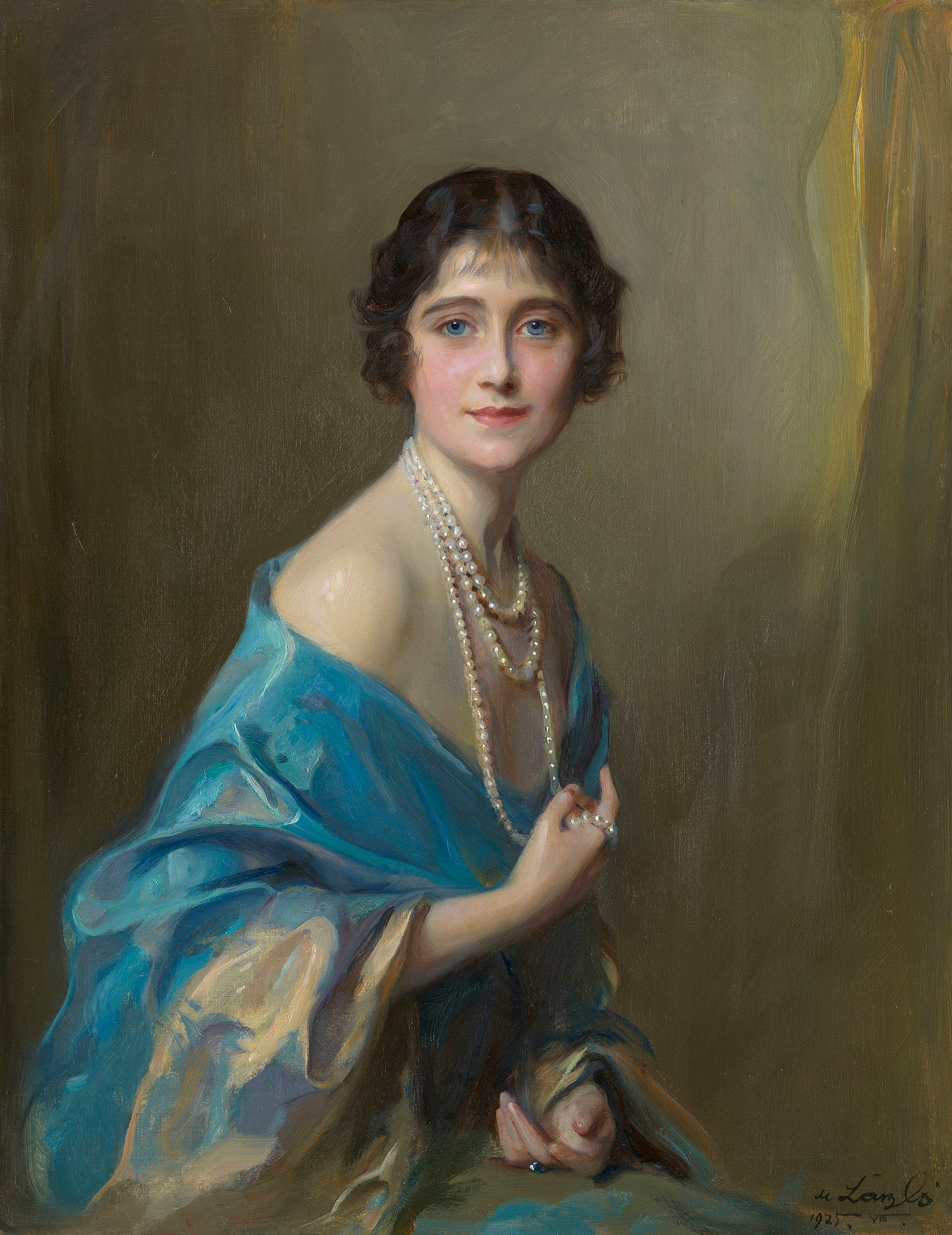
Philip de László - Elizabeth, Duchess of York 1925

In 1925 and 1931, the Duchess of York (later Queen Elizabeth The Queen Mother) sat for portraits in the studio at Hyme House, accompanied by Princess Elizabeth of York (later Queen Elizabeth II) (2). In 1933, Princess Elizabeth had her portrait painted, with part of the sitting done in the Hampstead studio and the background completed at Windsor Castle. This was the first official portrait sitting for a painter by Princess Elizabeth (2).

Princess Marina, Duchess of Kent, sister-in-law King George VI, had her portrait painted in the studio in 1934. Other royal visitors included Queen Marie of Romania and Prince Chichibu of Japan, the brother of Emperor Hirohito (2). Prince Chichibu and his wife Princess Setsuko attended the coronation of King George VI in 1937; while in London they visited the studio at Hyme House to have their portraits painted (2).

Film footage survives of Philip de László entertaining Princess Elizabeth and the Duke and Duchess of York at Hyme House in 1933. Other visitors filmed in the studio and lawns of the villa include Prince George, Duke of Kent, and the Maharaja of Jaipur (5).

During the 1920s and 1930s many artists, writers, magazine and newspaper editors, merchants and physicians lived in Fitzjohn's; its close proximity to the centre of London enabled people to commute daily (3).

No 61 was the home of painter Edwin Long (1829–91), artist John Pettie (1839–93) lived at No.62, artist Paul Falconer Poole (1807–79) lived at No.75 and No.6 was the home of portrait painter Frank Holl (1845–88) (3).

There were so many artists on the avenue that it became a tradition for their houses to be opened on special days – known as "Show Sundays" - for friends, colleagues, and neighbours to see their latest artwork. According to novelist Max Pemberton (1863–1950) who lived at No.50, the "Show Sundays" attracted everyone from "those who should have been a source of inspiration to the makers of the latest fashions" (3).

Philip de László's last royal portrait was of the Duke of Connaught and Strathearn, completed at Fitzjohn's Avenue on the morning of 20 October 1937. On 20 November of that year the Government of Hungary conferred upon him the Badge of the Corvinus Order of Honour, Hungary's highest award for artistic merit (2).

De László died on 22 November 1937 at the age of 68 (2). After World War II an honorary (not officially listed) blue plaque was fitted on the wall of his former home, commemorating his life and time at the villa (3).

In March 1938 Cardinal Arthur Hinsley, Catholic Archbishop of Westminster, acquired Hyme House. Philip's studio was converted into a chapel, and on the site of the garage and tennis court a church, dedicated to St. Thomas More, was later constructed (1).

In the same year, the Cardinal invited the Sisters of Mercy of the Holy Cross, a Swiss-based Catholic religious order, to acquire Hyme House to serve as their first foundation in England (1). During the Second World War Hyme House served as a nursing home for injured civilians and military personnel, run by the Sisters of Mercy.

== Since 1945 ==
After the war, the Sisters of Mercy also took over the two villas at No.s 5 and 7 (3). The Order linked and converted the three villas into a convent and girls' school. In 1985 the villas became the Fitzjohn's Lodge Hotel(3). In 2006 development company Mayfair Developments acquired the property and began a five-year construction project to convert the site back to residential use.

== Sources ==
(1) Parish Letter (1944) – Parish of St. Thomas, Swiss Cottage, written by Father Barnard Whelan, Rector

(2) Portrait of a Painter, Biography of Philip de Laszlo by Owen Rutter, London 1939. Facsimile edition published by the de Laszlo Foundation 2003

(3) Camden Borough Council. Fitzjohn's Conservation Area Paper

(4) Enchantment down the Centuries, by Susan Lander, All England Magazine (No. 212) Published January 1935
