= Freud Museum (disambiguation) =

The Freud Museum in London is a museum dedicated to Sigmund Freud.

Freud Museum may also refer to:

- Sigmund Freud Museum (Vienna), Austria
- Sigmund Freud Museum (Příbor), Czech Republic

== See also ==
- Sigmund Freud
