= Gay Days =

A gay day is a scheduled time at an establishment dedicated to attracting and catering to the gay community.

Gay Days may refer to:

- Gay Days (film), a 2009 Israeli documentary film
- Gay Days at Walt Disney World, an unofficial annual LGBT event at Disney World
