= Freud Museum =

Historic house museum in London, England

Coordinates: 51°32′54″N 0°10′40″W

The Freud Museum
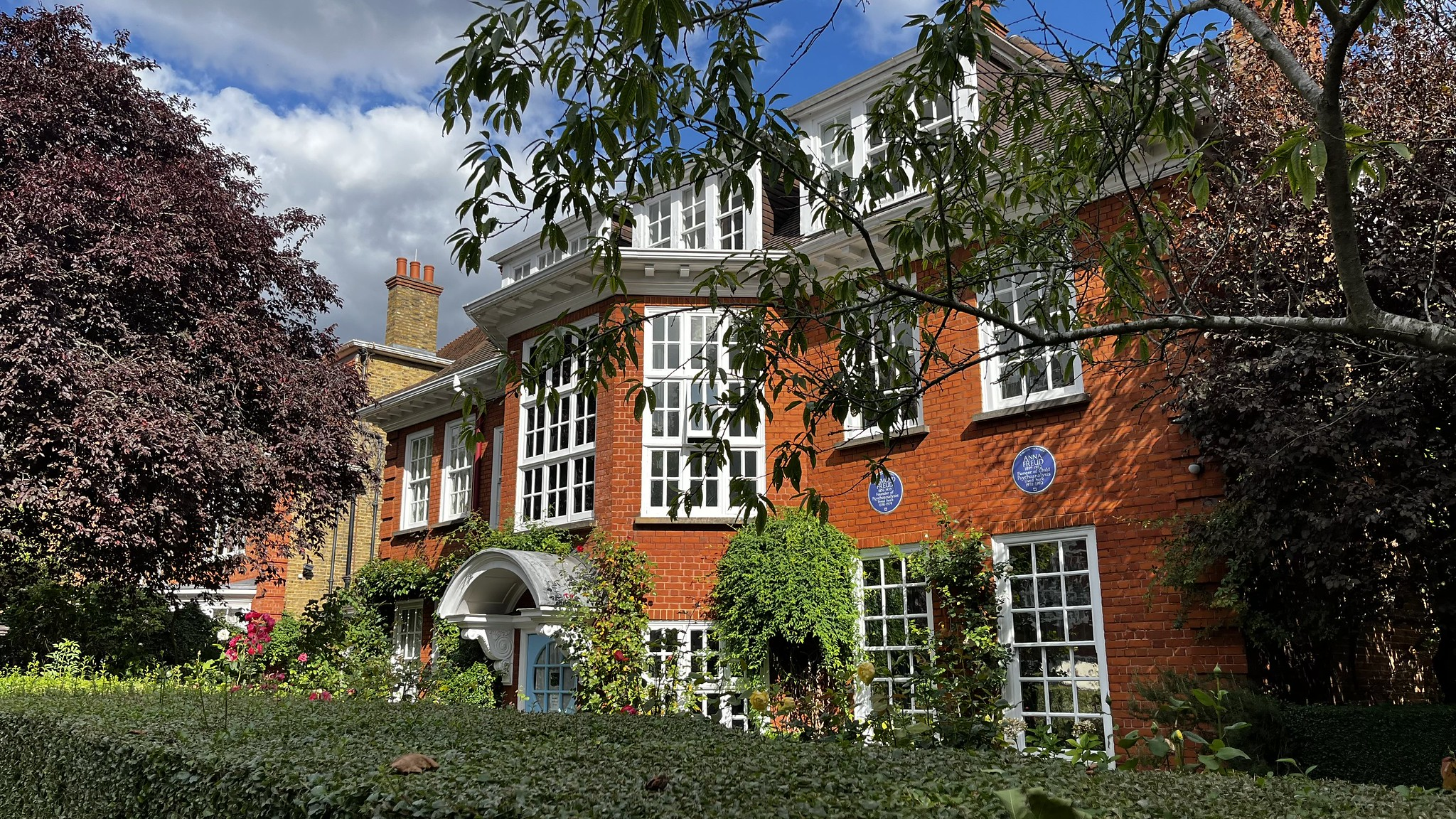
- The museum in 2023

- Location within London Borough of Camden
- Established: 28 July 1986; 40 years ago
- Location: Maresfield Gardens; London, NW3; United Kingdom
- Public transit access: Hampstead; Finchley Road & Frognal; Finchley Road
- Website: freud.org.uk

The Freud Museum in London is a museum dedicated to Sigmund Freud, located in the house where Freud lived with his family during the last year of his life. In 1938, after escaping Nazi annexation of Austria he came to London via Paris and stayed for a short while at 39 Elsworthy Road before moving to 20 Maresfield Gardens, where the museum is situated. Although he died a year later in the same house, his daughter Anna Freud continued to live there until her death in 1982. It was her wish that after her death it be converted into a museum. It was opened to the public in July 1986.

Freud continued to work in London, and it was here that he completed his 1939 book Moses and Monotheism. He also maintained his practice in this home and saw a number of his patients for analysis. The centrepiece of the museum is the couch brought from Berggasse 19, Vienna on which his patients were asked to say whatever came to their mind without consciously selecting information, named the free association technique by him.

The museum was the subject of Part 2 of Richard Macer's three-part BBC documentary series Behind the Scenes at the Museum in 2010.

The museum's president is David Freud, the great-grandson of Sigmund Freud and architect of Universal Credit.

There are two other Freud Museums, one in Vienna, and another in Příbor, the Czech Republic, in the house where Sigmund Freud was born.

== Location and description ==
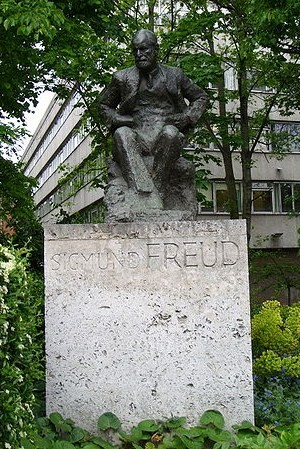
Statue of Sigmund Freud by Oscar Nemon, a two-minute walk from the museum at the corner of Fitzjohns Avenue and Belsize Lane.

The museum is located at 20 Maresfield Gardens in Hampstead, one of London's suburbs.

The ground floor of the museum houses Freud's study, library, hall and the dining room. The museum shop is on ground floor as well. The first floor has a video room, Anna Freud's room and there is a temporary exhibitions room which hosts alternate contemporary art and Freud-themed exhibitions. Art installations often use several rooms within the museum, such as the 2001/02 exhibition "A Visit to Freud’s" by Austrian photographer Uli Aigner. Many areas such as the kitchen and Anna Freud's consulting room are out of public view and have been converted into offices.

== Building ==
The house had only finished being built in 1920 in the British Queen Anne Revival style. A small sun room in a modern style was added at the rear by Ernst Ludwig Freud that same year. Freud was over eighty at this time, and he died the following year, but the house remained in his family until his youngest daughter Anna Freud, who was a pioneer of child therapy, died in 1982.

The house has a well-maintained garden that is still much as Freud knew it.

== Collection ==
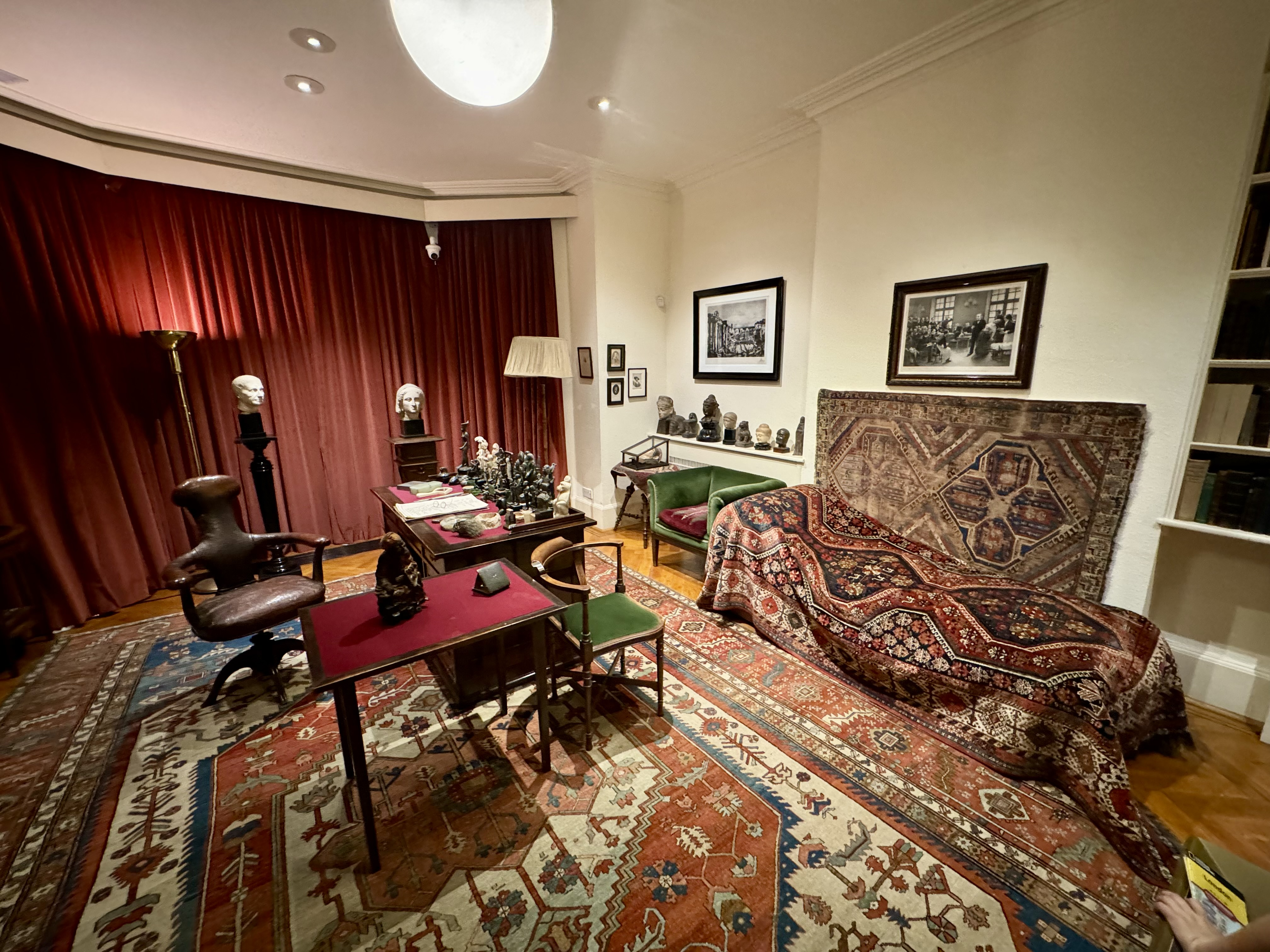
Freud's couch and office in his museum in Hampstead, London (2024).

The Freuds moved all their furniture and household effects to London. They include Biedermeier chests, tables and cupboards, and a collection of 18th- and 19th-century Austrian painted country furniture. The museum owns Freud's collection of Egyptian, Greek, Roman, and Oriental antiquities, and his personal library.

The star exhibit in the museum is Freud's psychoanalytic couch, which had been given to him by one of his patients, Madame Benvenisti, in 1890. This was restored at a cost of £5000 in 2013.

The study and library were preserved by Anna Freud after her father's death. The bookshelf behind Freud's desk contains some of his favourite authors, not only Goethe and Shakespeare but also Heine, Multatuli and Anatole France. Freud acknowledged that poets and philosophers had gained insights into the unconscious that psychoanalysis sought to explain systematically. In addition to the books, the library contains various pictures hung as Freud arranged them; these include 'Oedipus and the Riddle of the Sphinx' and 'The Lesson of Dr Charcot' plus photographs of Martha Freud, Lou Andreas-Salomé, Yvette Guilbert, Marie Bonaparte, and Ernst von Fleischl.

The collection includes a portrait of Freud by surrealist artist Salvador Dalí.

The museum organises research and publication programmes and it has an education service that organises seminars, conferences, and educational visits to the museum. The museum is a member of the London Museums of Health & Medicine.

== See also ==
- Sigmund Freud Museum (Vienna)
- A Clinical Lesson at the Salpêtrière, 1887 painting by André Brouillet
