= Gay Days (film) =

Israeli documentary film

- Directed by: Yair Qedar
- Release date: June 26, 2009 (Tel Aviv)
- Running time: 72 minutes
- Country: Israel
- Language: Hebrew
- Budget: $150,000

Gay Days (Hebrew: הזמן הוורוד, romanized: Hazman havarod, lit. 'The Pink Time') is a 2009 Israeli documentary film about the emergence of an LGBTQ community in Israel, starring major activists in Israel's cultural life and LGBT community: Gal Uchovsky, Eytan Fox, Ellyot, Amalia Ziv, Amit Kama and others and some rare archival footage from pride events, feature films and student films.

== Screenings and reception ==
The film premiered in June 2009 in the Tel Aviv International LGBT Film Festival, 2009. The film also showed in the Panorama at the 60th Berlin International Film Festival and the London Lesbian and Gay Film Festival 2010. and it is shown all over the world since in universities, film festivals and cinematic events.

The television premiere was on the Israeli documentary channel yes Docu, during July 2009. In solidarity with the LGBTQ community, it was shown on commercial tv network Keshet the day after the August 1, 2009, mass shooting at an LGBTQ+ youth center in Tel Aviv that resulted in two deaths and multiple injuries.

== See also ==
- LGBT rights in Israel
- Homosexuality and Judaism
