= Philip de László =

Anglo-Hungarian artist (1869–1937)

Philip de László MVO RBA
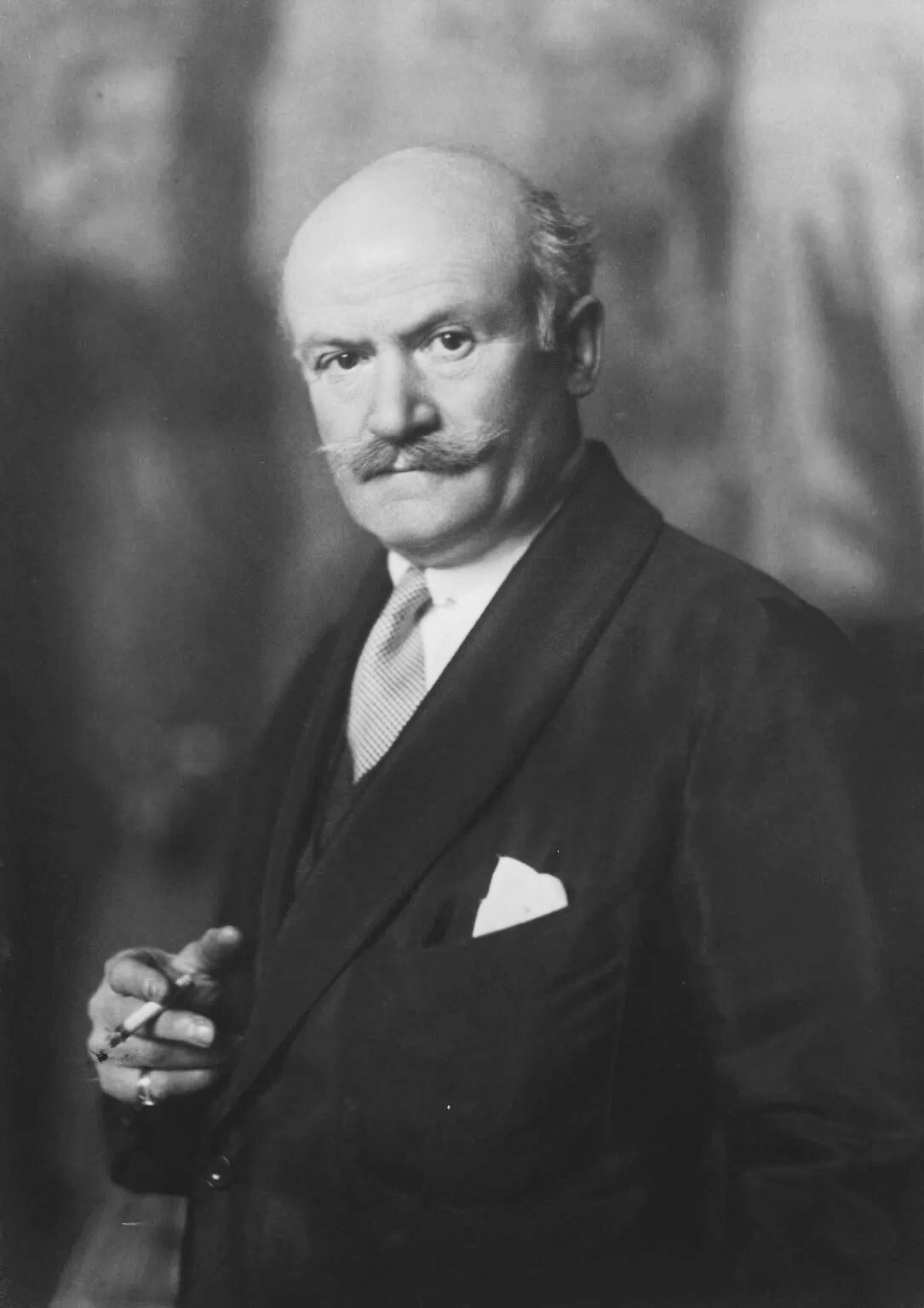
- Portrait by Walter Benington, 1928
- Born: Fülöp Laub; 30 April 1869; Pest, Austria-Hungary
- Died: 22 November 1937 (aged 68); Hyme House, Hampstead, London, United Kingdom
- Education: National Academy of Art
- Known for: Portraits
- Spouse: Lucy Guinness (m. 1900)
- Children: 6
- Awards: Paris International Exhibition; Member of the Royal Victorian Order

Signature
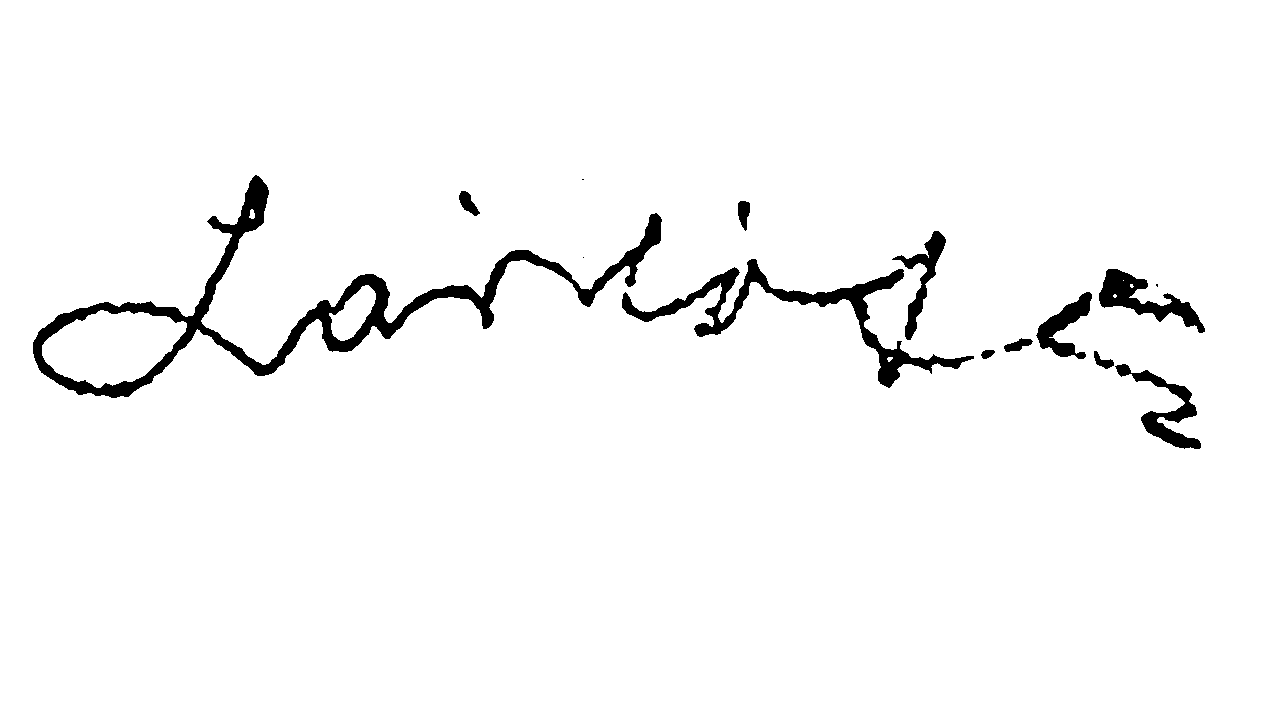

Philip Alexius László de Lombos MVO RBA (born Fülöp Laub; Hungarian: László Fülöp Elek; 30 April 1869 – 22 November 1937), known professionally as Philip de László, was an Anglo-Hungarian painter known particularly for his portraits of royal and aristocratic personages. In 1900, he married the Anglo-Irish socialite Lucy Guinness, and he became a British subject in 1914. László's patrons awarded him numerous honours and medals. He was invested with the Royal Victorian Order by Edward VII in 1909 and, in 1912, he was ennobled by Franz Joseph I of Austria; becoming a part of the Hungarian nobility. He was the successor to John Singer Sargent as the preeminent society portrait painter in Europe.

== Early life ==
László was born in seemingly humble circumstances in Pest (part of Budapest) as Fülöp Laub, the eldest son of Adolf and Johanna Laub, a tailor and seamstress of Jewish origin. Fülöp and his younger brother Marczi changed their surname to László in 1891.

He was apprenticed at an early age to a photographer while studying art, eventually earning a place at the National Academy of Art, where he studied under Bertalan Székely and Károly Lotz. He followed this with studies in Munich and Paris. László's portrait of Pope Leo XIII earned him a Grand Gold Medal at the Paris International Exhibition in 1900. In 1903, László moved from Budapest to Vienna. In 1907, he moved to England and remained based in London for the remainder of his life, although endlessly travelling the world to fulfil commissions.

== Personal life ==
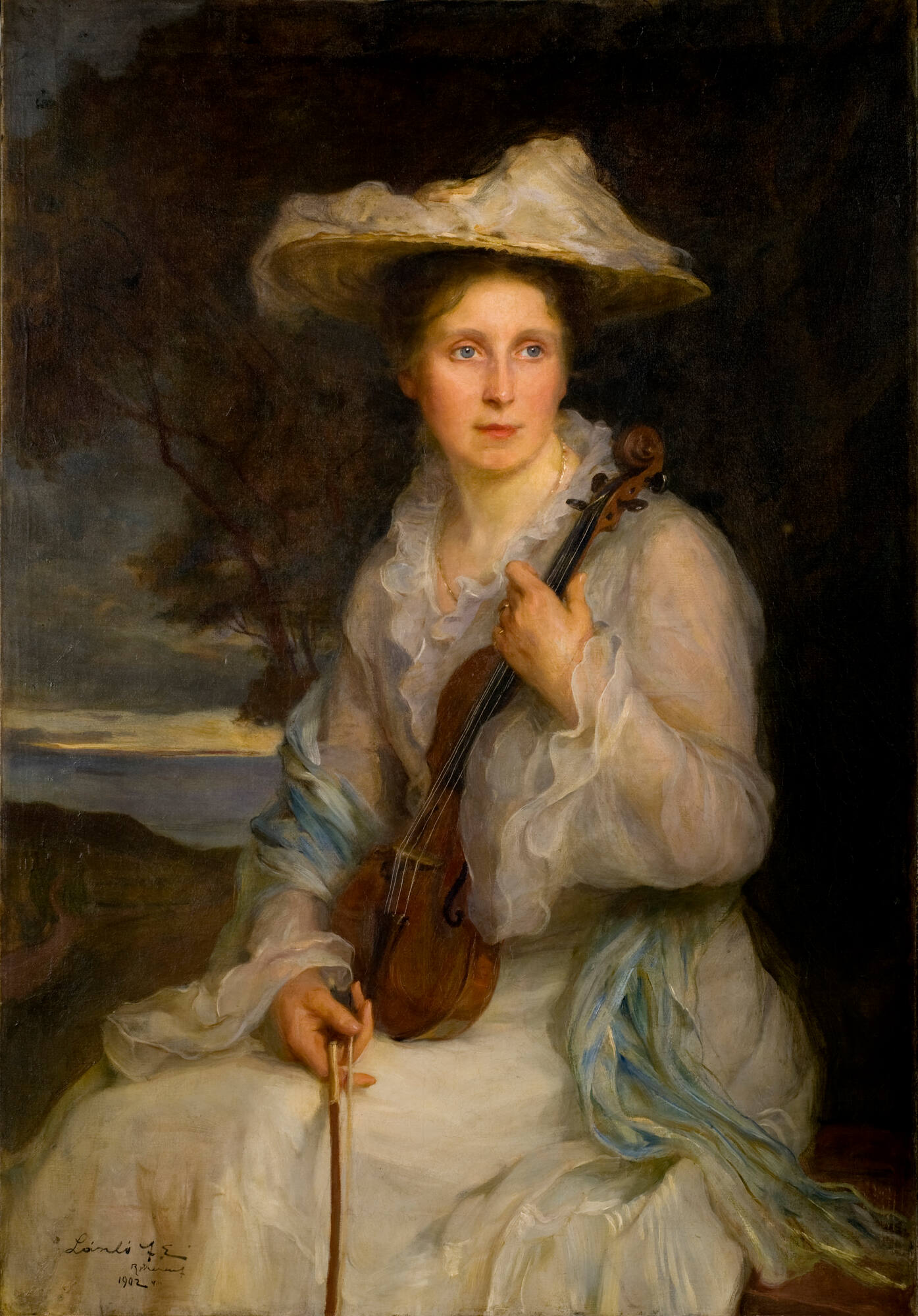
Portrait by Philip de László of his wife, Lucy

In 1900, László married Lucy Madeleine Guinness, a member of the banking branch of the Guinness family and a sister of Henry Guinness. They had first met in Munich in 1892, but for some years had been forbidden to see each other. The couple had six children and 17 grandchildren.

László became interested in Catholicism as a young man, probably through his friendship with the Valentins, an elderly Bavarian couple. He was baptised into the Catholic Church in 1894 ... "he never worshipped regularly but read the Bible and was a firm believer in God and the Christian story". His faith was especially strengthened by his visit to the Vatican in 1900, where he met and painted the aging Pope Leo XIII. László converted to Anglicanism upon his marriage, and his children were raised as Protestants. At a lecture to the Fisher Society in 1934, he said "I believe that to worship nature is a religious duty. I see in nature the fullest revelation of the Divinity, and my faith is that only by acceptance of this revelation and by striving to realise it in all its perfection can I prove my worship to be sincere".

== Later life ==
László's patrons awarded him numerous honours and medals. In July 1909, he was appointed Member of the Royal Victorian Order (MVO) by Edward VII. In 1912, he was ennobled by King Franz Joseph of Hungary; his surname then became "László de Lombos", but he soon was using the name "de László".

Despite his status as a British subject, his marriage and five British sons, de László was interned for over twelve months in 1917 and 1918 during the First World War, accused of making contact with the enemy (he had written letters to family members in Austria). He was released on grounds of ill health, and exonerated in June 1919.

De László suffered heart problems for the last years of his life. In October 1937, he had a heart attack and died a month later at his home, Hyme House, in Fitzjohns Avenue, Hampstead, London. His work was part of the painting event in the art competition at the 1932 Summer Olympics.

In 1939, Portrait of a Painter. The Authorized Life of Philip de László by Owen Rutter, written in conjunction with de László, was published. In 2010, Yale University Press published De László, His Life and Art by Duff Hart-Davis and Dr. Caroline Corbeau-Parsons. His reputation still remains largely as a society portrait painter, but well numbered amongst his sitters were industrialists and scientists, politicians and painters, men and women of letters and many other eminent, as well as ordinary, people. Family members and a team of editors are compiling a catalogue raisonné published online and in progress. His oeuvre currently numbers almost 4,000 works, including drawings.

De László had seventeen grandchildren, including descendants who influenced fields including a scientist, stockbroker, musician, photographer, lawyer, travel agent, publisher, investment manager, industrialist, farmer, doctor, a nun and just one artist.

== Subjects ==
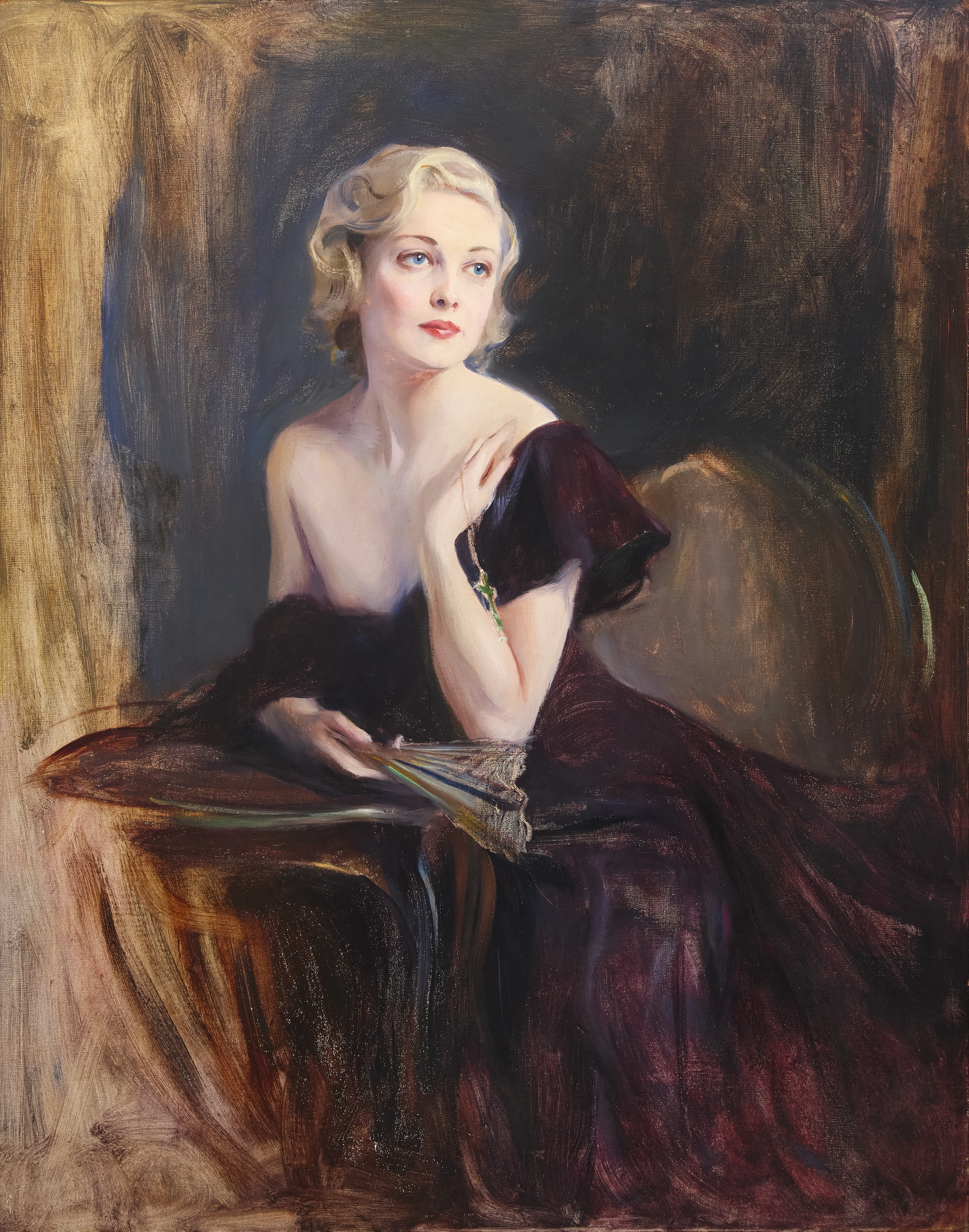
Mrs Philip Astley, née Madeleine Carroll by Philip Alexius de László (oil on canvas, circa 1935); one of at least two portraits of Carroll by de László

Portraits painted by László include the following individuals:

- Count Albert Apponyi (1897, 1930)
- Emperor Franz Joseph I of Austria (1899)
- Empress Elizabeth of Austria (posthumous, 1899)
- Arthur Balfour (1908, 1914)
- Count Leopold Berchtold (1907)
- George Bell, Bishop of Chichester (1931)
- Sir Henry Birchenough (1926)
- Madeleine Carroll (1935 + ?)
- Sir Ernest Cassel (1900)
- Count and Countess Jean de Castellane (1899)
- Robin Vane-Tempest-Stewart, 8th Marquess of Londonderry (1911)
- Lady Castlereagh (later Edith, Marchioness of Londonderry; 1913, 1918, 1927)
- William Cavendish-Bentinck, 6th Duke of Portland (1912)
- Sir Austen Chamberlain (1920)
- Elisabeth, Duchess of Clermont-Tonnerre (1902)
- U.S. President Calvin Coolidge (1926)
- George Curzon, 1st Marquess Curzon of Kedleston (former Earl Curzon of Kedleston; 1913)
- Grace Curzon, Marchioness Curzon of Kedleston (1916)
- Randall Davidson, Archbishop of Canterbury (1926)
- George Claridge Druce, British botanist (1931)
- Sir Alfred East (1907)
- William II, German Emperor (1908)
- Augusta Victoria, German Empress and Queen of Prussia (1899, 1908)
- Cecilie, German Crown Princess (1908)
- Princess Charlotte, Duchess of Saxe-Meiningen (1899)
- Bernhard III, Duke of Saxe-Meiningen (1899)
- Catherine, Baroness d'Erlanger (1899)
- Margaret Eustis Finley (1932)
- Georg von und zu Franckenstein (1925)
- The Duke and Duchess of Gramont (1902)
- Jacob Theodoor Cremer (1920)
- Prince Andrew of Greece and Denmark (1913)
- Princess Andrew of Greece (born Princess Alice of Battenberg; 1907, 1922)
- King Constantine I of Greece (1914)
- Princess Nicholas of Greece (former Grand Duchess Elena Vladimirovna of Russia; 1922)
- Queen Olga of Greece (1914)
- Princess Cecilie of Greece and Denmark (1914)
- Princess Anastasia of Greece and Denmark (1915)
- Prince Christopher of Greece and Denmark (1919)
- Princess George of Greece and Denmark (1921)
- Princess Olga of Greece and Denmark (1922)
- Elisabeth, Queen of Greece (1924, 1925)
- Gwen Mullins (1925)
- Princess Margarita of Greece and Denmark (1928)
- Princess Theodora of Greece and Denmark (1928)
- Princess Irene, Duchess of Aosta (1931)
- The Archimandrite Gregorius (1894)
- Lucy Guinness (Philip de László's future wife; 1901, 1902, 1918, 1919 and 1936)
- Prince Chlodwig zu Hohenlohe-Schillingsfürst (1899)
- Charles Holme (1928)
- Joseph Joachim (1903)
- Hudson Kearley, 1st Viscount Devonport (1914)
- Arnold Keppel, 8th Earl of Albemarle (1916)
- Jan Kubelik (1903)
- Cosmo Gordon Lang, Archbishop of Canterbury (1932, 1933)
- Johnny de László (Philip de László's youngest son; 1919)
- Stephen and Paul de László (his sons, 1910)
- Pope Leo XIII (1900)
- Lord Leverhulme (1926)
- James Lowther, 1st Viscount Ullswater (1907)
- Earl and Countess of Mansfield (separately) (Earl 1930, Countess 1927)
- James Robert Dundas McEwen (1915)
- Mary Frances Dundas McEwen (1913 or 1914)
- Andrew W. Mellon (1931)
- Baroness Conrad de Meyendorff (born Nadine Vladimimova Louguinine)
- Lord and Lady Minto (1912)
- Princess Charlotte of Monaco (1928)
- Prince Louis II of Monaco (1928)
- Jeanne de Montagnac, Madame Maximilian von Jaunez (1909, 1911, 1914)
- Louis Mountbatten, 1st Marquess of Milford Haven(1910, 1914; when Prince Louis of Battenberg)
- Edwina Mountbatten, Countess Mountbatten of Burma (1923, 1924; former Lady Louis Mountbatten)
- Victoria Mountbatten, Marchioness of Milford Haven (born Princess Victoria of Hesse and by Rhine; 1923)
- George Mountbatten, 2nd Marquess of Milford Haven (1924)
- Louis Mountbatten, 1st Earl Mountbatten of Burma (1925; former Lord Louis Mountbatten)
- William Waldegrave Palmer, 2nd Earl of Selborne (1911)
- Joseph Ferguson Peacocke, Archbishop of Dublin (1908)
- Alan Percy, 8th Duke of Northumberland (1927)
- Helen Percy, Duchess of Northumberland (1916, 1928 & 1937)
- Lady Elizabeth Percy (1922)
- Lord Richard Percy and Lady Diana Percy (1924)
- Professor Vittorio Putti (c. 1925)
- Mariano Cardinal Rampolla (1900)
- Frederick Roberts, 1st Earl Roberts (1911)
- Queen Marie of Romania (1924, 1936)
- Helen of Greece and Denmark (former Queen Mother of Romania; 1925)
- King Carol II of Romania (1936)
- King Ferdinand I of Romania (1936)
- King Michael I of Romania (1936)
- U.S. President Theodore Roosevelt (1910)
- Vita Sackville-West (1910)
- Charles Alexander, Grand Duke of Saxe-Weimar-Eisenach (1898)
- King Alfonso XIII of Spain (1927)
- Queen Victoria Eugenia of Spain (painted 1910, 1913, 1920, 1927, and 1928)
- Infante Gonzalo of Spain (1927)
- Infante Juan, Count of Barcelona (1927)
- Alfonso, Prince of Asturias (1927)
- Infante Jaime, Duke of Segovia (1927)
- Infanta Beatriz of Spain (1927)
- Infanta María Cristina of Spain (1927)
- Queen Louise of Sweden (former Princess Louise of Battenberg; 1907)
- Princess Beatrice (1912, 1926)
- Princess Louise, Duchess of Argyll (1915)
- Princess Alice, Countess of Athlone (1929, 1932)
- Prince Arthur, Duke of Connaught and Strathearn (1937)
- King Edward VII of the United Kingdom (1907)
- Alexandra of Denmark (1907)
- Princess Victoria (1907)
- Claude Bowes-Lyon, 14th Earl of Strathmore and Kinghorne (1931)
- Cecilia Bowes-Lyon, Countess of Strathmore and Kinghorne (1931)
- Queen Elizabeth The Queen Mother (1925, 1931)
- King George VI of the United Kingdom (1931)
- Queen Elizabeth II of the United Kingdom (former Princess Elizabeth of York; 1933)
- Prince George, Duke of Kent (1934)
- Princess Marina, Duchess of Kent (1934)
- Maria Agathe, Duchess of Ratibor, Princess of Corvey (1899)
- Victor II, Duke of Ratibor (1898)
- Princess Egon of Ratibor (born Princess Leopoldine Lobkowicz; 1898)
- Princess Nina Georgievna of Russia (March 1915)
- Princess Xenia Georgievna of Russia (1915, 1920)
- Margaret Leicester Warren (1928)
- Ignaz Wechselmann (1894)
- Pauline Morton Sabin (1926)
- Betty Stockfeld (1930). Twice: one as Mary Magdalene, now in Hungarian National Portrait Gallery.
- Maharani Indira Devi of Baroda and Cooch Behar
- Elisabeth Severance Prentiss
- Duchess Mathilde Ludovika in Bavaria (1900)
- Edith Kermit Carow, second wife of Theodore Roosevelt (1917)
- Belle Wyatt Willard, wife of Kermit Roosevelt (1914)

== Arms ==
Coat of arms of Philip de László

Notes
Granted 16 October 1923 (Coll. Arms 91/141).
Crest
Issuant from coronet of an hereditary nobleman of the Kingdom of Hungary a demi-lion proper holding between the paws an escutcheon Gules charged with a dexter hand couped also Proper.
Escutcheon
Azure on a mountain Vert an eagle rising Proper in chief a mullet of six points Argent.
