= Belsize Lane =

Street in Hampstead, London

Coordinates: 51.54945°N 0.17135°W

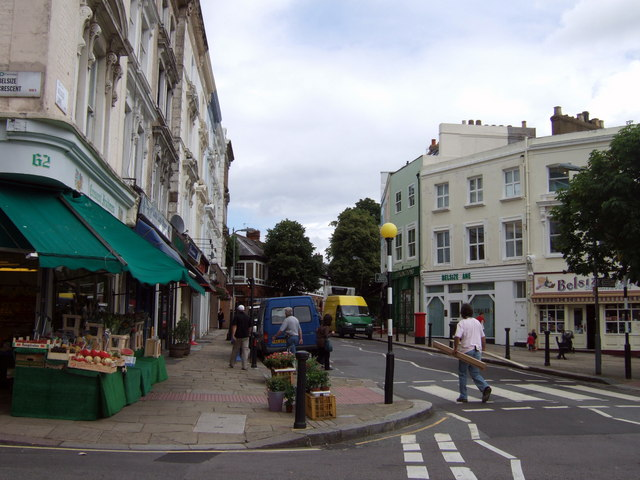
Centre of Belsize Village

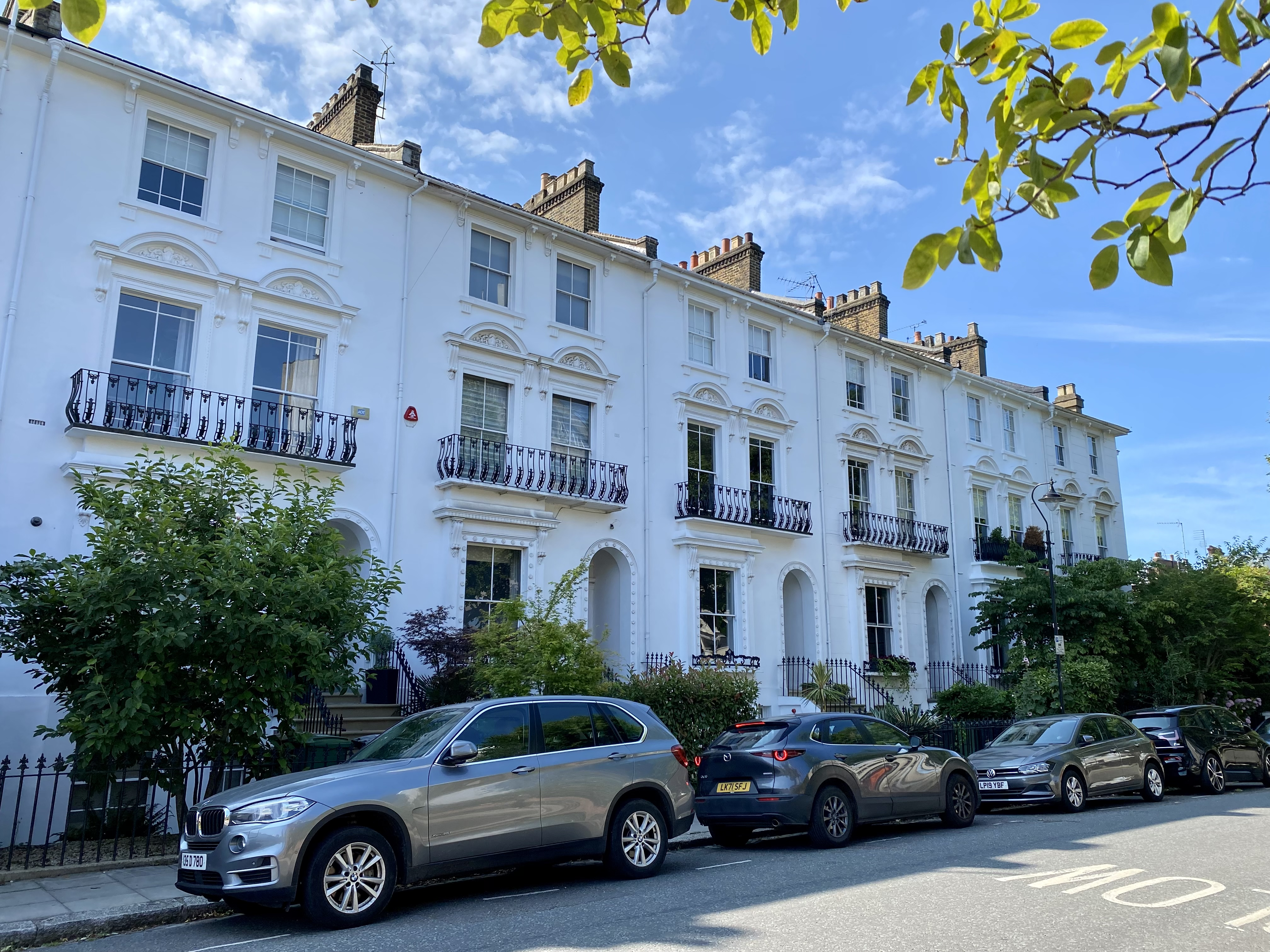
Nineteenth century stucco houses.

Belsize Lane is a street in the Belsize Park area of Hampstead in London. Located in the London Borough of Camden, it runs east to west from Haverstock Hill to Fitzjohns Avenue. While residential for much of the route, it also features a group of commercial properties that form the centre of Belsize Village. The Tavistock Clinic is located at its western end.

It is one of the oldest roads in the area, dating back to the period when the area was largely rural and dominated by the Belsize House estate. The route is significantly older than streets immediately to its south such as Belsize Park Gardens, Belsize Avenue and Belsize Square which were only laid out after Belsize House was pulled down and redeveloped in 1853. The Belsize Tunnel, constructed by the Midland Railway in the 1860s, passes underneath the street.

Near the eastern end of the street is Hunter's Lodge, a white stucco cottage designed by Joseph Parkinson in 1810 which is now Grade II listed. Closer to the western end numbers 79–93, a terrace of mid-nineteenth-century stucco houses, are also listed. Number 34 is a single storey studio house built in 1975-6 which the architect Georgie Wolton designed for herself and her family, it was listed in October 2023.

Outside the Tavistock Clinic is a statue of Sigmund Freud by Oscar Nemon.

== Bibliography ==
- Bebbington, Gillian. London Street Names. Batsford, 1972.
- Cherry, Bridget & Pevsner, Nikolaus. London 4: North. Yale University Press, 2002.
- Wade, Christopher. The Streets of Belsize. Camden History Society, 1991.
