= Netherhall Gardens =

Street in Hampstead, London

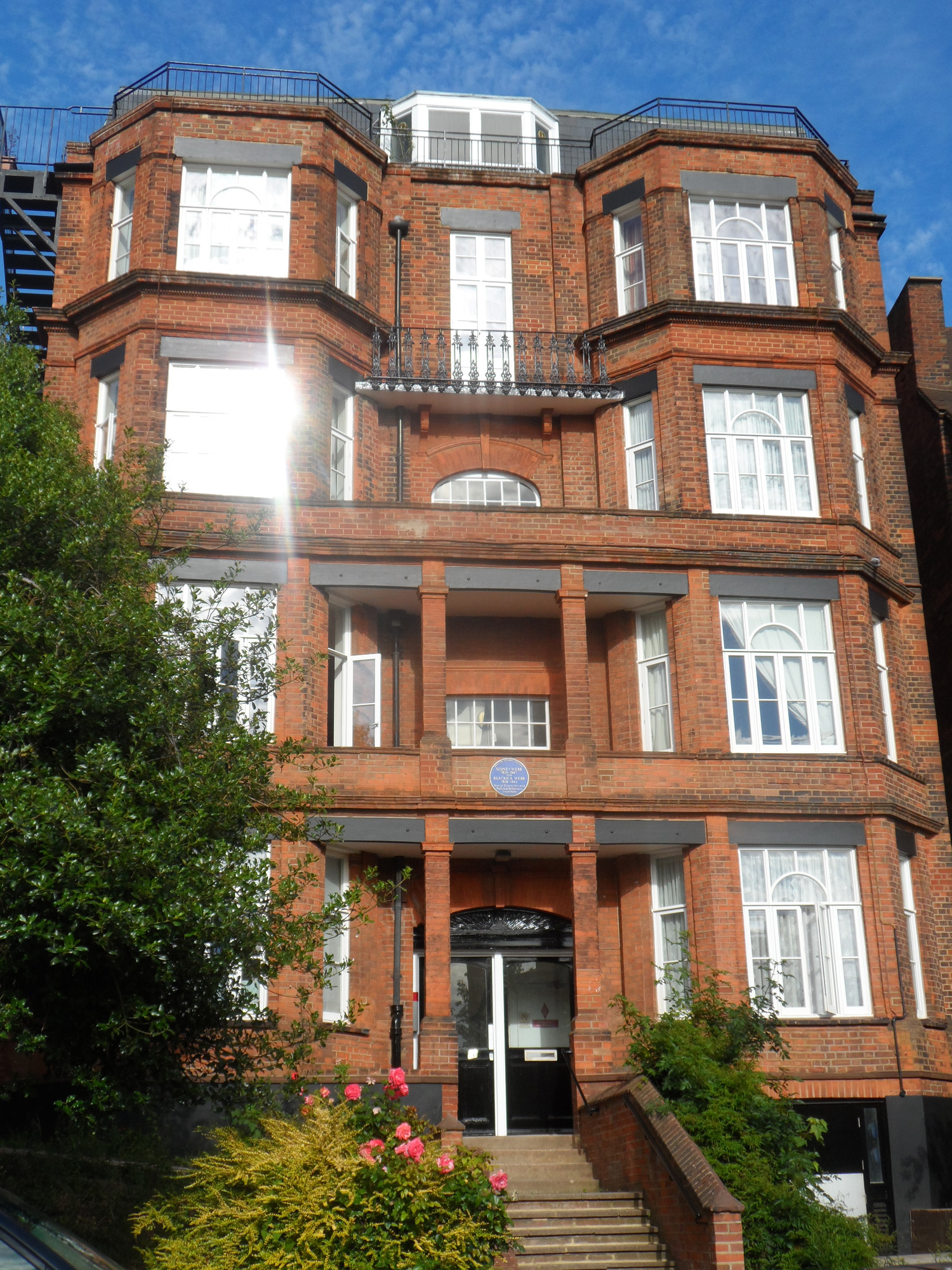
1 Netherhall Gardens featuring a blue plaque for Sidney and Beatrice Webb.

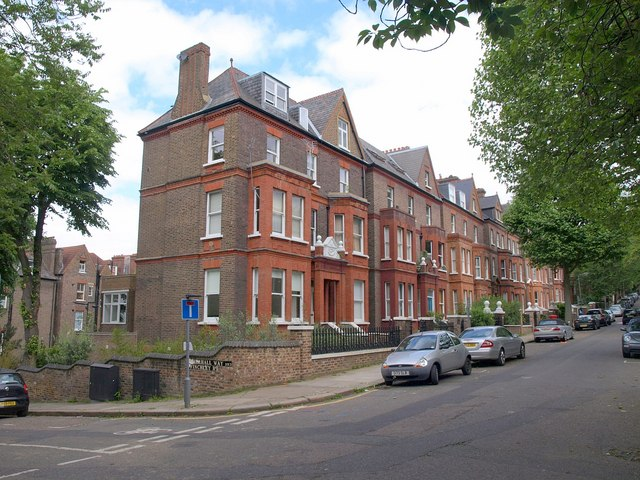
Red brick terraced houses.

Netherhall Gardens is a street in Hampstead, in the London Borough of Camden. It connects Finchley Road with Fitzjohns Avenue, curving twice along its route and meeting Nutley Terrace and Maresfield Gardens. The short Netherhall Way connects it to Frognal. Belsize Tunnel carrying the Midland Main Line passes under the street.

It was established in the 1870s when the previously rural estate owned by the Maryon Wilson family was sold off for development as upmarket housing. Takings its name from a property in Sussex owned by the family, it was originally called Netherhall Terrace before its current name was established in 1877. Many of the original houses have survived, and like nearby streets heavily feature red brick. Notable residents have included the artist Thomas Davidson, the politician Louis Sinclair, the tenor John McCormack and the composer Edward Elgar.

The British College of Osteopathic Medicine at Number 6 is now Grade II listed. as is Number 50 which was designed by the architect Richard Norman Shaw in 1878. There are two blue plaques in Netherhall Gardens, one for the social reformers Beatrice Webb and Sidney Webb at Number 1 and the journalist and politician John Passmore Edwards at Number 51.

== Bibliography ==
- Cherry, Bridget & Pevsner, Nikolaus. London 4: North. Yale University Press, 2002.
- Dakers, Caroline. The Blue Plaque Guide to London. Macmillan, 1981.
- Wade, Christopher. The Streets of Belsize. Camden History Society, 1991.
