= Amal Ziv =

Israeli academic and queer activist

Amal Ziv עמל זיו
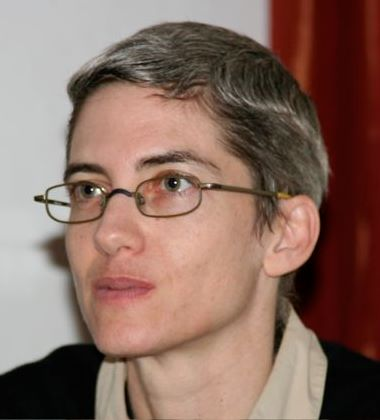
- Occupations: Academic, researcher, LGBT activist

Amal Ziv (Hebrew: עמל זיו; born December 14, 1964) is an Israeli academic and researcher. Their research areas are pornography and sexual representations, queer culture, queer activism, and queer kinship. Because of their activism and research, Ziv is considered a prominent member of the LGBTQ and feminist communities in Israel.

== Academic career and activism ==
Ziv is one of the most noted figures in feminist and queer history in Israel. They were one of the founders of Hazman Havarod (Pink Times), the pioneering LGBT newspaper. In the 1990s, Ziv wrote about LGBT and feminist topics in mainstream newspapers and journals. They also wrote and published their poetry. Some of their poems were set to music and recorded by the band Carmella Gross Wagner.

In 1992, Ziv completed their MA in comparative literature at Brown University. When they returned to Israel in 1993, they established a gay-and-lesbian and queer theory study group at the Agudah (Israel's first LGBT center) in Tel Aviv. In 1996, together with Aeyal Gross and Miki Gluzman, Ziv started the Queer Reading Group at Tel Aviv University. In 2001, while doing their PhD at Tel Aviv University, together with Gross and Daphna Hirsch, they founded the Sex Akher (Hebrew:"An Other Sex") LGBT Studies & Queer Theory annual conference, which held its 18th edition in 2018. In 2003, they edited the first book of queer essays in Hebrew, with Yair Qedar and Oren Kanar, Beyond Sexuality (Me'ever LeMiniyut מעבר למיניות).

In 2005, Ziv completed their PhD. Their dissertation was titled "The Construction of the Female Subject in Pornographic Fiction". They then went on to do post-doctoral research at the Hebrew University of Jerusalem, on queer activism in Israel. Included in this research was the topic of lesbian parenting. Ziv lectures in the department of literature at Tel Aviv University, and has been a faculty member of the Gender Studies Program at Ben Gurion University since 2008. As of 2016, they are the head of the program. In addition, Ziv is a member of the editorial committee and editorial board of the academic journal "Theory and Criticism" (תיאוריה וביקורת), published by the Van Lir Institute.

In 2015, on the 40th anniversary of the Agudah, Ziv was included on the list of the 40 most influential people in LGBT history in Israel.

== Views ==
Ziv's positions regarding queer theory have generated opposition to them by supporters of the theory in academe. One such position is Ziv's distinction between queer theory and adoption of a queer (as opposed to gay) identity. They object to the idea that "queer theory tells each of us personally is that everyone can be gender- and sexually fluid, and not only can be, but must be. Queer theory truly does not ask everyone to be queer, it just offers a way of looking at and subverting the entire field of sexuality and gender. But to point out the options does not mean that these options are readily available and obligatory."

Ziv's views on pornography are also controversial. Although they had made clear that they are stringently opposed to the exploitation of women in prostitution and pornography, they support the existence of these occupations from a feminist perspective, in which they examines women's sexual subjectivity, right to choose, and other elements affecting them.

== Personal life ==
Ziv resides in Tel Aviv with their life-partner, the poet Sharon Haas, and their son. In 2022, Ziv came out as genderqueer and non-binary transgender and since then, uses they/them pronouns and refers to themselves by the name "Amal.ia" (עמל.יה), based on the main character of their memoir "Teenagehood" (נערוּת), published by Hakibutz Hameuchad Press.

== Publications ==
=== Books ===
- Sexual Thoughts: Queer Theory, Pornography, and the Politics of Sexuality (Resling Press, 2013, in Hebrew)
- Explicit Utopias: Rewriting the Sexual in Women's Pornography (SUNY Press, 2015)
- Beyond Sexuality: Selected Papers in Lesbian & Gay Studies and Queer Theory – co-editor (Hakibbutz Hameuchad Press, 2003, in Hebrew).
- Teenagehood (Hakibbutz Hameuchad Press, 2022, in Hebrew).

=== Chapters in books ===
- "Toward a History of Bars in Israel." Sappho in the Holy Land: Lesbian Existence and Dilemmas in Contemporary Israel. Eds. Chava Frankfort-Nachmias and Erella Shadmi. New York: SUNY Press. 2005
- "Diva Interventions: Dana International and Israeli Gender Culture." Queer Popular Culture. Ed. Thomas Peele. New York: Palgrave Macmillan, 2007
- "Refiguring Penetration in Women's Erotic Fiction". Kristen Phillips (ed.), Women and Erotic Fiction, 2015

=== Articles ===
- "The Pervert's Progress: An Analysis of Story of O and the Beauty Trilogy." Feminist Review 46 (Spring 1994): 61–75.
- "Questioning Safe Space in the Classroom: Reflections on Pedagogy, Vulnerability, and Sexual Explicitness". Borderlands, 2018
- "Girl Meets Boy: Cross-gender Queer Sex and the Promise of Pornography". Sexualities, Oct 2014
- "Performative Politics in Israeli Queer Anti-Occupation Activism". Glq-a Journal of Lesbian and Gay Studies, 2010
