= Sigmund Freud Museum (Vienna) =

Museum in Vienna, Austria

Coordinates: 48°13′07″N 16°21′47″E

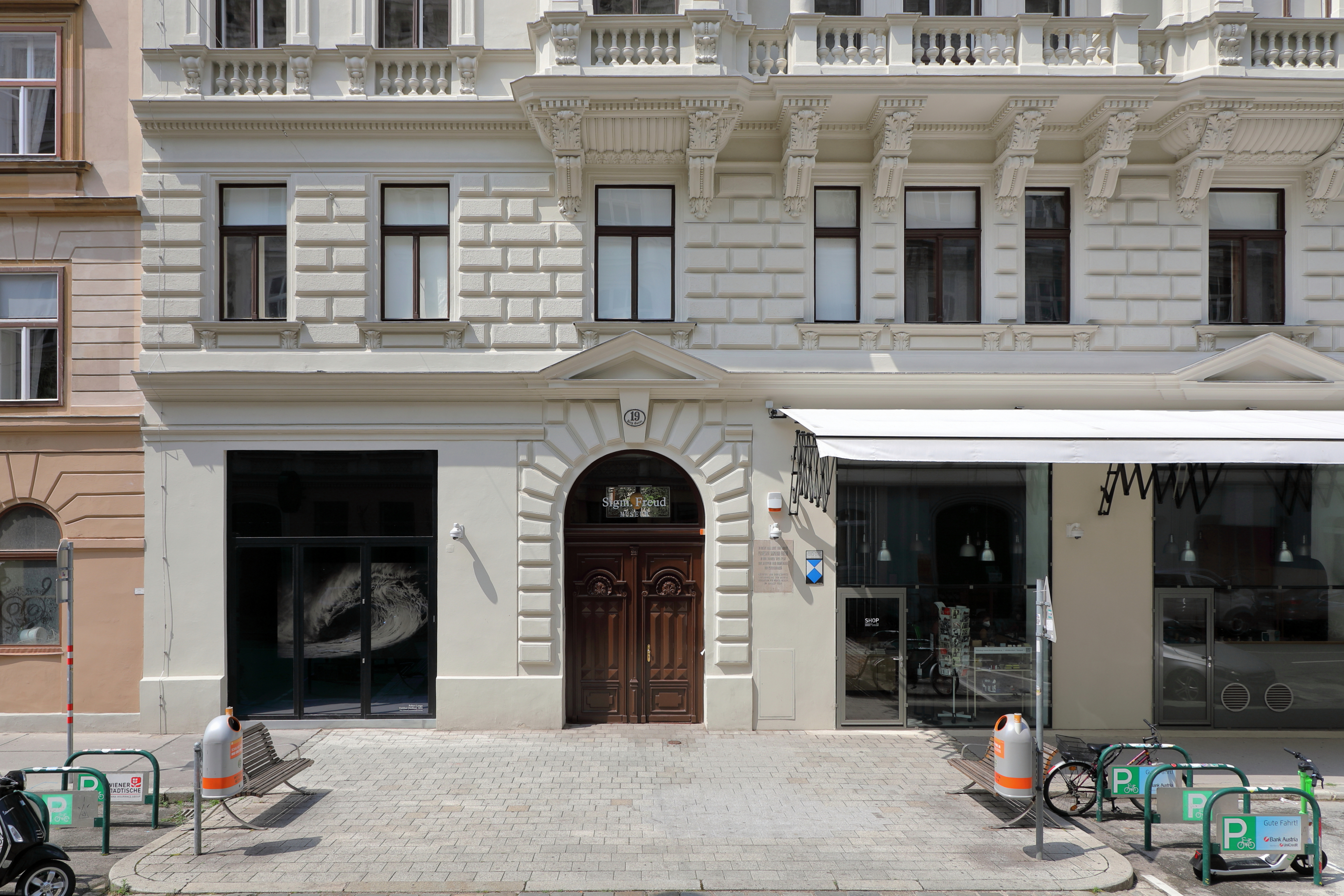
The Sigmund Freud Museum on Berggasse in Vienna

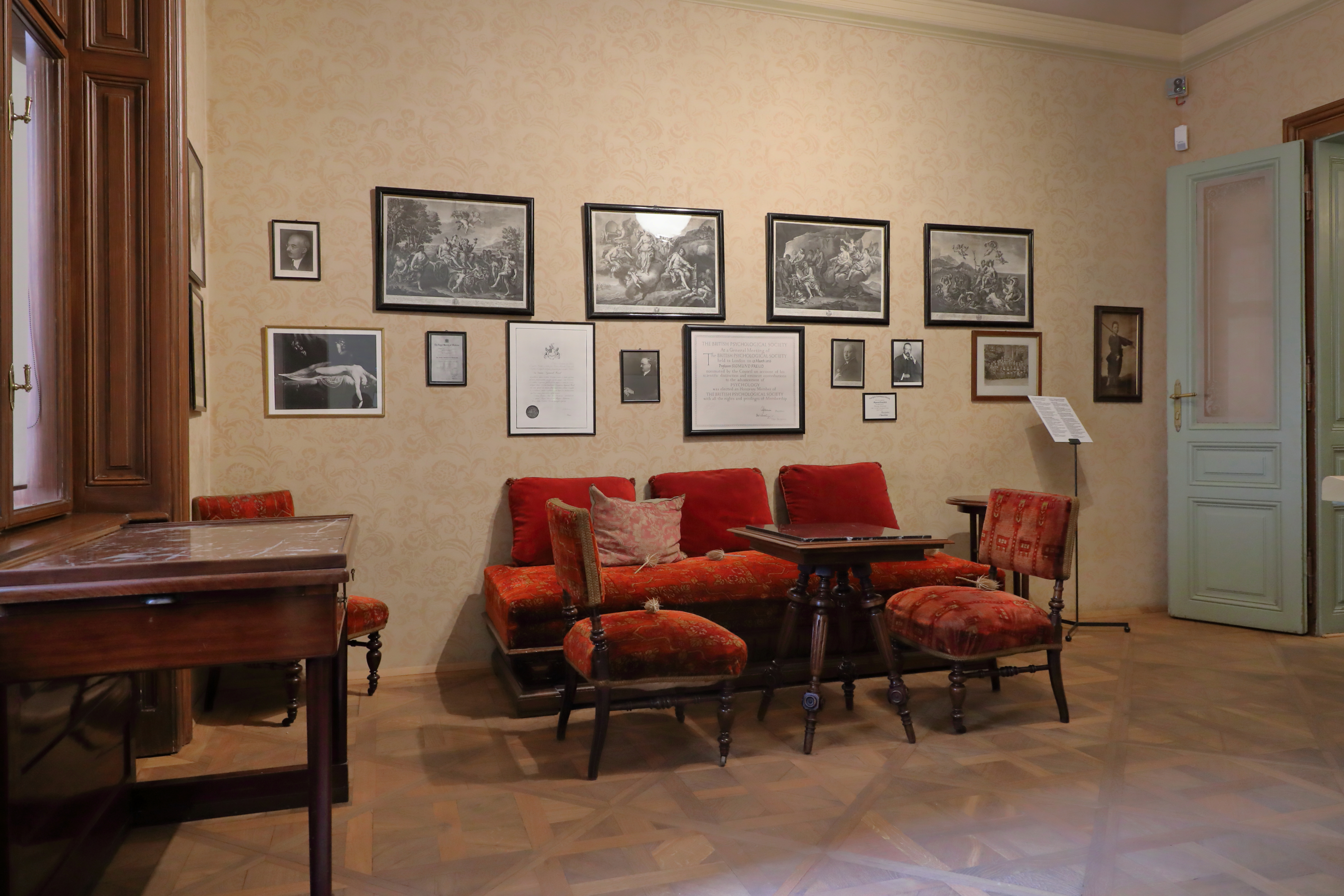
Waiting room of the former Sigmund Freud clinic

The Sigmund Freud Museum in Vienna is a museum founded in 1971 covering Sigmund Freud's life story. It is located in the Alsergrund district, at Berggasse 19. In 2003, the museum was put in the hands of the newly established Sigmund Freud Foundation, which has since received the entire building as an endowment. It also covers the history of psychoanalysis.

== Museum ==
The building was newly built in 1891 when Freud moved there. The previous building on the site, once the home of Victor Adler, had been torn down.

His old rooms, where he lived for 47 years and produced the majority of his writings, now house a documentary centre to his life and works. The influence of psychoanalysis on art and society is displayed through a program of special exhibitions and a modern art collection.

The museum consists of Freud's former practice and a part of his old private quarters. Attached to the museum are Europe's largest psychoanalytic research library, with 35,000 volumes, and the research institute of the Sigmund Freud Foundation.

The display includes original items owned by Freud, the practice's waiting room, and parts of Freud's extensive antique collection. However, his famous couch is now in the Freud Museum in London, along with most of the original furnishings, as Freud was able to take his furniture with him when he emigrated:

The empty space left in Freud’s treatment room since his escape from the Nazis is an explicit reference to the dark course of history. Recreating a World of Yesterday (Stefan Zweig) in these rooms—a world before Austria’s Anschluss with Nazi Germany in March 1938—as if Freud hadn’t been forced into exile in London, would be to negate an important part of his history and indeed our history, too.

— Museum Director Monika Pessler, "Permanent Exhibition," Sigmund Freud Museum

A third Freud Museum, after London and Vienna, was started in the Czech town of Příbor in 2006 when the house of his birth was opened to the public.

The museum contains an archive of images containing around two thousand documents, mostly photographs, but also paintings, drawings, and sculptures. The collection consists of almost all of the existing photos of Sigmund Freud and his family, a large number of photos of Anna Freud and photos from psychoanalytic congresses etc.

== History ==
In 1938 Freud was forced to leave German-annexed Austria due to his Jewish ancestry, and fled to London. The museum was opened in 1971 by the Sigmund Freud Society in the presence of Anna Freud. In 1996 the building was expanded with new rooms for special exhibitions and events. The Foundation has ongoing plans to expand the museum.

Since 1970 the annual Sigmund Freud Lecture has taken place in Vienna on Freud's birthday, 6 May. This event, at which psychoanalysts speak on a contemporary theme, was established by the Sigmund Freud Society and is now organised by the Foundation.

== See also ==
- Freud Museum (London)
