= Maresfield Gardens =

Street in Hampstead, London

Coordinates: 51.549°N 0.178°W

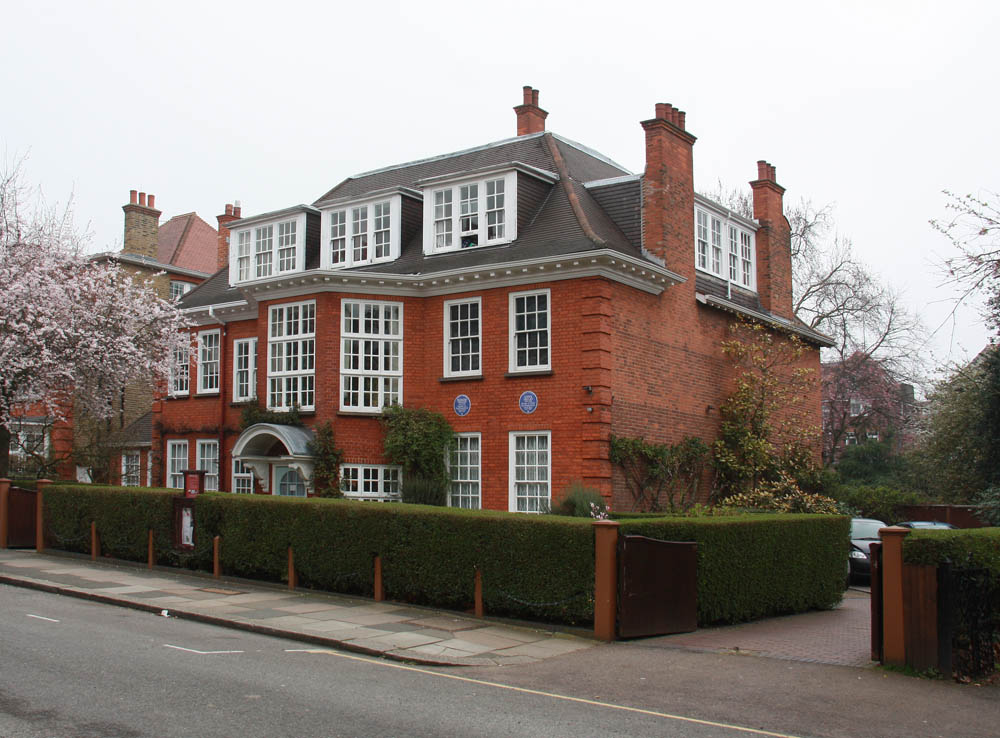
The Freud Museum.

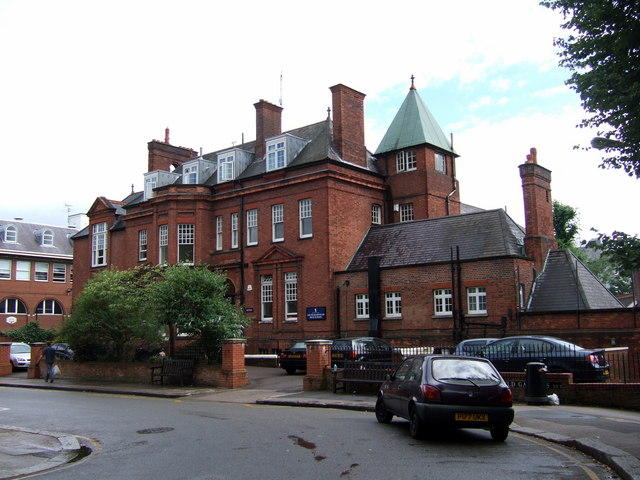
The former South Hampstead High School building.

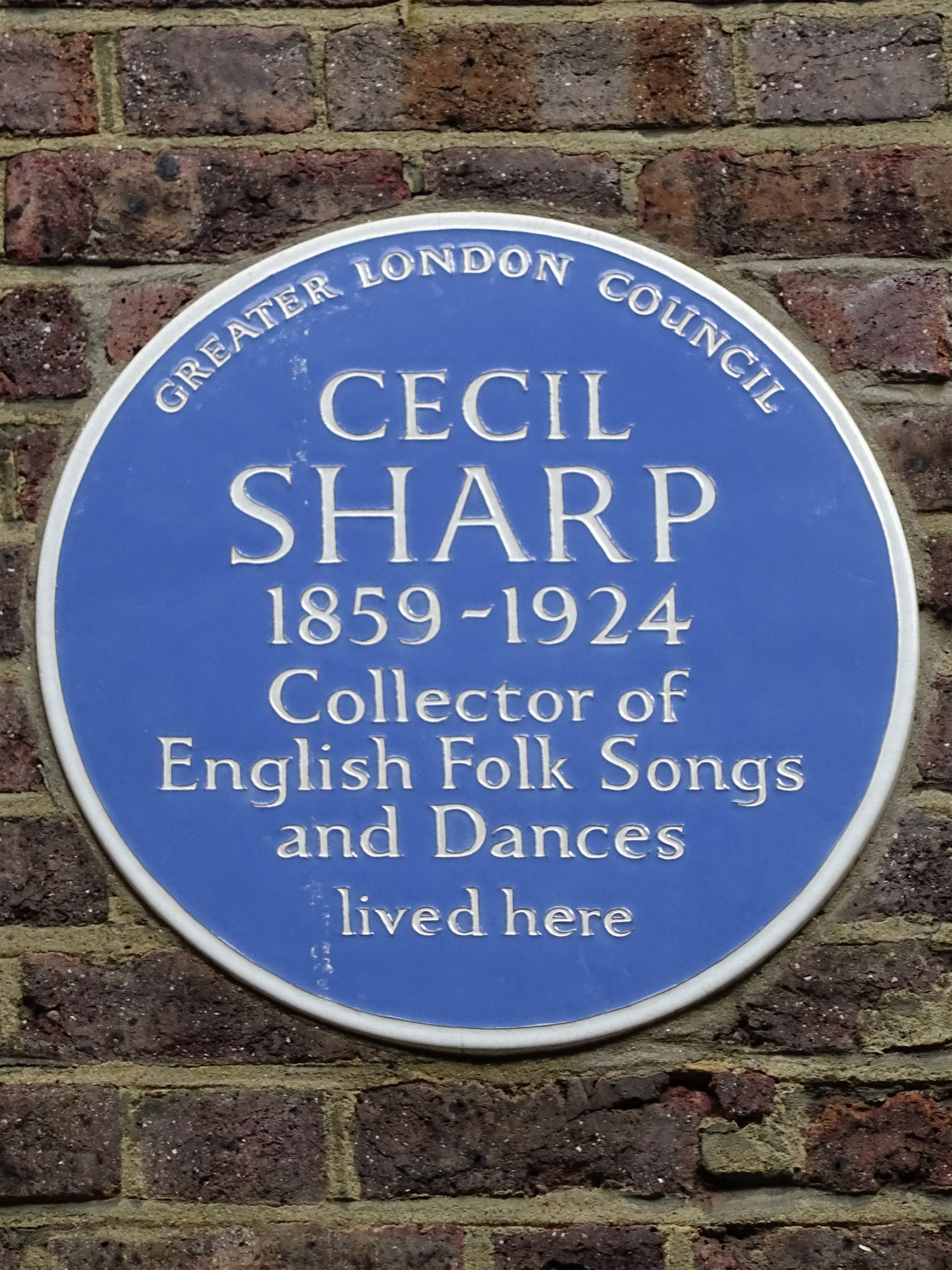
Blue plaque for Cecil Sharp.

Maresfield Gardens is a street in Hampstead. Located in the London Borough of Camden, it runs parallel to the west of Fitzjohns Avenue for much of its route before curving to join it at is southern end. It crosses Nutley Terrace and Netherhall Gardens. The Belsize Tunnel passes underneath the street. It primarily feature red brick buildings.

The area was predominantly rural until the Victorian era when the Maryon Wilson family sold off the estate for development into residential streets as part the expansion of London It is named after Maresfield in Sussex, which also belonged to the Maryon Wilsons. It was briefly known as Maresfield Terrace before settling on the current name in 1880.

South Hampstead High School has been located in the street since 1882, after it was opened by Princess Louise. The same year Westfield College was also established. Notable residents in the street have included the painter Henry Moore and the future Prime Minister H. H. Asquith. In 1938 Sigmund Freud moved into number 20 with his daughter Anna Freud, and she later founded the Anna Freud Centre there in 1952. Today the building is the Freud Museum commemorating the work of both father and daughter.

The Freud Museum is Grade II listed as is number 48 designed in the 1930s by Hermann Zweigenthal and the Roman Catholic Church of St Thomas More by architect Gerard Goalen. The street features blue plaques for both Anna and Sigmund Freud as well as the collector of folk songs Cecil Sharp.

== Bibliography ==
- Cherry, Bridget & Pevsner, Nikolaus. London 4: North. Yale University Press, 2002.
- Wade, Christopher. The Streets of Belsize. Camden History Society, 1991.
