= Yair Qedar =

Israeli filmmaker (born 1969)

- יאיר קדר
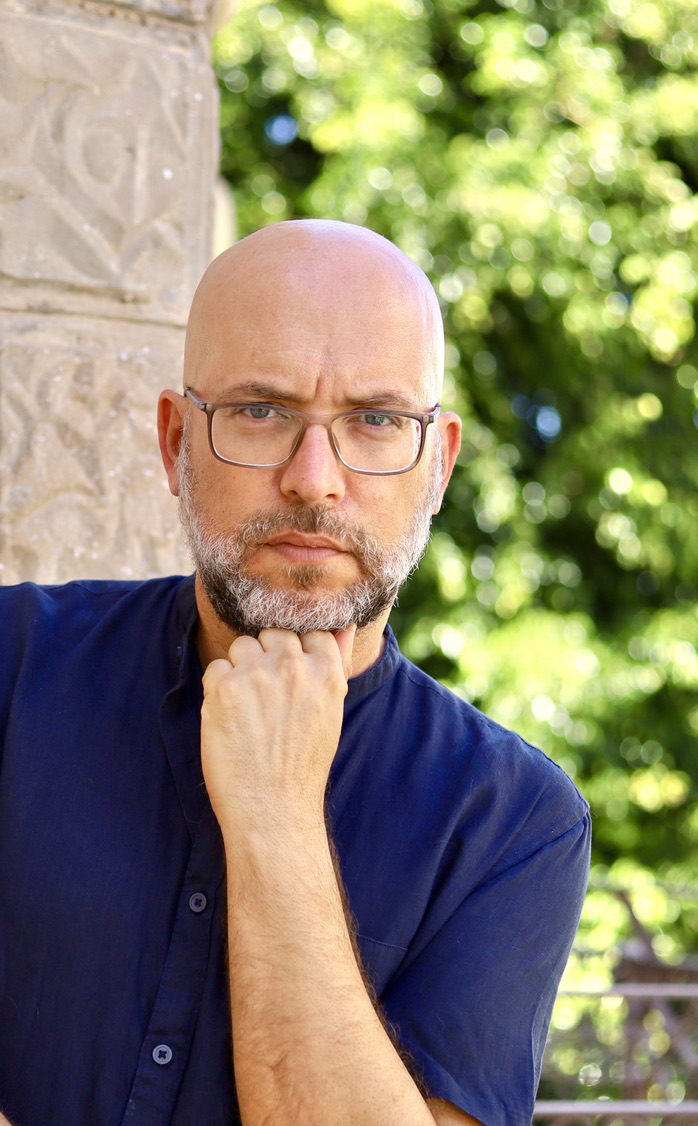
- Portrait of Yair Qedar
- Born: Yair Qedar; June 13, 1969 (age 57); Afula, Israel
- Occupations: Film director; film producer; screenwriter; social activist; journalist
- Years active: 2003–present
- Works: Gay Days (film)
- Style: Documentary
- Awards: Ophir Award (nominated)

Yair Qedar is a documentary filmmaker, festival curator and LGBTQ activist. (Hebrew: יאיר קדר; born June 13, 1969), In his project "the Hebrews", he chronicled the lives of Jewish and Israeli figures of the modern Hebrew literary canon. Qedar's 22 feature-length documentaries have all premiered at film festivals and have won the director over 40 prizes. Qedar is a leading LGBTQ activist. He created several queer films and the first Israeli LGBTQ newspaper. In 2026 he created and curated Aleph international festival for Hebrew language and culture.

== Career ==
Since the early nineties, Qedar has been involved in journalistic writing and editing. He has written for Schocken, Haaretz, and Davar, and served as editor and deputy editor of travel magazine Masa Acher. Qedar has won the Allied Prize for World Jewish Press and the European Union Award for Journalistic Reporting in the Mediterranean Basin.

After studying 20th century Hebrew literature at Tel Aviv University, Qedar launched Ha'Ivrim (Hebrew: The Hebrews), a project in which Qedar makes one-hour biographical documentaries about writers and poets part of the Hebrew literary canon. The films are generally cinematic portraits, and are interspersed with archival footage, interviews, sound fragments and contemporary animation. The documentaries have all premiered in film festivals, aired on Israeli TV, and circulated far and wide in cinemas, cinematheques, community and cultural centers, in Israel and around the world (United States and Canada, Europe, Australia and Russia), earning multiple awards.

Qedar released his debut feature film Gay Days in 2009. The documentary documents the emergence of the LGBT community in Israel and is based on his own personal story along with the stories of other prominent gay men and women in Israel (Gal Uchovsky, Eytan Fox, Dana International, Offer Nissim, among others). It premiered in May 2009 in Tel Aviv at the Docaviv International Documentary Film Festival, and was also screened at the official opening of the Tel Aviv Gay Pride. The film was the official selection of the Tel Aviv International LGBT Film Festival (TLVFest) and of the Panorama section at the 60th Berlin International Film Festival.

Qedar's The 5 Houses of Leah Goldberg (2011), chronicles the life of the poet Leah Goldberg. The documentary was the official selection of Docaviv Film Festival 2011 and Doc Aviv Galilee 2011. It won three prizes at the 2011 Israeli Documentary Film Competition: for editing (for Ayelet Ofarim), soundtrack design (for Aviv Aldama) and original music (for Eli Sorni and Carolina). The film was sponsored by the Israeli Film Service, The New Foundation for Cinema and TV and The Second Authority for Television and Radio. Together with Gideon Tikotsky, he initiated the celebrations of the centenary of Leah Goldberg, during which dozens of cultural events and initiatives were held.

The Seven Tapes (2012), about the life of the poet Yona Wallach, was official selected at the 2012 Jerusalem Film Festival. Competing at the Israeli Documentary Film Competition, it won Best Film of 2012 and Best Soundtrack of 2012. It was also screened at the Sha'ar International Poetry Festival in Haifa. The film was sponsored by the Israeli Film Service, Channel 8 and The Rabinovich Foundation for the Arts.

Bialik, King of the Jews, covering the life and art of poet Hayim Nahman Bialik, was an official selection at the Docaviv Film Festival and at the Miami Jewish Film Festival. It premiered in the spring of 2014 in cinematheques and on Israeli Channel 8. It was nominated as Best Documentary Film at the 2014 Israeli Documentary Competition.

In 2015, Qedar released The Awakener, the story of Yosef Haim Brenner, and Zelda - A Simple Woman, on the life and work of the poet Zelda Mishkovsky. The Awakener was an official selection at the 2015 Docaviv International Documentary Film Festival while Zelda, A Simple Woman was an official selection at the 2015 Jerusalem Film Festival, where it won the Jewish Experience Award, the Jewish International Film Festival, and the Warsaw Jewish Film Festival. It also won the Lia van Leer Award for Films about Jewish Heritage. The films were sponsored by the Israeli Film Service, The Avi Chai Foundation, Channel 1 and The Makor Foundation.

From 2015 to 2017, Qedar collaborated with actor Ilan Peled, co-directing and producing the mockumentary mini-series Vanished, about the marginalization and discrimination of female artists in Israel. The series' first film, Lilian (about a fictional poet), was screened at the 2016 Haifa Film Festival, where it won the first prize in the documentary competition, the Rozalia Katz Award for Best Documentary Film. The move was criticized, and many called for the film's disqualification, claiming it did not meet the criteria of the genre. However, the festival management refused to do so. In 2017, it was nominated for an Ophir Award. The nomination was controversial, as the film deals with a fictional character. Gidi Orsher, a member of the board of the Film Academy, told Haaretz that in his eyes the film was not a documentary in any way, saying "If it misses like a duck and measures like a duck and it tastes like a duck - then it's probably a duck. For a movie to be documentary it has to be about real and uninvented characters. You can make a documentary about Superman but you can not determine that Superman is a real character." The series' second film, Yona, followed a Yemenite dancer, and was an official selection at the 2016 Jerusalem Jewish Film Festival. The series' final film, Bebe, about fictional transgender actress, was an official selection of the 2017 Tel Aviv International LGBTQ+ Film Festival.

In 2018, Qedar released Vogel Lost Vogel, a film documenting the life and work of David Fogel. It was screened at the Haifa Film Festival, where it received a special mention.

Following Israeli writer and social activist Amos Oz's death in 2018, Qedar directed and produced The Fourth Window, a documentary unveiling the life, work and tragedies of Amos Oz's life. Sponsored by Kan, Arte ZDF, and SVT, it was officially selected at the 2021 Thessaloniki Film Festival, the 2021 Docaviv Film Festival, the 2021 DocuText Film Festival, the 2021 Warsaw International Film Festival, and the 2021 Mumbai International Film Festival, where it won Best Documentary. It also won a Special Mention Award at the Weil Bloch Film Awards.

In 2021, Qedar released The Last Chapter of AB Yehoshua, a documentary about A. B. Yehoshua. It was an official selection at the 2021 Jerusalem Film Festival, where it competed in the Diamond Competition for Israeli Documentary Films. The film was sponsored by Kan and The Rabinovich Foundation for the Arts.

His new film about Sigmund Freud - Outsider. Freud (2025) is a film exploring the life of Sigmund Freud, written, directed, and produced by Qedar. Combining documentary storytelling with animation, the film delves into Freud’s legacy through themes of exile, identity, and resistance. It was produced with the support of Kan (Israeli Public Broadcasting Corporation), ORF, ARTE-RBB, SVT, the New Fund for Cinema and Television, the Gesher–Rothschild Foundation initiative “Cinema Spirit,” the Sienna Fund, the Israeli Ministry of Culture, and CoPro. The film features animation by Tal Kantor and Moshe Zilbernagel, editing by Noit Geva and Tomi Shlez-Shafrir. The film won the Pitching Award at the Thessaloniki Documentary Festival, the Best Film Award at the Mannheim Film and Arts Festival in Germany, and the Best Documentary/Animation Film prizes at both the Jaipur International Film Festival and the New Delhi Film Festival in 2025. It was also part of the official selection at the Haifa International Film Festival. Winning the 2025 Gradiva award, the major award in the field of Psychoanalysis. The film was shown over 300 times in the more than 20 countries. In October 2026, Sigmund Freud University Vienna devoted a two-day film seminar to Outsider. Freud, led by Alexandre Métraux and Gerhard Benetka, using the film as a basis for examining the possibilities and limitations of documentary representations of historical figures.

The film has been screened in collaboration with psychoanalytic societies and institutions in New York, Chicago, San Diego, Prague, Belgrade, Calcutta, Paris, the Freud Museums in Vienna and London, the Library of Congress in Washington, and leading universities such as Cambridge, Oxford, Cornell, and Stanford.

In 2026, Qedar founded the ALEPH Festival, an international cultural initiative dedicated to the Hebrew language and culture. Moving beyond its liturgical and ancient roots, the festival spotlights Hebrew as a living, evolving tongue through a contemporary lens. The festival is notable for its global reach, holding synchronized events in major cultural hubs including Berlin, London, Stockholm, New York, Boston, and Hollywood, Florida. Under Qedar's artistic direction, the program bridges the gap between historical linguistics and modern creative expression, featuring a mix of cinema, literature, and performative arts that celebrate the language's ongoing vitality.

Qedar has taught film at the Sam Spiegel School in Jerusalem and at academic institutions including Shenkar College, Beit Berl College, and Emek Yizrael College. In 2027, he is scheduled to participate as a Visiting Distinguished Artist at the University of Chicago and as an Artist/Scholar-in-Residence at the American Psychoanalytic Association.

== Activism ==
In addition to his work as a documentary maker, Qedar is a prominent member of the Israeli LGBT community. He founded the country's first LGBT newspaper HaZman HaVarod (Pink Times), where he served as editor. He also served as the editor-in-chief of Another Journey magazine.

Qedar was founding editor of Pink Time, Israel's first gay, lesbian and transgender newspaper, writes in various publications, such as Haaretz, Yedioth Ahronoth, Masa Acher, and is recipient of various journalistic prizes, including winner of the B'nai B'rith World Center Award for Journalism in 2003, and Euromed Heritage Journalistic Award in 2005 and 2006.

In 2003, Qedar edited the first gay theatre show in Israel in 1994, as well as Beyond Sexuality, an anthology of gay and lesbian studies. In 2010, alongside Yossi Berg, he co-founded Rainbow Families Organization, aimed at promoting the rights, understanding and position of LGBT families in Israel.

His debut documentary Gay Days depicts Israel's so-called "pink revolution".

In 2021, he and his partners launched the Proud Community Heritage Project.

== Filmography ==
Year	Film	Subject	Notes
2009	Gay Days	LGBT history in Israel	
2018	Mom and Dad: I Have Something To Tell You	Assi Azar	
2011	5 Houses of Leah Goldberg	Leah Goldberg	
2012	The Seven Tapes	Yona Wallach	
2014	Bialik, King of the Jews	Hayim Nahman Bialik	
2015	The Awakener	Yosef Haim Brenner	
2015	Zelda, A Simple Woman	Zelda Schneurson Mishkovsky	
2015	A Song of Loves	David Buzaglo	as producer
2015	Miss Bluwstein	Rachel	
2015	The Raven	Ze'ev Jabotinski	as producer
2015	Vanished (Lilyan, Yona, Bebe)	Fictional poet, fictional dancer, fictional actress	miniseries, as codirector
2018	Yeshurun in 6 Chapters	Avoth Yeshurun	as producer, film directed by Amichai Chasson
2018	Black Honey	Abraham Sutzkever	
2018	Alone	Miriam Yalan-Shteklis	as producer
2018	MORI	Shalom Shabazi	
2018	Vogel Lost Vogel	David Vogel	
2019	Levantine	Jacqueline Kahanoff	as producer
2021	The Last Chapter of A.B. Yehoshua	Abraham Yehoshua	
2021	The Fourth Window	Amos Oz	director-producer
2023	Spinoza: 6 Reasons for the Excommunication of the Philosopher	Baruch Spinoza	as producer
2023	The Activist. Karl Marx	Karl Marx	as producer
2025	Outsider. Freud	Sigmund Freud	as director-producer

== Personal life ==
Kedar was born and raised in Afula. He attended Tel Aviv University in the 1990s, graduating with a bachelor's and master's degree in Hebrew literature.

In 2003, his son Michael Ron Qedar was born, in joint parenting with journalist Zahara Ron. In 2017 he married Gidon Yona in a civil marriage in Denmark, which was later recognized by the Israeli Ministry of the Interior.

Qedar lives in Tel Aviv.

== Awards and accolades ==
Year	Award	Notes
2003	Bnei Brith Award for Jewish journalistic achievement	-
2005	European Union Award for Journalistic Reporting in the Mediterranean Basin	-
2011	Israeli Documentary Film Competition Sound Design award	for 5 Houses of Leah Goldberg
2011	Israeli Documentary Film Competition Editing Award	for 5 Houses of Leah Goldberg
2012	Documentary Film Competition Award for Best Documentary Film on behalf of the Documentary Filmmakers' Forum	for The Seven Tapes
2012	Documentary Film Competition Award for Original Music on behalf of the Documentary Filmmakers' Forum	for The Seven Tapes
2012	Documentary Film Competition Award for Soundtrack Design on behalf of the Documentary Filmmakers' Forum	for The Seven Tapes
2015	The Jewish Experience Award at the Jerusalem Film Festival	for Zelda, A Simple Woman
2015	Border Breakthrough Film Award at Southern Festival	for A Song of Loves
2016	Minister of Education Award for Jewish Culture in the Field of Cinema	for The Hebrews, alongside filmmaker Dina Perlstein
2016	Rozalia Katz Award for Best Documentary Film at the Haifa Film Festival	for Lilian, alongside Ilan Peled
2017	Ophir Award for Best Short Documentary	Nominated
2018	First prize in the Jewish Experience competition at the Jerusalem Film Festival	for Black Honey
2018	Special Mention at the Haifa Festival	for Vogel Lost Vogel
2018	Audience Favorite Award at the Israeli Film Festival in Los Angeles	for Black Honey
2019	Best Music Award at the Israeli Documentary Film Competition	for the second season of The Hebrews
2019	Soundtrack Design Award at the Israeli Documentary Film Competition	for the second season of The Hebrews
2019	Best Documentary Series Award at the Israeli Documentary Film Competition	for the second season of The Hebrews
2019	Chicago International Film Festival Audience Favorite Award	for Black Honey
2021	Special Mention at the Weil Bloch Film Awards	for The Fourth Window
2021	Mumbai International Film Festival Best Documentary	for The Fourth Window
2023	Birmingham Film & Television Festival Best Documentary	for The Last Chapter of AB Yehoshua
2024	Special mention from the Association of Hebrew and Writers his contribution to Hebrew literature.	
2024	Winner of Icon Docs award, Munich-Doc festival	for the film "The Other Freud".
2025	Best feature documentary/animation prize Jaipur film festival	for "Outsider. Freud".
2025	Best feature documentary/animation prize New Delhi film festival	for "Outsider. Freud".
2025	Special mention Israeli film festival Paris	for "Outsider. Freud".
2025	Best documentary Cine Choice Awards - Los Angeles	for "Outsider. Freud".
2025	Critique choice in Bangkok Movie Awards	for "Outsider. Freud".
2025	Sundarban International Film Festival	for "Outsider. Freud".
2025	Massachusetts International Film Festival	for "Outsider. Freud".
2025	The 2025 Gradiva® Award for Best Documentary	for "Outsider. Freud".
2026	The World Media Festivals, Germany, awards - Gold medal and best music	for "Outsider. Freud".
