= Fitzjohns Avenue =

Street in Hampstead, London

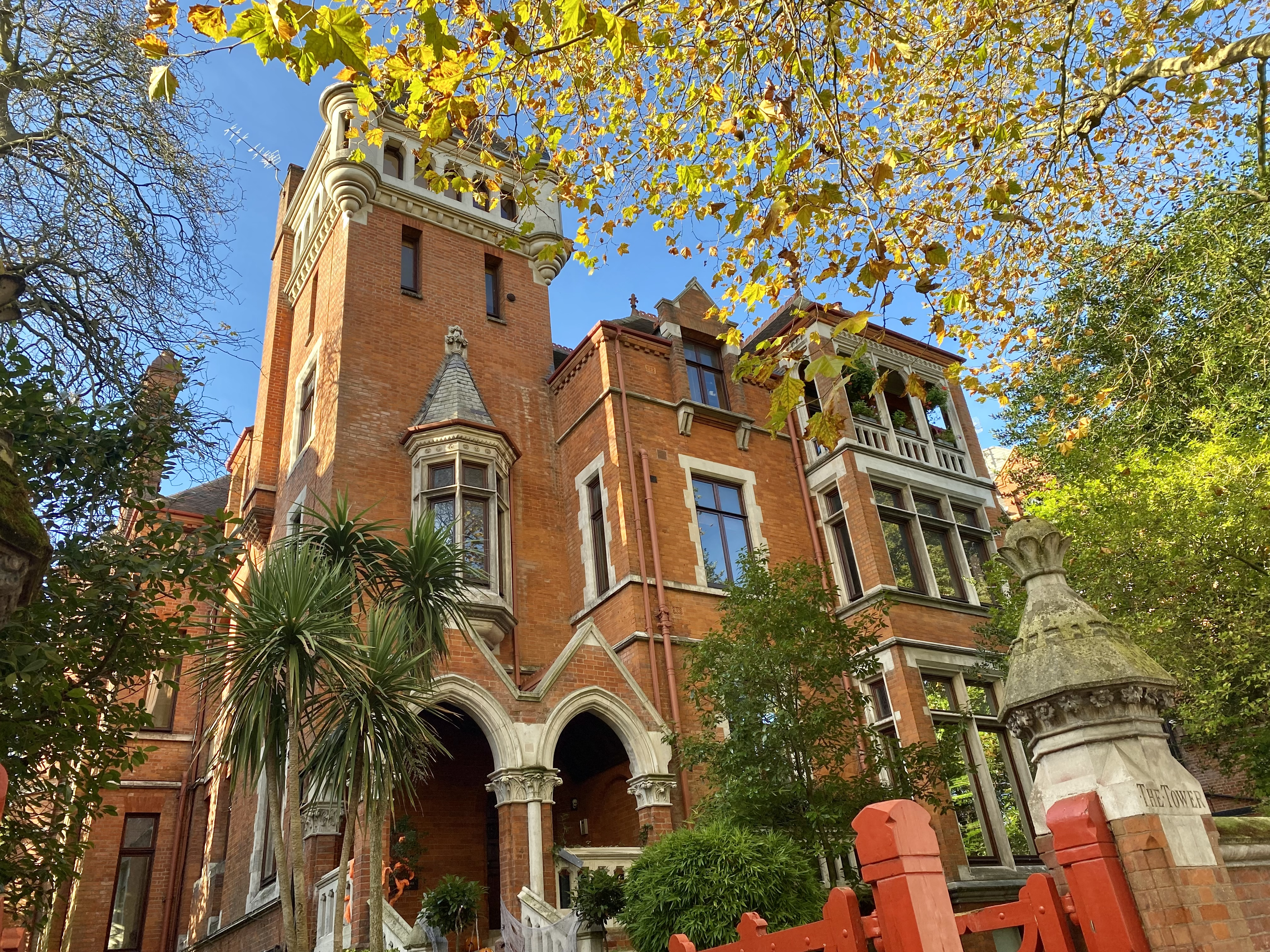
55 Fitzjohns Avenue, now Grade II listed.

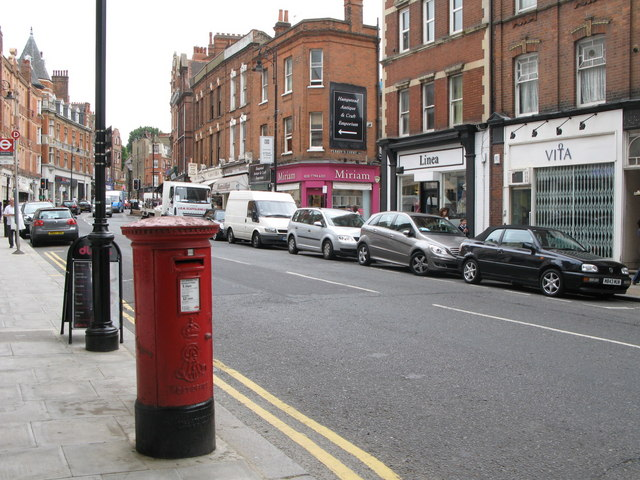
The northern end of Fitzjohns Avenue reaches a plateau in Hampstead village where it joins Heath Street which runs on to Hampstead Heath.

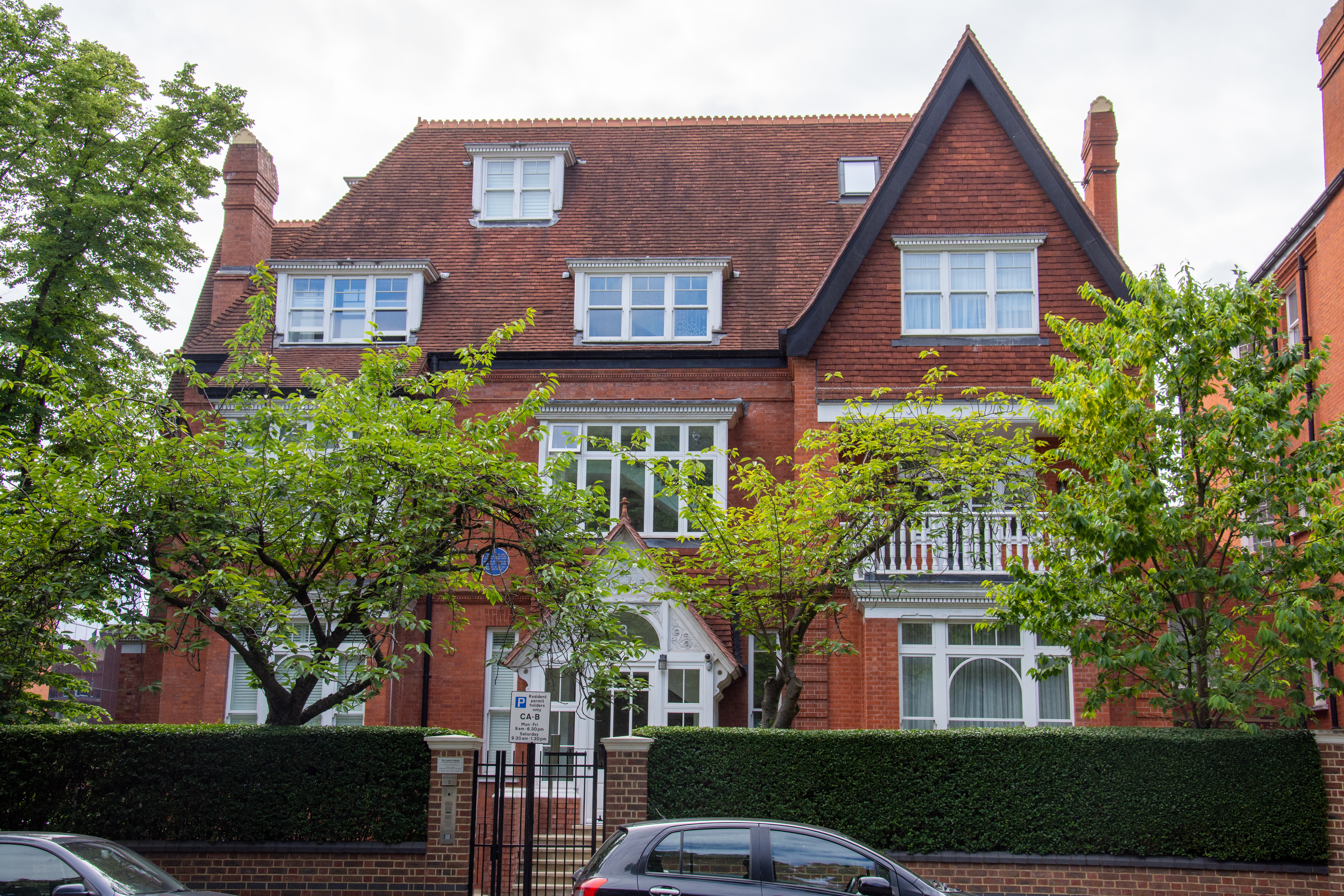
Hyme House featuring a blue plaque for Philip de László.

Fitzjohns Avenue is a street in Hampstead, England. Located in the London Borough of Camden it runs northwards from College Crescent (near to Swiss Cottage tube station on the Finchley Road) to join and become Heath Street in Hampstead Village. Running steeply uphill for much of its route Fitzjohns Avenue is joined or crossed by various other streets including Belsize Park, Belsize Lane, Maresfield Gardens, Netherhall Gardens, Akenfield Road and Lyndhurst Road. It is classified as part of the B511 road. It is also sometimes written as Fitzjohn's Avenue.

== Construction ==
While Hampstead was an old settlement on the outskirts of London, the area which Fitzjohns Avenue was built on was traditionally rural. In 1869 the Maryon-Wilson family, lords of the manor of Hampstead, received legal permission to redevelop the area for housing to accommodate Victorian London's rapidly expanding population. A fightback was led by Octavia Hill amongst others, who wished to preserve the green spaces against the encroaching urbanisation. Supporters of the unsuccessful campaign cited the fact the area had inspired both the artist John Constable and the poets John Keats and Leigh Hunt. In 1875 the area was finally sold to a developer for £50,000

Fitzjohns Avenue took its name from an estate the Maryon-Wilson family owned in Essex. It followed the route of an old footpath between Hampstead and St John's Wood. It was designed as upmarket residential housing and became the main thoroughfare for the streets developed from the Maryon-Wilson estate. Despite the controversy over its construction it soon received praise for its design. A tree-lined boulevard, it consists of many redbrick villas and several buildings are now listed.

== Residents ==
A blue plaque commemorates the residence of the Hungarian artist Philip de László at Hyme House.

Other notable residents have included the artists Frank Holl and John Pettie. Its early reputation for painters led George Bernard Shaw to have a character in his 1893 play Mrs Warren's Profession explain that she learned her art from "some artistic people in Fitzjohns Avenue". Others to have lived on the street include the soprano Elsie Suddaby, the novelists Rafael Sabatini and Stella Gibbons, the civil engineer James Mansergh and the artist Edwin Long.

== Bibliography ==
- Bebbington, Gillian. London Street Names. Batsford, 1972.
- Cherry, Bridget & Pevsner, Nikolaus. London 4: North. Yale University Press, 2002.
- Dakers, Caroline. The Blue Plaque Guide to London. Macmillan, 1981.
- Wade, Christopher. The Streets of Belsize. Camden History Society, 1991.
