= Belsize Tunnel =

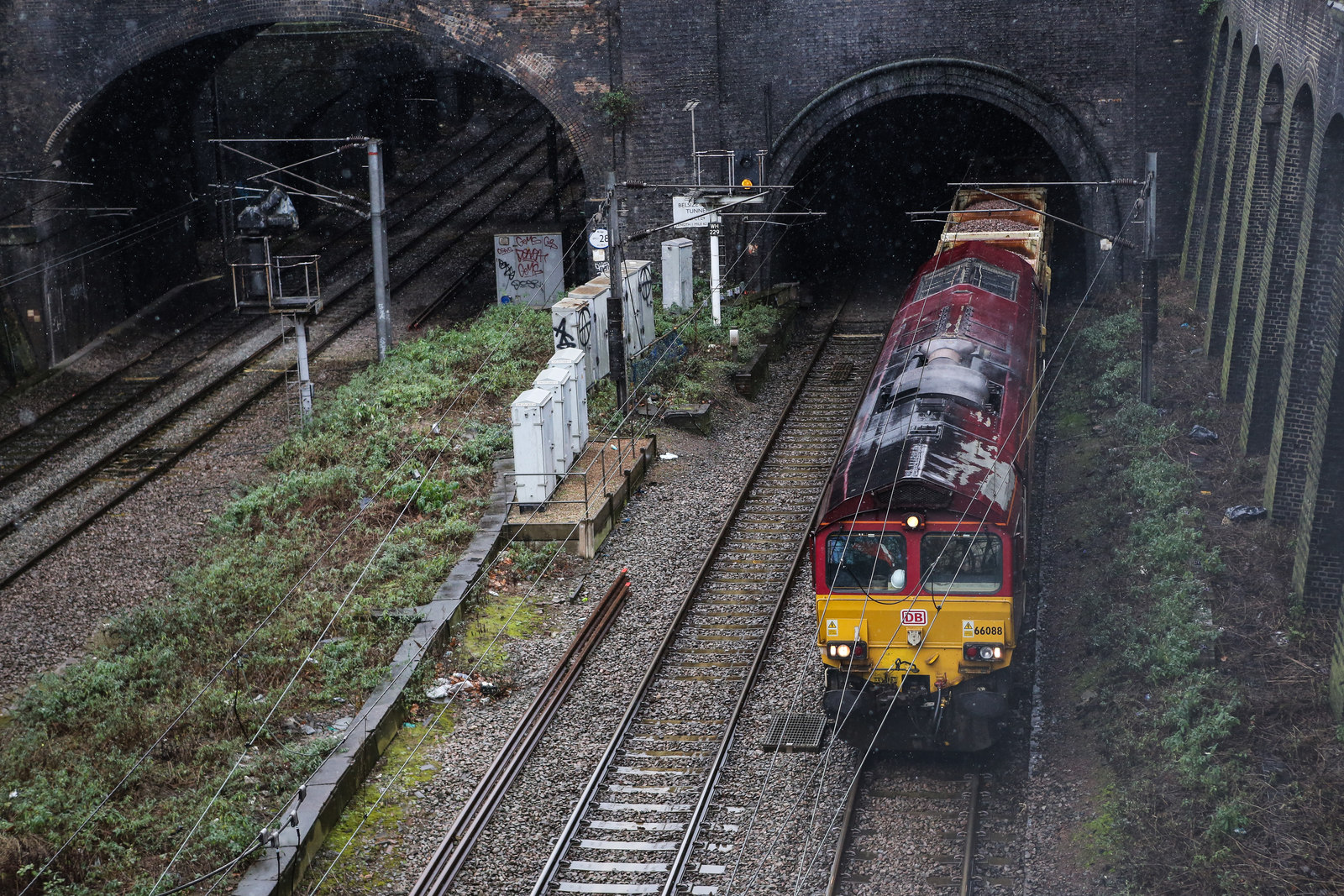
- The eastern portals of Belsize Tunnel. On the left, the original tunnel of 1865-67. On the right, the newer tunnel of 1883-84.
- Interactive map of Belsize Tunnel

Overview
- Line: Midland Main Line
- Location: Camden, London
- Coordinates: 51°33′08.70″N 0°09′26.3″W

Operation
- Work began: 1865
- Opened: 1867
- Owner: Network Rail

Technical
- Length: 1,867 yards (1,707 m)

Belsize tunnel is a railway tunnel at Belsize Park on the Midland Main Line between Kentish Town and West Hampstead Thameslink.

It was built between 1865 and 1867 for the Midland Railway extension from Bedford to London St Pancras. The ceremony of laying the first brick was performed on 27 January 1865 by Mr. Price, the chairman of the company, at Barham Road, Haverstock Hill. The contract price for the tunnel was £250,000 (equivalent to £27,160,000 in 2025).

The last brick was laid on 20 June 1867 by the chairman when the directors of the railway travelled along the line between Bedford and London.

The construction of the line out of St Pancras consisted of four tracks for the first 6 miles (9.7 km), with the exception of the Belsize Tunnel which only had two tracks. This was remedied in 1884 by the completion of another tunnel running parallel, to allow the full route of 6 miles to expand to four running lines. It was built under the Midland Railway (Additional Powers) Act, 1881. The additional tunnel was designed by W.H. Barlow, with James Campbell as reference engineer.

It comprises two tunnels 1 mile (1.6 km) long plus strainer arches and buttressed cuttings in the east arch.
