= Falkovich =

Falkovich or Falkovitsh (Yiddish: פאַלקאָװיטש) is a surname. Notable people with this surname include:

- Anatoliy Falkovich (1923–1994), Soviet actor
- Elye Falkovitsh (1898–1979), Belarusian linguist
- Joel Baer Falkovich (fl. 19th century), Russian dramatist
