= Robert Landarsky =

Belarusian artist

- Born: 1 April 1936 (age 90); Gomel/Vetka, Belarus
- Education: Belarusian State Academy of Arts Academy of Fine Arts St. Petersburg
- Occupation: Painter
- Movement: Impressionism

Robert Landarsky (born 1 April 1936) is a contemporary Belarusian artist. In 1979 he was awarded the Honored Artist of the Byelorussian SSR.

== Early life ==
Robert Landarsky was born in Gomel in 1936, a town in southern Belarus.

== Education ==
Robert Landarsky studied at Belarusian State Academy of Arts, from which he graduated in 1958. In 1966 he graduated from the Academy of Painting, Sculpture and Architecture of Ilya Repin in St. Peresburg. In 1979, Robert Landarsky was admitted to the Belarusian Union of Artists.

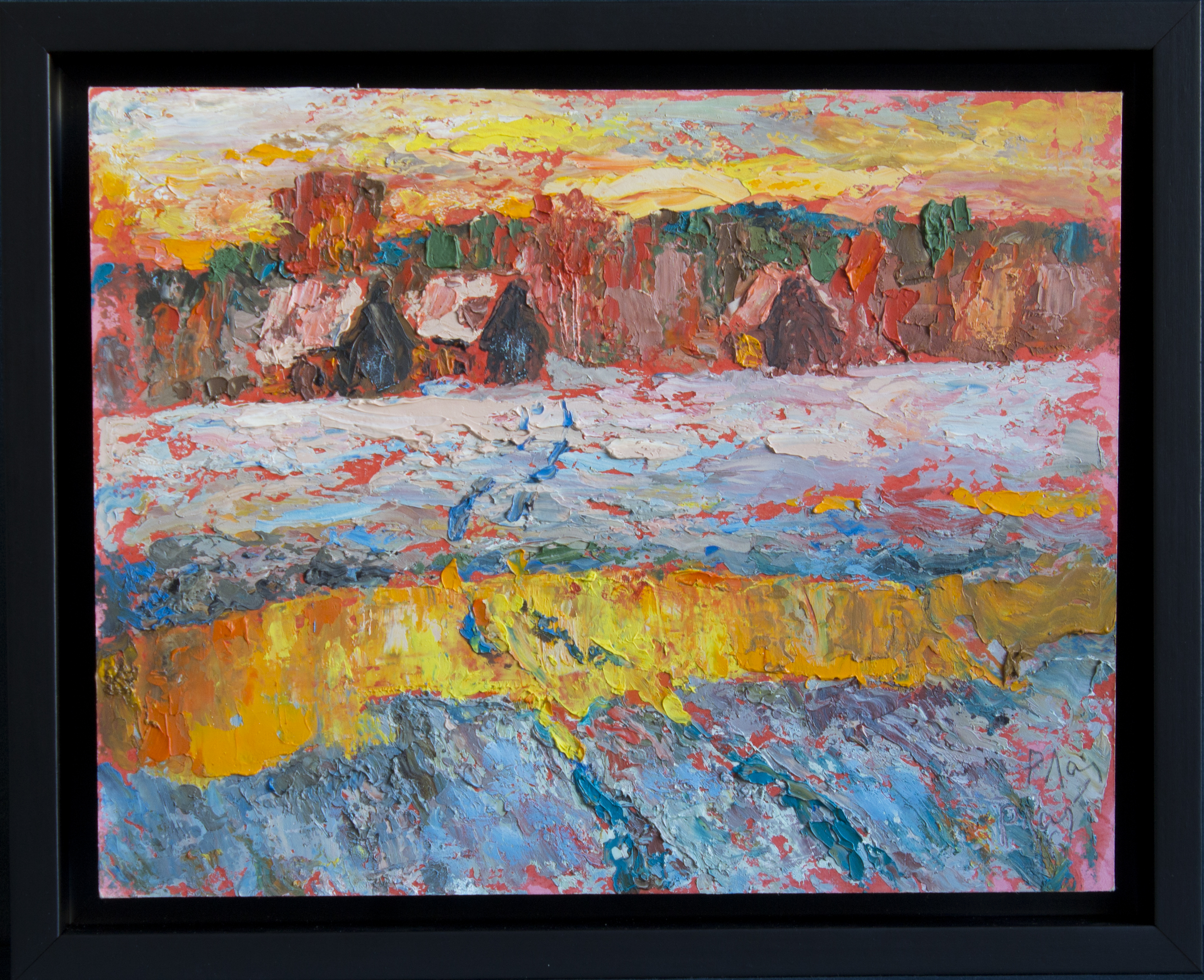
Robert Landarsky, 1991, Sunrise, oil on cardboard, 15 × 20 cm,

Robert Landarsky and Dmitry Oleynik (1929-2003), Nikolai Kazakevich (born 1934) created a new branch of Gomel art school called “Gomel impressionism”. Cheerful atmosphere, bright vivid colors and the absence of blackness. Robert Landarsky remembers the reaction at republican exhibitions: "... everyone used to visit our place at exhibitions to see our works. They differed from the rest art. Painter Dmitry Poliankov compared the works by the most of artists with “brown oven doors”. But our canvases were vivid." At the beginning there were a lot of criticism from the elder artists, but rather soon their manner got its audience as well as followers.

== Paintings ==
The paintings of Robert Landarsky is dominated by bright colors. It shows the influence of the Impressionists as Monet.

== Oeuvres ==
Oeuvres of Robert Landarsky
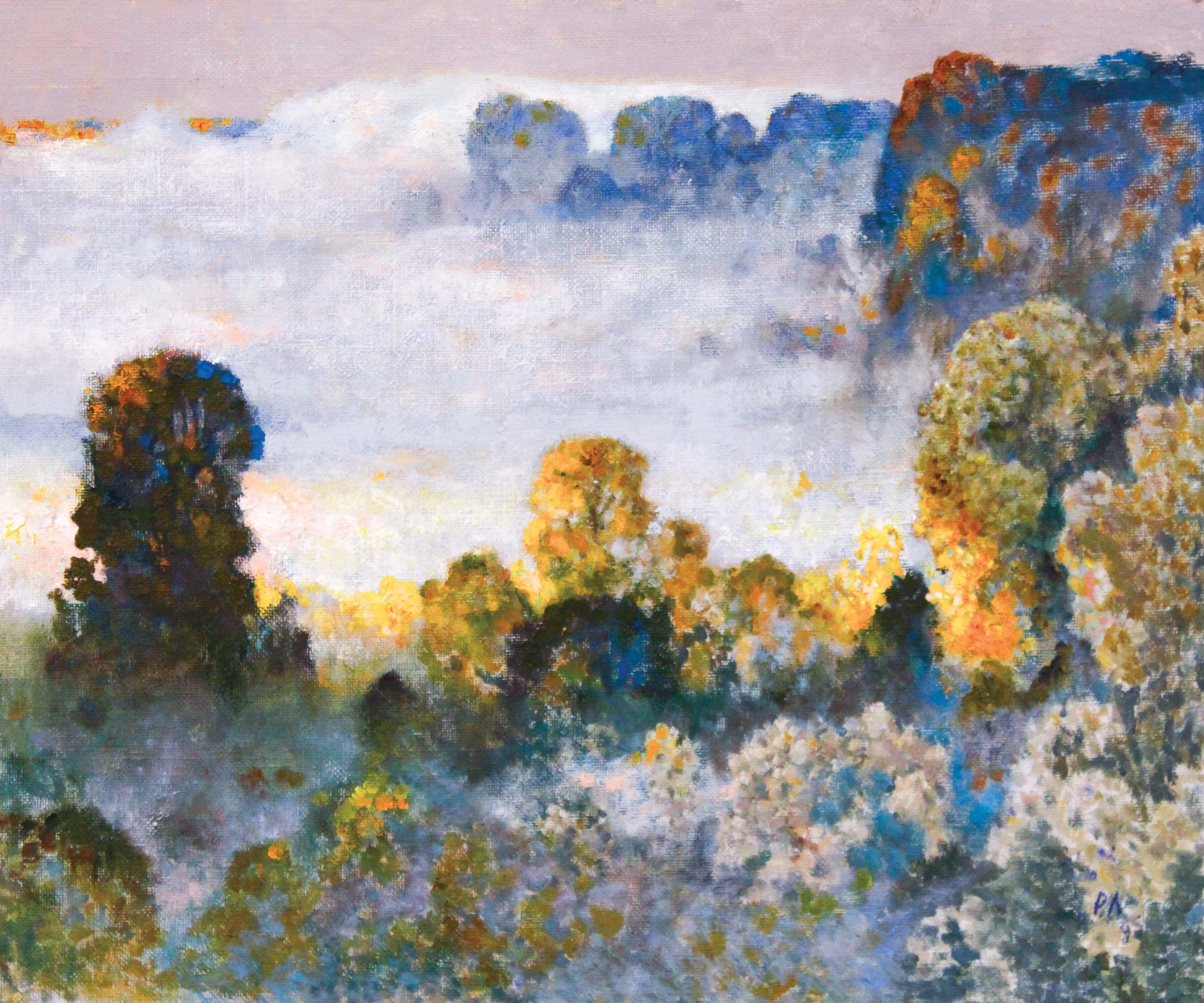
Robert Landarsky, oil on canvas 60 cm x 52 cm

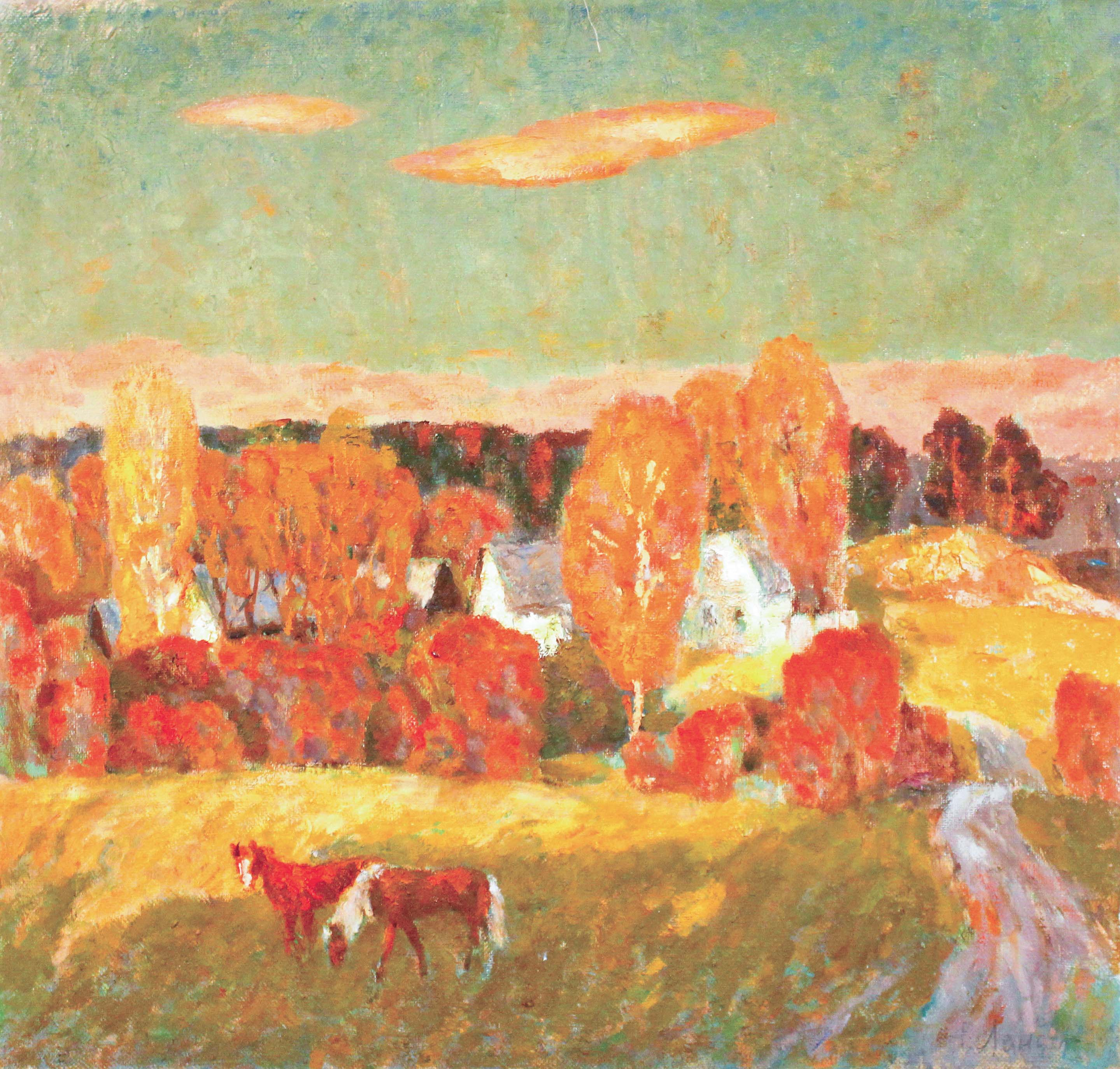
Robert Landarsky "Sunset"2006, 52 cm x 63 cm, oil on canvas

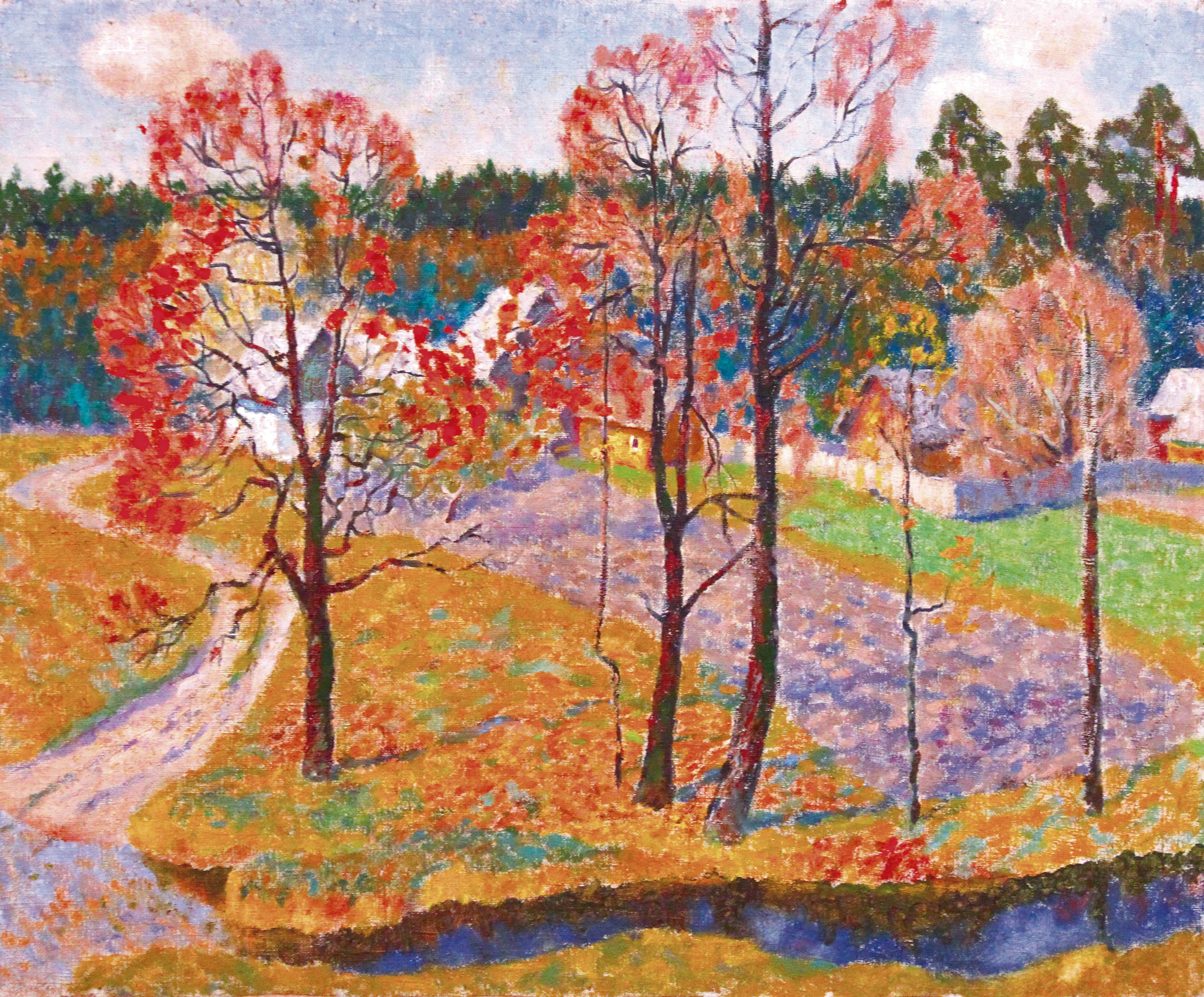
Robert Landarsky Autumn, 1991, 50 cm x 63 cm, oil on canvas
Robert Landarsky

== Honours ==
2003 Robert Landarsky was awarded the title of Honored Artist of the Byelorussian SSR.

== Collections ==
Robert Landarsky's works are held in the following public collections:

- Belarusian National Arts Museum, Minsk.
- The funds of the Belarusian Union of Artists.
- Tretyakov Gallery, Moscow.
- Museum of Modern Art, Frankfurt.
- Museum New Brunswick, USA.
- Museum of Modern Art, Mogilev.
- Museum of Modern Art, Vienne.

He has works in private collections in countries including France, Japan, US, Germany, Austria, Italy, Japan, Poland, and Estonia.

== Bibliography ==
1. 1.Catalogue of the watercolor exhibition (May - June) / [Preface of R. Landarsky]. - Gomel: Fulfill, 1973. - 13 p.
2. 2.Catalogue of the exhibition ["USSR is our Motherland"]: painting, sculpture, graphics, decorative and applied art / [author of the introductory article R. Landarsky]. - Gomel: [b. and.], 1972. - 21 p.
3. 3. Confession in colors / auth. Text O.V. Ananyev; Compiled by: O. V. Ananiev, I. V. Androsyuk, L. M. Zueva, S. L. Kurashova. - Gomel: Vecherny Gomel-Media Publishing House, 2013. - 256 p. - (Favorite Gomel). - [Landarsky R. S.128-133.]
4. 4.Landarsky Robert Yafimavich // Belarussin Encyclopedy At 18 t. T.9. - Minsk., 1999. - p. 118.
5. 5. The history of the Belarusian masters: 6 Volumes. Volume 6. —Mn., 1994.- [Landarsky R. p. 63-64, 219, 224-225.]
6. 6. Landarsky Robert // Pamyat: gist .- dakum. Chronika Gomel. At 2 kn. Kn.2.-I.- Mn., 1999.-P.429-430.
7. 7.Our Opening Day [R. Landarsky] // Metamorphosis. - 2013. - No. 1. - Tsv. on between p. 60-61.
8. 8. Chernobayeva, E. Maupassant and Robert Pattinson - who is who? : [including inform about the exhibition of Robert Landarsky "Nature has a state of mind" / Elena Chernobaeva // Soviet District. - 2012. - No.15 (Apr. 11). - p. 9.
9. 9. Ananiev, O. When painting is like a song: [about Robert Landarsky's exhibition “Love Song for Native Land” in the Palace of Rumyantsevs and Paskevichi / Oleg Ananiev // Gomel Gazette. - 2011. - No. 43 (Apr 16). - p. 8.
10. 10. Krepak, B. Zvonkі pallets sardachnay temy: [ab vystazhtsy landscape painter Robert Landarskagh, Gomel] / Barys Krapak // Culture. - 2011. - 9-15 kds. (No. 15). - C. 11
11. 11. Landarsky, R. Unspeakable, blue, tender: a conversation with the honored art worker of Belarus Robert Landarsky / Robert Landarsky; Irina Chernobay // Gomel Prada. - 2011. - No.72 (May 14). - p. 4.
12. 12. Robert Landarsky: "The artist should not be hungry" / Robert Landarsky // - 2011. - No. 17 (Apr. 27). - p. 8-9.
13. 13.Olina, L. Robert Landarsky, Nikolai Kazakevich: about good and not very good / L. Olin // Gomel Gazette. - 2009. - 45 (Apr. 18). - p. 8.
14. 14.Snyparkov, A. In the paintings of singing Belarus: [on the 70th anniversary of the Honored Art Worker, Chairman Gomel. region org. CX RB R.E. Landarsky] // Gomel Gazette. - 2006. - 1 Apr
15. 15.Snyparko, A. Zornoy Palitra Landarskaga / A. Shnyparko // Gomel Prada.— 2006. - 4 color.
16. 16. Gramatchikova, L. Zima is not soon: artist Robert Landarsky is 65 years old / L. Gramatchikova // Gomel Gazette. —2001.— 10 Apr.
17. 17. Klyga, A. Where the Polessian Madonna is Going: Artist R. Landarsky // Gomel Prada. - 2001. - 10 kras.
18. 18. Landarsky, R. Pra hour and the rule: interiors with a whale / R. Landarsky; N. Starchanka // Gomel Gazette. —2001.— 10 Apr.
