= Greg Yezersky =

American engineer

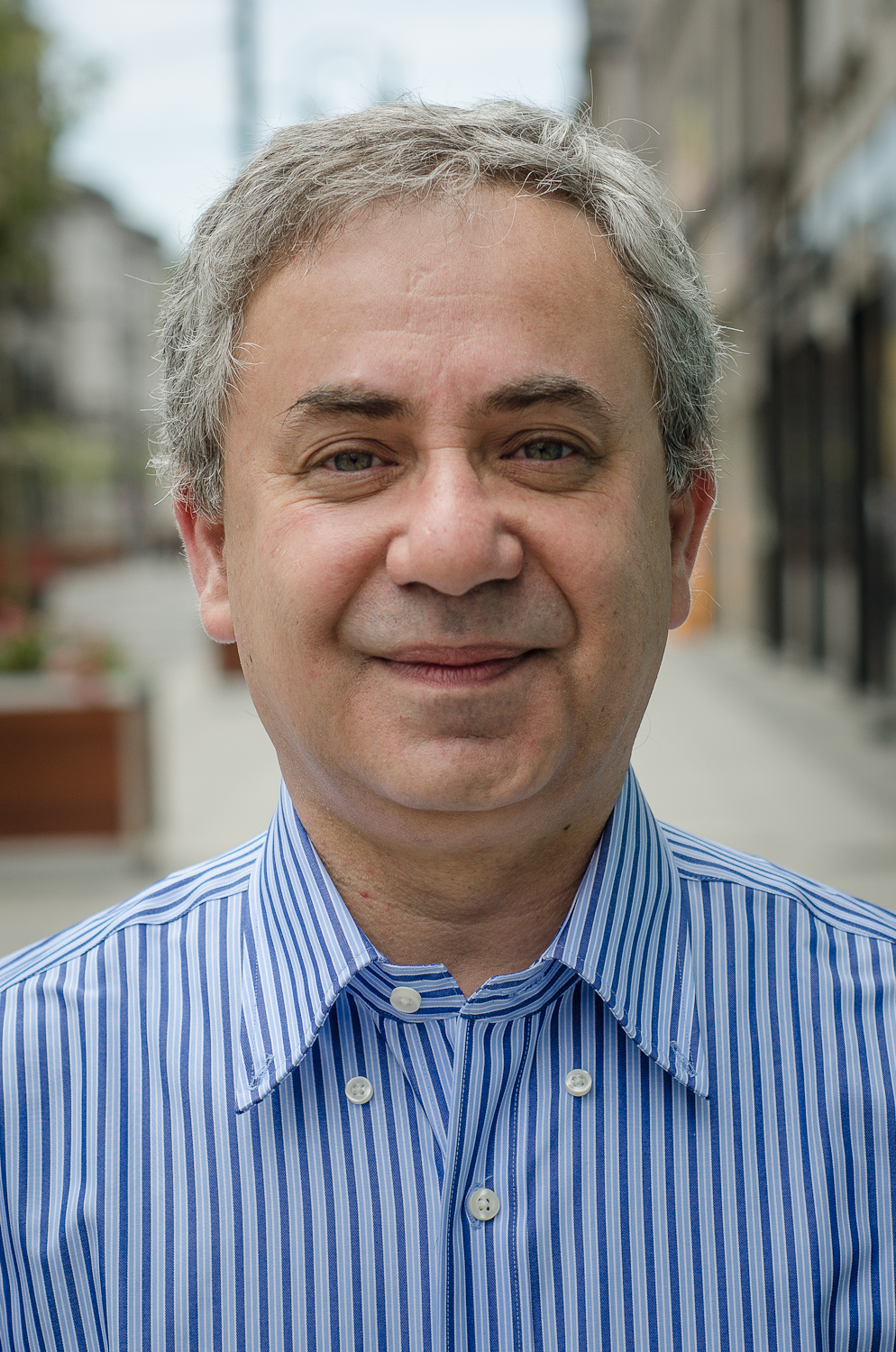
- Born: 8 August 1959 (age 66); Gomel, Belarus
- Occupations: Education, business
- Known for: Creator of General Theory of Innovation

Greg Yezersky is an American engineer, consultant and university lecturer, the creator of the General Theory of Innovation (GTI).

== Early life and career ==
Greg studied Mechanical Engineering and Fluid Power Systems in the Gomel Polytechnic Institute between 1976 and 1985. In 1983, he joined the Engineering Creativity Club in Gomel where he was introduced to the Theory of Inventive Problem Solving (TRIZ). After studying available TRIZ books, he wrote to Genrich Altshuller, the creator of TRIZ, who provided encouragement for an in-depth study of TRIZ. In 1985, he created TRIZ, a regional school in the city of Gomel, which he led until he left the Soviet Union for USA in 1989. In 1988, Greg was certified by Genrich Altshuller himself and they stayed in touch after Greg's departure to USA. Greg’s major TRIZ publication (co-written with Greg Frenklah) was released in 1990.

== Career in the United States ==
Greg arrived to Los Angeles, USA, on March 6, 1990. There, he started his consulting career while working on his theory of innovation. In 1991, he did a project for NASA on the on-board life support system. In 1992, he cofounded a TRIZ consulting company called Ideation International in the city of Santa Monica (California) where he managed projects that provided analytical TRIZ services to customers. Services included the analysis and solving complex technical problems, cost reduction, and technology forecasting. In 1995, he left Ideation to continue work on his own innovation theory and business methodologies which he used in his freelance consulting career. After one of his projects for DaimlerChrysler, he received an invitation to join the company where he created and led company’s Innovation Program at the R&D group. The program purpose was identification of future customers’ needs, development of conceptual solutions meeting these needs, and incorporation of these solutions into prototype/mock-up vehicles.

== Formulation of the General Theory of Innovation (GTI) ==
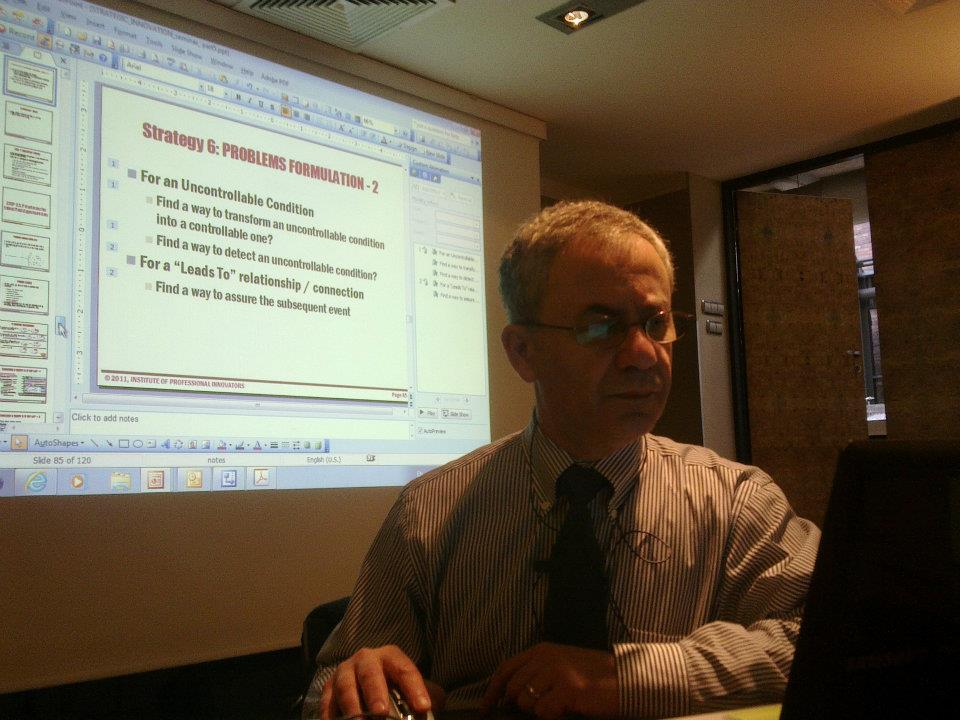
Greg during the seminar

The idea of a new theory that expanded the limitation of TRIZ scope was conceived in 1987 while its foundation was laid out in 1988. Genrich Altshuller, with whom Greg shared his idea, provided his encouragement and numerous suggestions. The work on further creation of what later became GTI continued in the US. In 2004, Greg presented some of the results at the University of Michigan-Dearborn conference on the future of engineering education after which he was invited to become an Adjunct Lecturer and teach the subject of innovation as a part of various engineering courses, which he continues to do. In 2005, the theory, its set of methodologies and corresponding tools received the name of General Theory of Innovation (GTI), which was suggested by Dr. Noel Leon Rovira, a professor at the Instituto Tecnológico y de Estudios Superiores de Monterrey (ITESM), Mexico. GTI is currently the only scientific theory in the field of innovation. At the same time, Greg founded Institute of Professional Innovators (IPI) with the purpose of disseminating GTI and enabling democratization of innovation. After leaving DaimlerChrysler in 2007, he is involved full-time in teaching GTI seminars globally for public at large and corporate clients. After visiting Poland in 2012, he started together with his partners a work on the book on the General Theory of Innovation, which the first edition was released in July 2015 in Poland. The English edition is expected in 2016.

== Other sources ==
- Greg Yezersky: Overview of the General Theory Of Innovation in TRIZ Journal, 7 April 2008
- Greg Yezersky: An overview of the General Theory Of Innovation in the "Trends in Computer Aided Innovation 2nd IFIP Working Conference on Computer Aided Innovation" ISBN 978-0-387-75455-0
- Greg Yezersky, Jim Hall: Why Pursuing the Triple Bottom Line is Not Enough, 8 February 2008 in greenbiz.com
