= Tsentrolit =

Foundry in the Republic of Belarus

Coordinates: 52°25′26″N 30°54′58″E

- Trade name: OAO GLZ Tsentrolit
- Native name: Гомельскі ліцейны завод «Цэнтраліт»
- Type: Public joint-stock company
- Industry: Foundry, Mechanical engineering
- Founded: 1963 (construction began); 24 October 1968 (first melting)
- Headquarters: Gomel, Belarus
- Products: Iron casting
- Parent: Belstankoinstrumentholding (since 2012)

Tsentrolit (Belarusian: Гомельскі ліцейны завод «Цэнтраліт») is one of the largest foundries in the Republic of Belarus.

It was decided by the Order of the Central Committee of the Communist Party of Belarus and the Council of Ministers of BSSR to build a specialized plant under the project, developed by the Kiev institute "Hyprokhimmash", for production of iron casting for machine tools and mechanical engineering. The construction started in 1963, and in 1965 the first products were manufactured in the premises of the commissioned mechanical repair shop – non-standard equipment for the further development of the own production. The first melting was carried out on 24 October 1968. At that time, Tsentrolit belonged to the system of Minstankoprom (Ministry of machine tools industry) of the USSR, which included nine more Tsentrolit plants in various corners of the Soviet Union.

At present, many of the Tsentrolit plants either have ceased to exist or have been operating as foundry shops or small works due to difficult financial situation. Gomel Tsentrolit has managed to save its production infrastructure.

== Current situation ==
Since 23 December 2010, Gomel Tsentrolit is officially registered as the Public joint stock company Gomel Foundry Plant Tsentrolit (OAO GLZ Tsentrolit). In 2012, OAO GLZ Tsentrolit joined Belstankoinstrumentholding together with 15 other large Belarusian industrial enterprises.
