= Gomel =

City in Gomel Region, Belarus

Gomel Гомель Homyel
- City
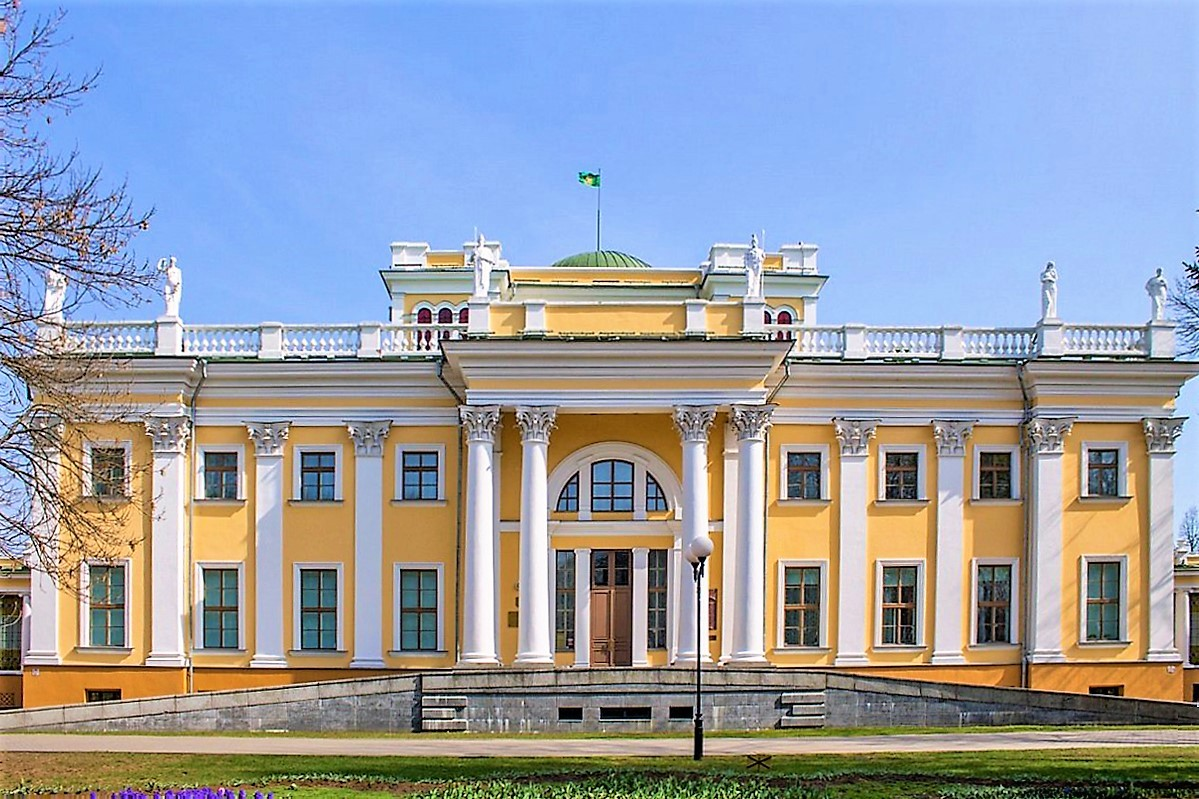
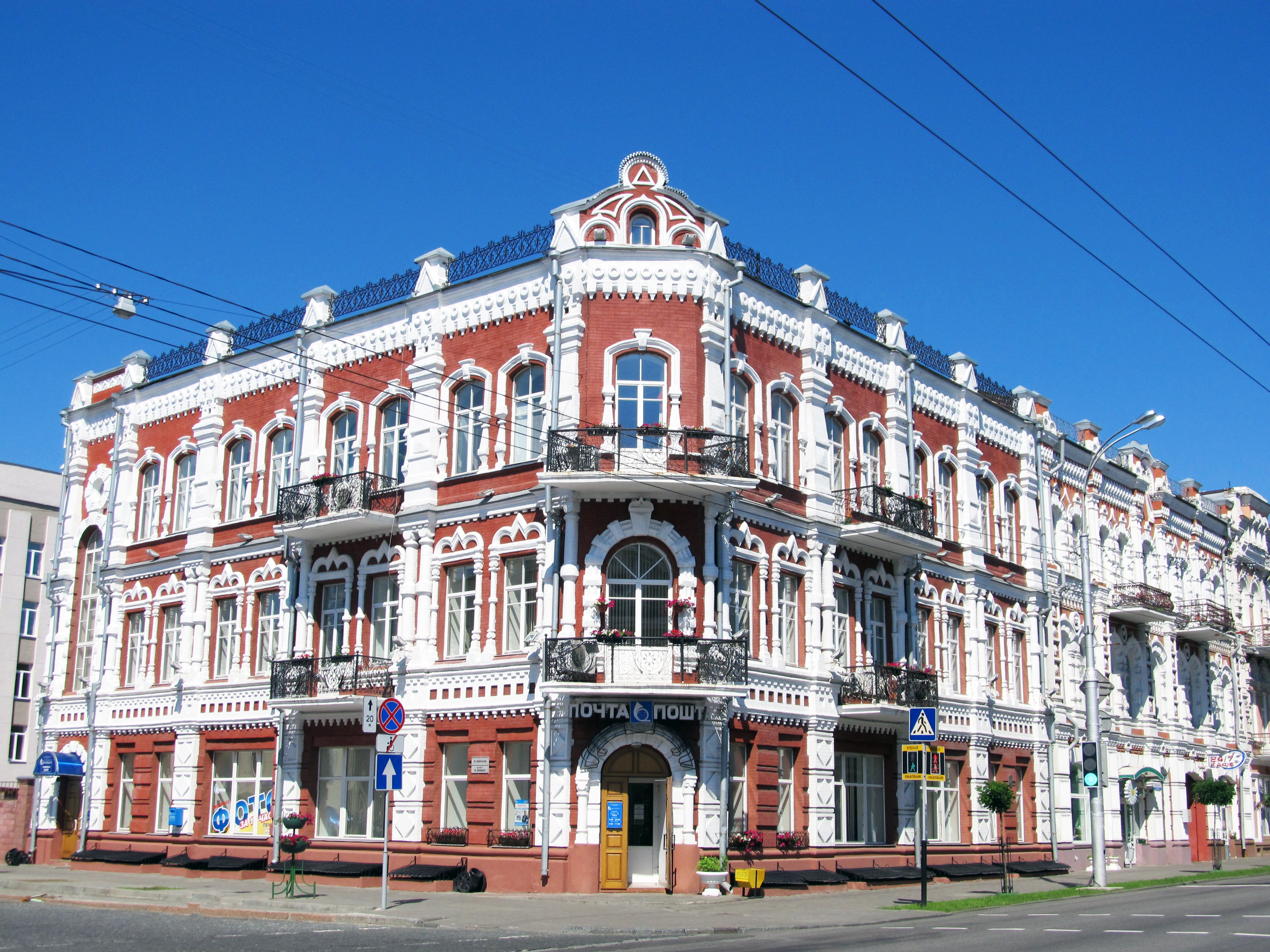
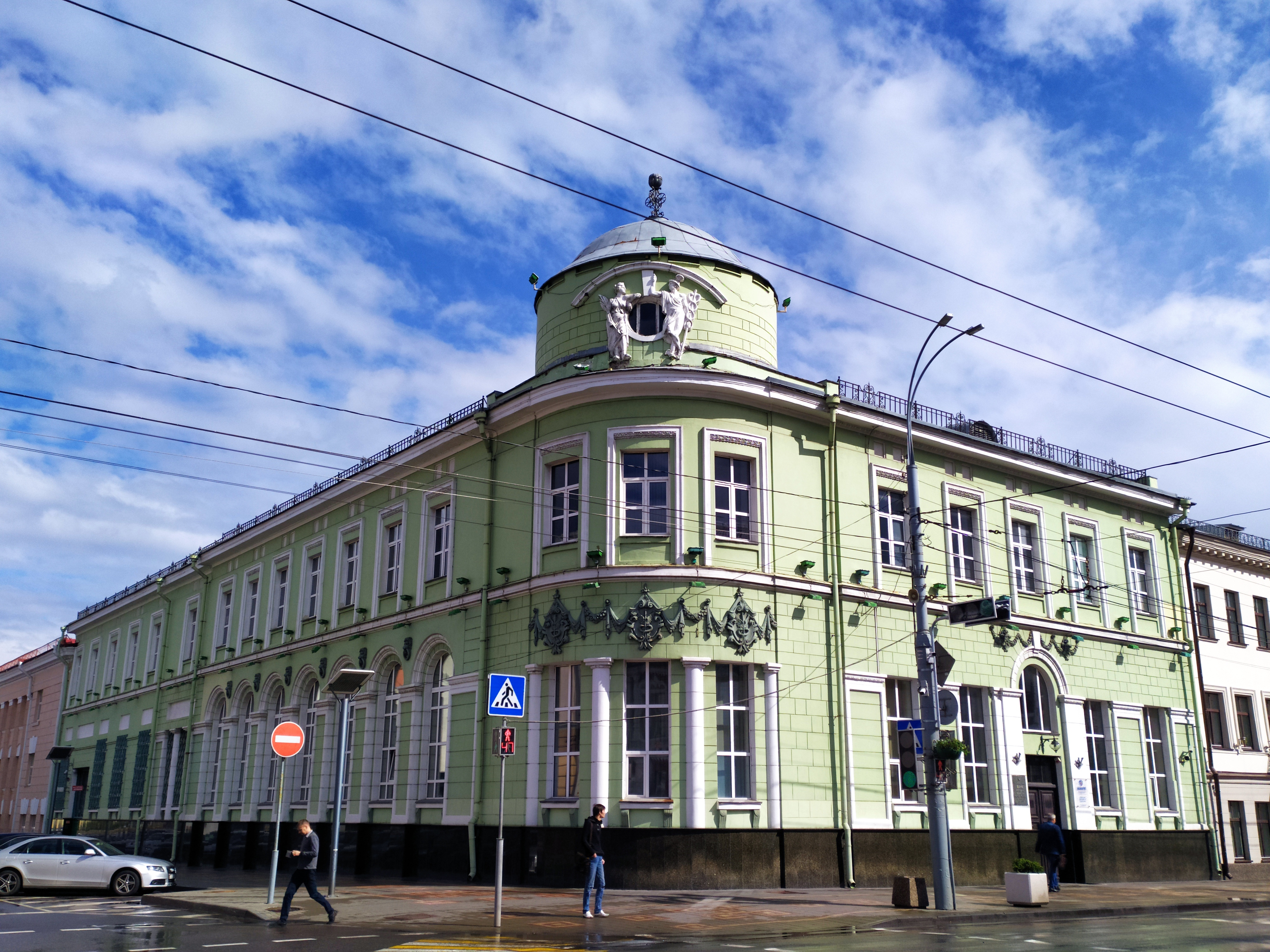
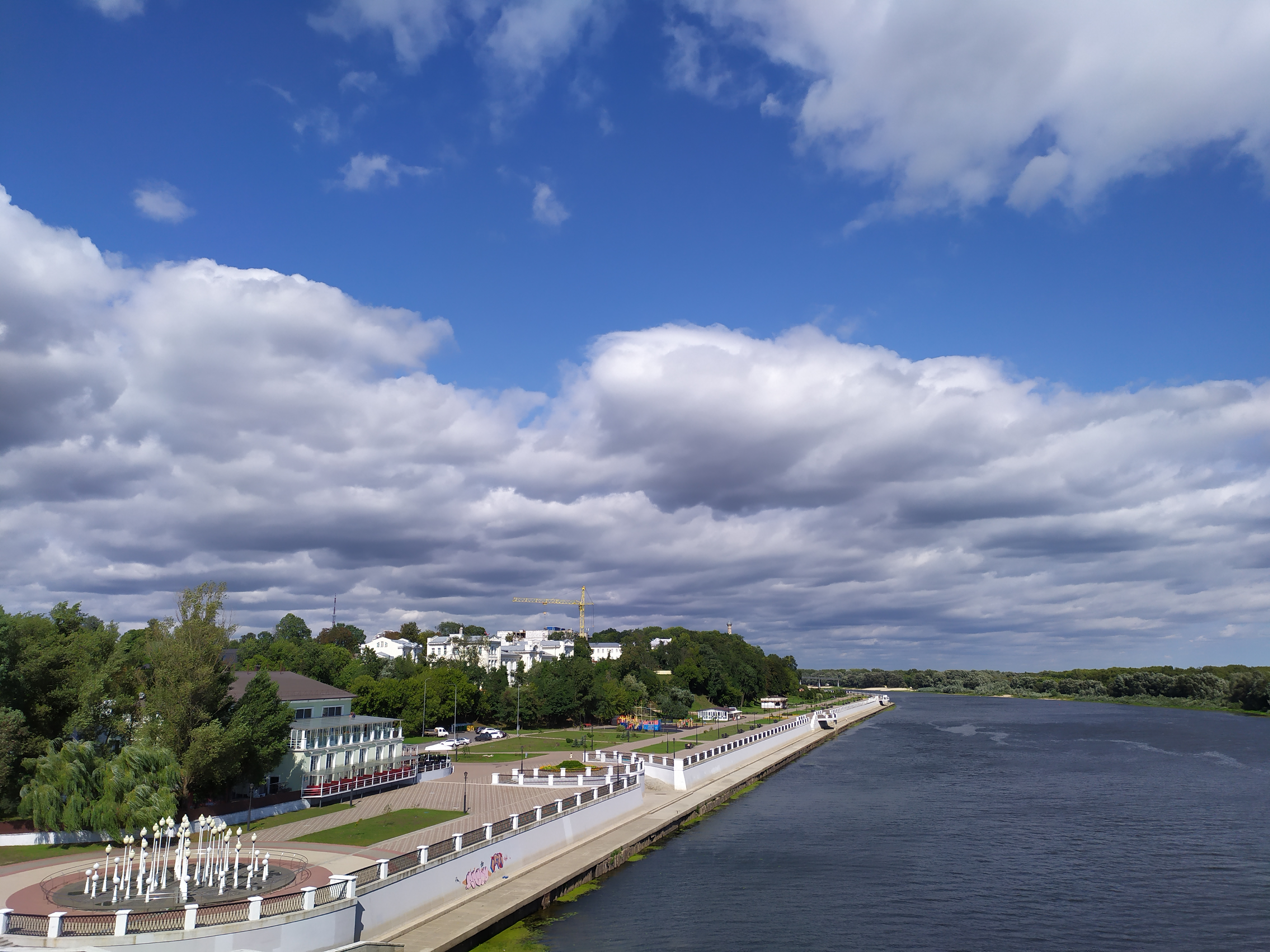
- Gomel Palace Post office National Bank Sozh River Embankment St. Peter and Paul Cathedral

- Flag Coat of arms
- Interactive map of Gomel
- Location within Belarus Location within Europe
- Coordinates: 52°26′43″N 30°59′03″E
- Country: Belarus
- Region: Gomel Region
- First mentioned: 1142

Government
  - Chairman: Petr Kirichenko

Area
  - City: 145.12 km^{2} (56.03 sq mi)
- Elevation: 138 m (453 ft)

Population (2025)
  - City: 501,193
  - Density: 3,453.6/km^{2} (8,944.9/sq mi)
  - Urban: 700,000
  - Urban density: 3,510/km^{2} (9,100/sq mi)
- Time zone: UTC+3 (MSK)
- Postal code: 246xx, 247xxx
- Area code: +375 232(2)
- License plate: 3
- Website: www.gorod.gomel.by

Gomel (Russian: Гомель, IPA: [ˈɡomʲɪlʲ]) or Homyel (Belarusian: Гомель, romanized: Homieĺ, (Note: Official transliteration (2023).) IPA: [ˈɣomʲelʲ]) is a city in south-eastern Belarus. It serves as the administrative centre of Gomel Region and Gomel District, though it is administratively separated from the district. As of 2025, it is the second-largest city in Belarus, with 501,193 inhabitants.

== Etymology ==
There are at least six narratives of the origin of the city's name. The most plausible is that the name is derived from the name of the stream Homeyuk, which flowed into the river Sozh near the foot of the hill where the first settlement was founded. Names of other Belarusian cities are formed along these lines: for example, Polotsk from the river Palata, and Vitebsk from the river Vitsba.

The first appearance of the name, as "Gomy", dates from 1142. Up to the 16th century, the city was mentioned as Hom', Homye, Homiy, Homey, or Homyi. These forms are tentatively explained as derivatives of unattested *gomŭ of uncertain meaning. The modern name for the city has been in use only since the 16th or 17th century.

== History ==
=== Kievan Rus' ===
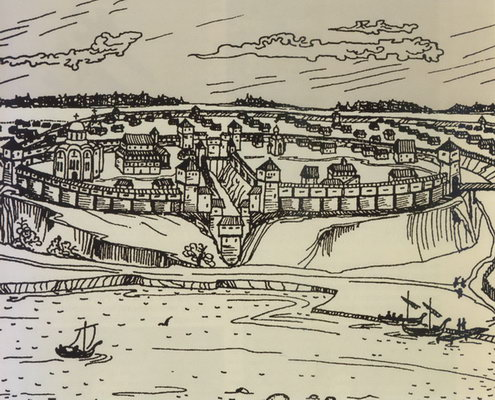
Gomel's inner fortress in the 12th century

Gomel was founded at the end of the 1st millennium AD on the lands of the Eastern Slavic tribal union of Radimichs. It lay on the banks of the Sozh River and the Homeyuk stream. Sozh's high right bank, with bluffs carving through, provided a natural fortification. For some time, Gomel was the capital of the Gomel Principality, before it became part of the Principality of Chernigov. Gomel is first mentioned in the Hypatian Codex under the year 1142 as a territory of the princes of Chernigov. For some time, Gomel was ruled by the prince of Smolensk Rostislav Mstislavich before it was re-captured by Iziaslav III Davidovich, after whose death it belonged to Sviatoslav Olgovich and then to Sviatoslav's son Oleg. Under Oleg, Gomel went to the Principality of Novgorod-Seversk. The next ruler was Igor Svyatoslavich—the protagonist of The Tale of Igor's Campaign. During this period, the town was a fortified point and the centre of a volost. In the 12th–13th centuries, the city's area was no less than 40 ha, and it had developed various crafts and was connected by trading routes with the cities of northern and southern Rus'. Archeological data have shown that the city was badly damaged during the Mongol-Tatar invasion in the first half of the 13th century.

=== Grand Duchy of Lithuania and Polish–Lithuanian Commonwealth ===
In 1335, the Gomel region was annexed to the Great Duchy of Lithuania by Algirdas. From 1335 to 1406, it was under the ownership of Prince Patricia Narymuntovich and his sons, from 1406 to 1419 the city was ruled by the grand duke's deputies, from 1419 to 1435 it belonged to Prince Svitrigaila, from 1446 to 1452 to Prince Vasiliy Yaroslavich, from 1452 to 1483 to the Mozhaysk prince Ivan Andreyevich, and from 1483 to 1505 to his son Semyon, who transferred it to the Grand Principality of Moscow.

During the Second Muscovite–Lithuanian War of 1500–1503, Lithuania tried to regain Gomel and other lands transferred to Moscow, but had suffered defeat and lost one-third of its territory. In 1535, Lithuanian and Polish forces under Jerzy Radvila, Jan Tarnowski and Andrzej Niemirowicz re-captured the city after the surrender of Moscow's deputy, D. Shchepin-Obolensky. In the same year, the Great Duke of Lithuania Sigismund Kęstutaitis founded Gomel Starostwo. According to the peace agreement of 1537, Gomel together with its volost remained a Lithuanian possession. In 1535–1565, Gomel was the centre of the starostwo, and from 1565 onwards it was in Rechytsa Powiat of Minsk Voivodeship.

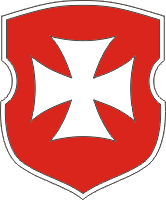
Coat of Arms of Gomel, 1560

In 1560, the city's first coat of arms was introduced. In 1569, Gomel became part of the Polish–Lithuanian Commonwealth. From this moment on, the city became the arena of numerous attacks and battles between the Cossacks, Russia, and the Polish-Lithuania Commonwealth. In 1572, Gomel Starostwo was given to B. Sapega. At the beginning of the 1570s, Gomel was captured by the forces of Ivan the Terrible, but in 1576 it was re-captured by J. Radvila. In 1581, Gomel was again attacked by Russian troops, and in 1595–1596 it was in the hands of Severyn Nalyvaiko's Cossacks.

After the beginning of the struggle against Orthodox Christianity in Lithuania, Orthodox Nikolayevskiy Cathedral was closed, following the order of Greek Catholic Eparch Josaphat Kuntsevych in 1621. In 1633, the city was besieged by Cossacks Bulgakov and Yermolin, in 1648 captured by Golovatskiy's Cossack detachment, and in 1649 by Martyn Nebaba's detachment. After that, Gomel got through several sieges in 1651, but in 1654 was captured by Ivan Zolotarenko's detachment. He and his sons held the city until 1667 and then began to serve under Alexis of Russia, however, after the Truce of Andrusovo Gomel at last returned to the Polish–Lithuanian Commonwealth, where it first belonged to M. K. Radvila and then—till the annexation by the Russian Empire—to the Czartoryski family. During the Great Northern War, Russian forces under Aleksandr Danilovich Menshikov stood in Gomel. In 1670, Gomel received Magdeburg rights. Towards the middle of the 17th century, the city fell into crisis mainly due to the struggles mentioned above. It suffered significant damage, the population decreased severely, and many crafts disappeared.

=== Russian Empire ===
Gomel became part of the Russian Empire after the first partition of the Polish–Lithuanian Commonwealth in 1772 and was confiscated by the imperial treasury. In 1775, Empress Catherine II gave Gomel and Gomel eldership in the eternal hereditary possession of Russian military commander Pyotr Rumyantsev.

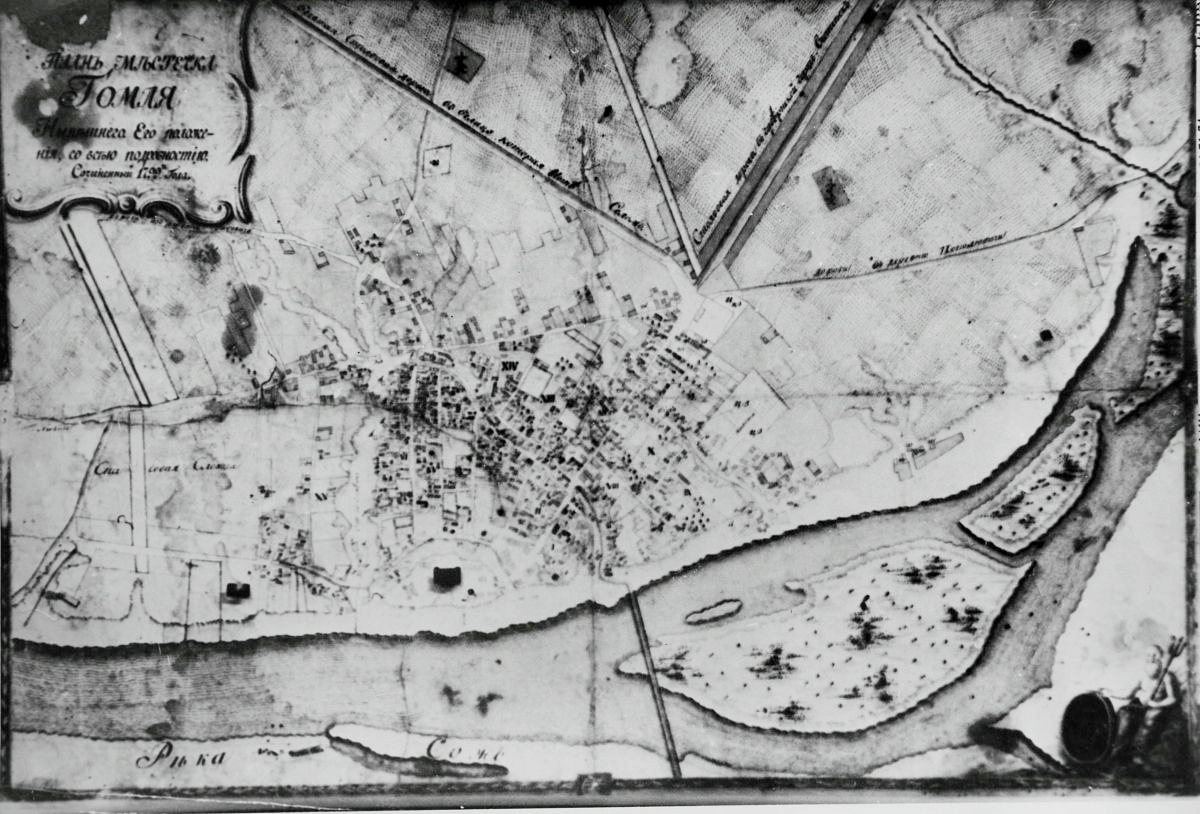
Map of Gomel in 1799

The period when Gomel was part of the Russian Empire was marked by rapid growth of the population, urban infrastructure, and industrial capacity, predominantly after the construction of railways in the late 19th century.

Saints Peter and Paul Cathedral, designed by architect John Clark, was built in 1809–1819. Nikolay Rumyantsev opened the first gymnasium, inn, glass, tile, weaving and spinning factories, and distilleries. Under his patronage a church, a synagogue, a pharmacy, a poorhouse, and a permanent wooden bridge across the Sozh river were built.

After the death of Nikolay Rumyantsev, the city came into the possession of his brother Sergei Petrovich Rumyantsev. However, due to lack of money, Sergei indebted Gomel with the state treasury of the Russian Empire. Subsequently, after not being able to pay off the debt, the treasury sold the city. The Gomel Palace was acquired by Prince Ivan Paskevich, and the rest of the city by Nicholas I (1838). Paskevich had an English garden made around the palace, which is still in place today. In 1856, the estate passed on to his son Fyodor Ivanovich Paskevich.

In 1842, the Prince Józef Poniatowski Monument, one of the most iconic monuments of Warsaw, was relocated from Warsaw to Gomel, before it was restored to Poland in 1922.

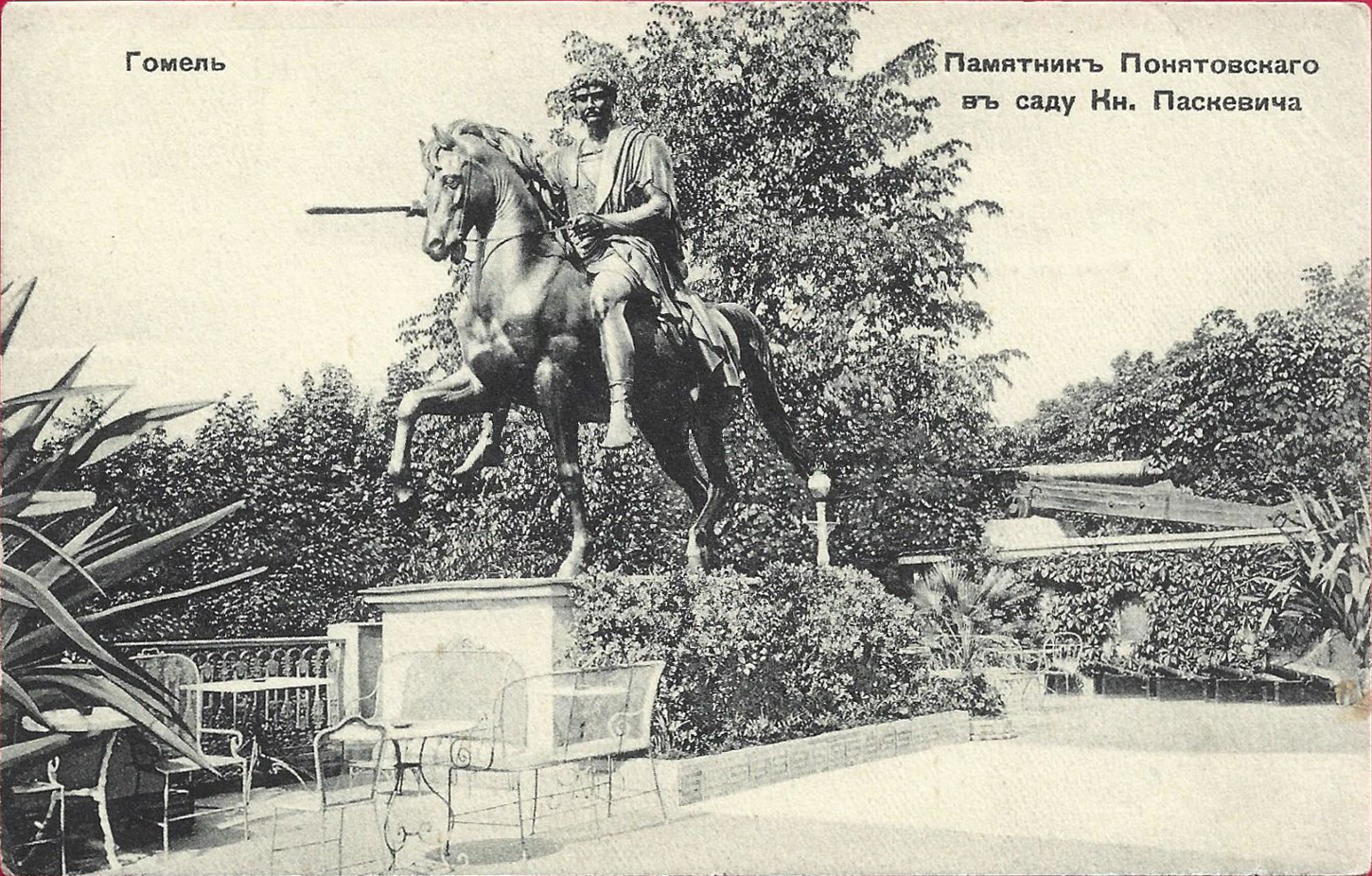
Prince Józef Poniatowski Monument in Gomel

In 1852, Gomel became the county town of the former Belitsa County (renamed to Gomel County). This was preceded by the construction of the St. Petersburg–Kiev highway and St. Petersburg–Sebastopol telegraph line, both of which passed through Gomel, and the opening of a beet sugar factory.

The construction of railways in the territory of Belarus in the late 19th century (Libau–Romny Railway in 1873 and the Polesia railway in 1888) made Gomel a major railway junction and "drew many businessmen to the town, causing the establishment of banks, firms and factories, which in turn changed the pastoral and provincial character of a bygone Gomel into a trading and mercantile one"

By 1913, Gomel had become a major industrial city with 104,500 inhabitants. Nearly 44% of its industrial output was metalworking, with large workshops servicing the rolling stock of the Libau–Romny Railway and the Polesia railway. Other significant industries were woodworking, match manufacturing, breweries, and churning.

=== Civil war and early Soviet era ===
Preceding the treaty of Brest-Litovsk, on 1 March 1918, the city was occupied (the Executive Committee of the Gomel Council of Workers' Deputies had left already on 21 February) by German forces. In March 1918, the city became part of Chernihiv Governorate of the Ukrainian State. After the overthrow of the Ukrainian State Gomel was administered by the Ukrainian People's Republic for 25 days.

On 14 January 1919, Gomel was occupied by the Red Army. In March 1919, the largest uprising against the Bolsheviks occurred in Gomel, known as the short-lived Strekopytov Revolt. Rebels seized strategic facilities and executed members of the Soviet leadership in the city. The uprising was crushed by Red Army units dispatched to Gomel.

In 1919, Gomel became the centre of Gomel Governorate in the Russian Soviet Federative Socialist Republic. After the end of hostilities, the restoration of industry and transportation began. In the 1920s, a number of large businesses were created: shipyards, a factory named "Polespechat", a shoe factory named "Trud", a bakery, and the first phase of a municipal power plant. In 1926, the city was passed to the Byelorussian SSR.

By 1940, 264 industrial enterprises had been established.

=== World War II ===
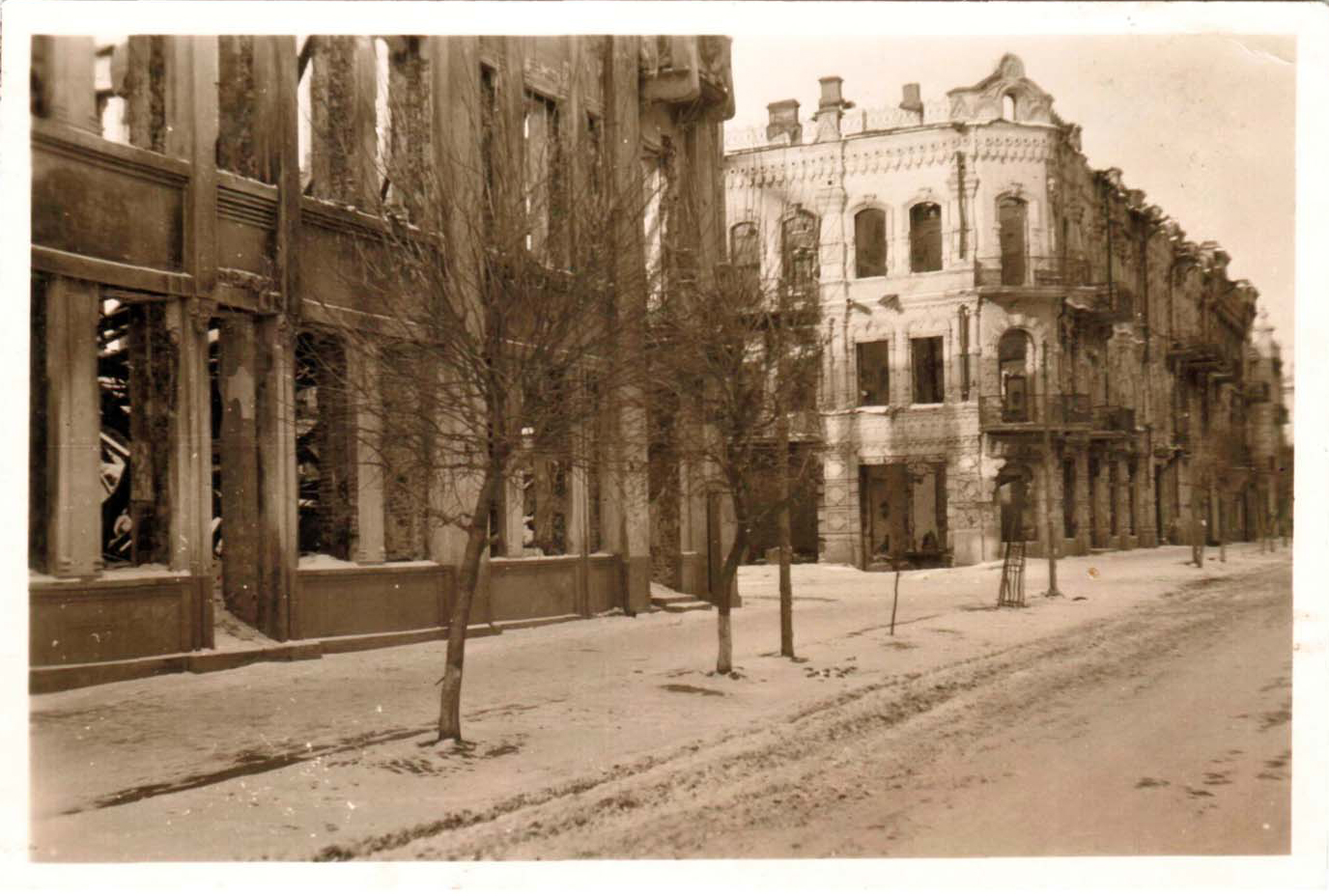
War-torn Homel in 1941

During World War II, Gomel was under German occupation from the 19th of August 1941 until the 26th of November 1943. The occupiers operated a prison, the Dulag 220 and Dulag 121 transit camps for prisoners of war, and forced labour camps for prisoners of war and civilians, part of whom were Jews.

The city was taken by Rokossovsky's Belorussian Front during the Gomel–Rechitsa Offensive. Eighty percent of the city had been destroyed, and the population of Gomel had dropped dramatically. According to the data of the registry, it numbered less than 15,000 inhabitants, compared to 144,000 in 1940.

=== Post-war period ===
After the war, the restoration of Gomel began promptly. The majority of pre-revolutionary buildings had been lost. City streets were considerably expanded, and buildings in a Stalinist style were erected. By 1950, almost all of the pre-war enterprises had resumed their work.

=== Chernobyl disaster ===
As a result of the disaster at the Chernobyl Nuclear Power Plant on 26 April 1986, Gomel suffered radioactive contamination. At the beginning of the 21st century, a research centre for radiation medicine and human ecology was built in Gomel to overcome and study the consequences of the catastrophe at Chernobyl.

The development of radiological dose values varies between individual villages in severely contaminated regions, depending on the surroundings and the economic orientation. In general, living is possible in these areas today, even in formerly closed-off zones, if appropriate dietary rules are observed.

=== Recent history ===
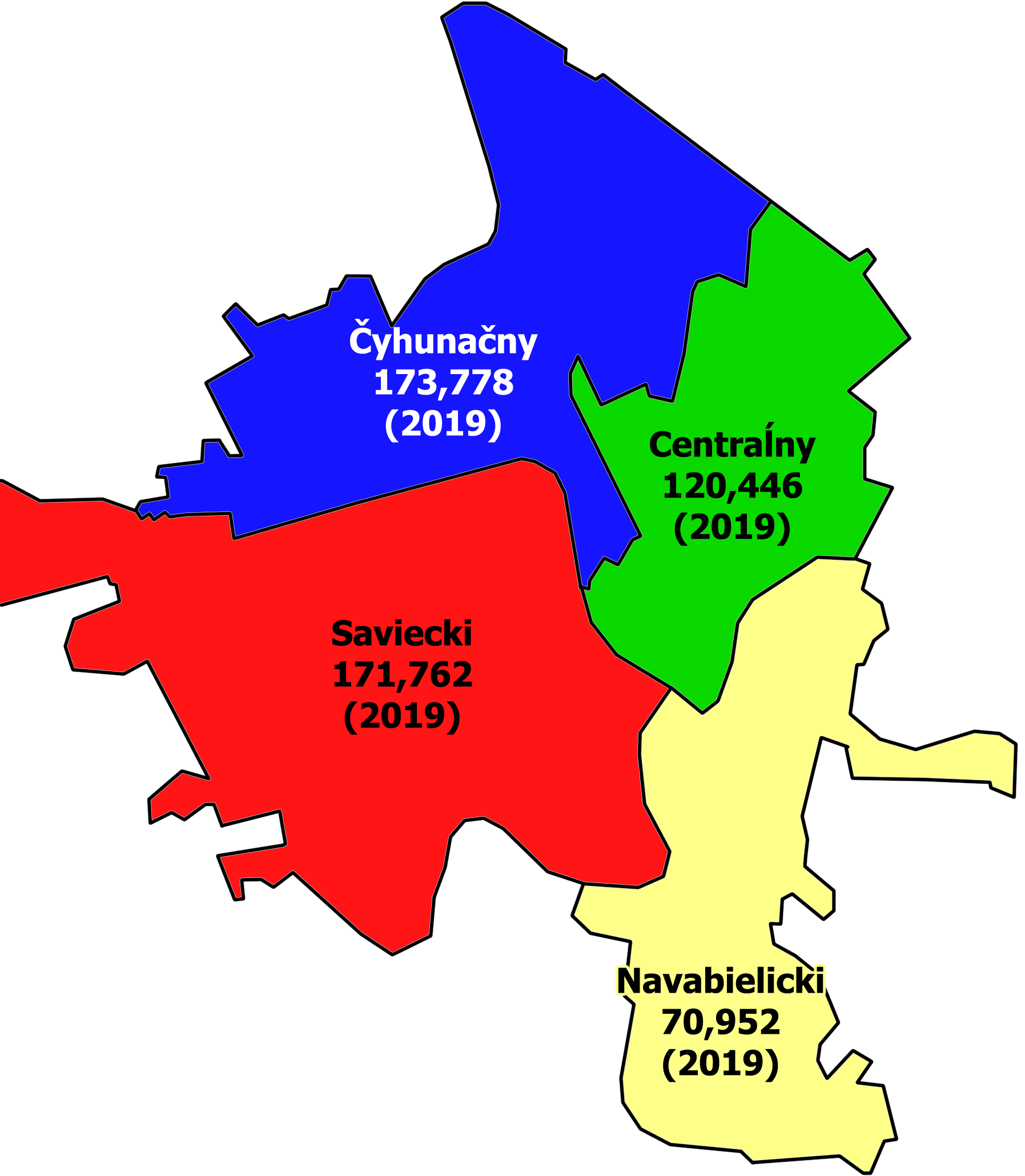
Districts and population of the city

On 27 July 1990, the Declaration of State Sovereignty of the Byelorussian Soviet Socialist Republic was drafted. Gomel became a city in the independent state of the Republic of Belarus the following year.

During the Russian invasion of Ukraine, Gomel became an important base for Russian forces.

== Population ==
In 2013, the city's population numbered 515,325, indicating a positive population growth and hence a reversal of the demographic crisis that began in 1993.

Historical population

Year	Pop.	±%
1775	5,000	—
1858	13,700	+174.0%
1880	23,600	+72.3%
1897	36,775	+55.8%
1913	104,500	+184.2%
1925	81,900	−21.6%
1931	109,900	+34.2%
1939	139,120	+26.6%
1943	15,000	−89.2%
1959	168,270	+1021.8%

Year	Pop.	±%
1970	272,253	+61.8%
1979	382,785	+40.6%
1989	500,846	+30.8%
1999	475,500	−5.1%
2009	482,652	+1.5%
2019	510,459	+5.8%
2023	501,802	−1.7%
2024	501,102	−0.1%
2025	501,193	+0.0%

=== Jewish community ===
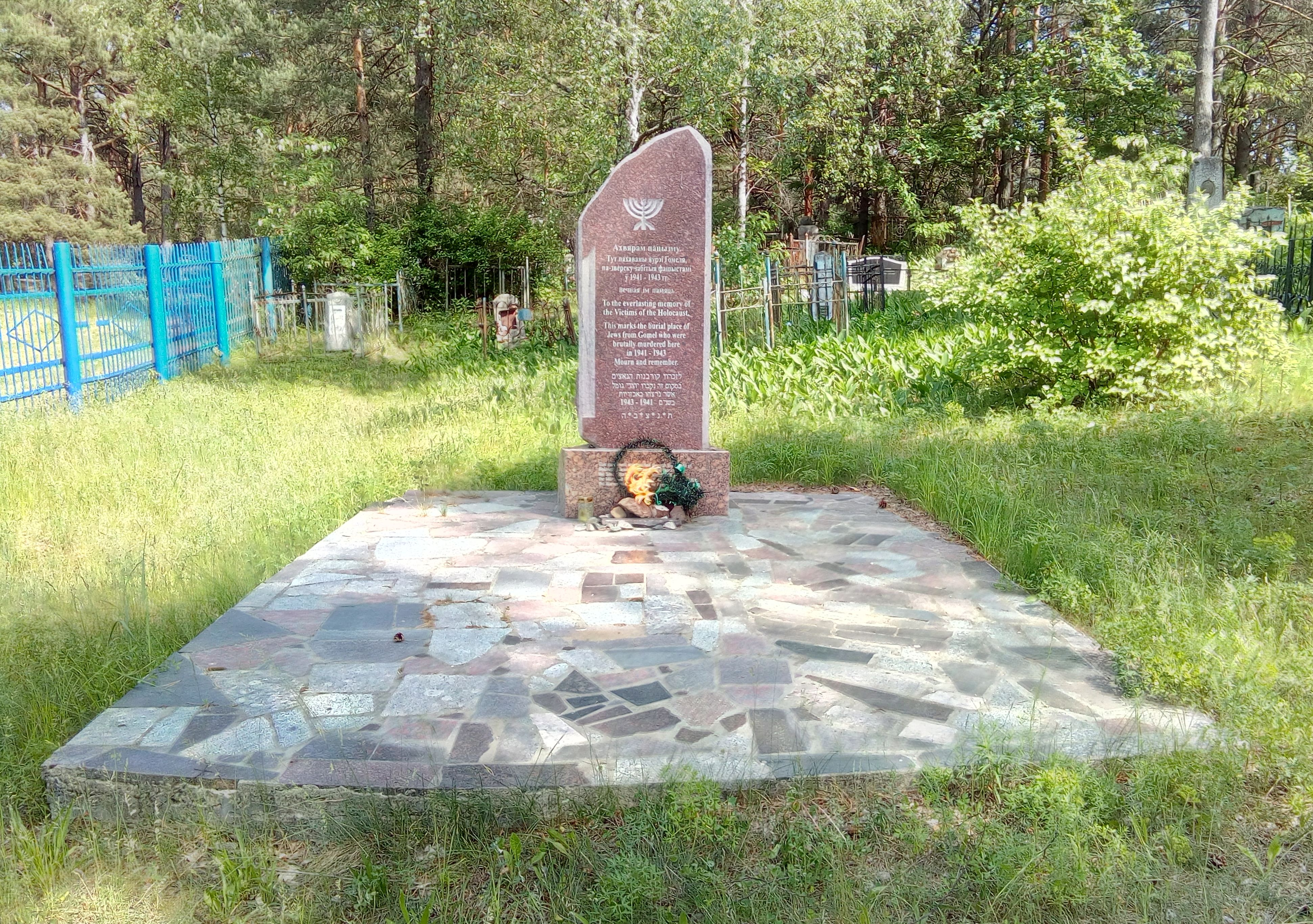
Mass grave of Holocaust victims

After the annexation of Gomel by the Russian Empire and the creation of the Pale of Settlement, Gomel gradually became a centre of resettlement for the Jewish population of Russia. According to the 1897 census, 55% of the population of Gomel were Jews. In 1903, there was a violent pogrom against the Jewish population of the city. From that moment on, a gradual decrease of the number of Jews in the city began. 40,880 Jews lived in Gomel in 1939, when they comprised 29.4% of the total population. Most Jews had left the city in anticipation of German occupation, but still between 3,000 and 4,000 Gomel Jews fell victim to the Holocaust. The end of the 1980s and beginning of the 1990s saw mass emigration of Jews from Gomel, but at the same time restoration of Jewish institutions in the city by the remaining Jewish inhabitants.

== Geography ==
Gomel is situated in the southeastern part of the country, on the right bank of the river Sozh, 302 km (188 mi) south-east of Minsk, 534 km (332 mi) east of Brest, 171 km (106 mi) south of Mogilev, 237 km (147 mi) west of Bryansk and 111 km (69 mi) north of Chernihiv.

The terrain on which the city as a whole is built, is flat. On the right bank of the river, is a gradually decreasing plain water-glacial and fluvial terrace of the Sozh river. The left bank is a low-lying alluvial plain. The highest elevation of 144 meters above sea level is found on the northern outskirts of Gomel, the lowest elevation of 115 m at the water boundary of the Sozh. Novobelitskiy district, which is located on the left bank of the river (i.e., towards the south), has elevations averaging 10–15 meters lower than the northern and central parts of the city. On the left bank of the Sozh many kilometers of beaches can be found.

Despite the city's relatively flat topography, it does have some significant oscillations. For example, the bluffs along the right bank of the Sozh stand out among such natural features with a slope of over 70% in places, and the gypsum stacks of the Gomel Chemical Plant among the manmade ones. The highest mound has a prominence of roughly 82 metres (270 ft).

=== Climate ===
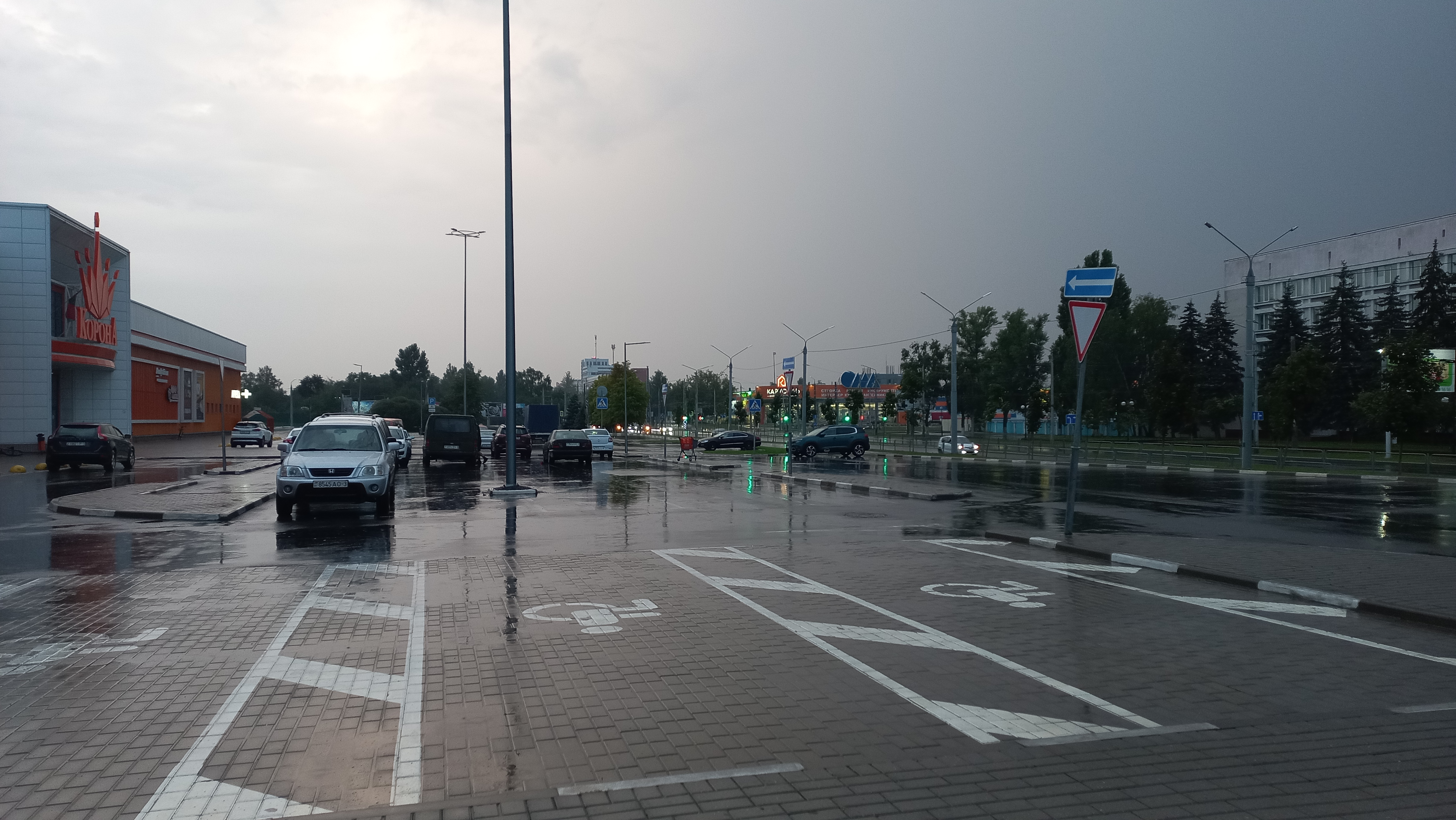
View of the city after a summer rainstorm

Gomel has a warm-summer humid continental climate (Köppen climate classification Dfb, Trewartha Dcbo). Summers see occasional heat spells in the low and mid 30s, and are comparatively long, lasting from mid-May to early September, with more than 113 days averaging above 15 °C (59 °F) and highs reaching 30 °C (86 °F) on roughly 13 days per year. On 7 August 2010, Gomel recorded a temperature of 38.9 °C (102.0 °F), which is the highest temperature to have ever been recorded in Belarus. Like the rest of the central band of the East European Plain, the city has its minimum of relative humidity in May, which results from the rapidly rising temperatures and increased air’s water holding capacity. Unlike the eastern portion thereof, however, it does not have a second minimum in July or August as the temperatures are not high enough to dry out the soil to the extent where evapotranspiration drops significantly, thus preventing the surface layers of the air from moisturizing. Precipitation is common year-round, but even more so in the summer. July in particular brings ample rainfall, often in the form of thunderstorms. Winters, on the other hand, beginning in December and ending in early March, are generally marked by persistently gray skies, subfreezing daily means, and rather moderate snow depths. Thaws are not by any means uncommon and only 48 days throughout the three winter months won’t see temperatures climb above freezing. Based on smoothed daily means, the period of air frost is about 116 days.

Coming with the prevailing westerlies, the frequent invasion of maritime air masses from the Atlantic moderates the climate, explaining the mild winters and relatively cool, somewhat cloudy summers compared to those farther inland. Overall, there is an average of 24 thunderstorms and 42 foggy days annually. Gomel’s bioclimatic type is upper supratemperate (Note: Sum of positive temperatures based on climate data table.) subhumid.

Climate data for Gomel (1991–2020, extremes 1927–present) (Note: Mean maxima and minima calculated from Weather & Climate and KNMI individual monthly extremes data.)
Month	Jan	Feb	Mar	Apr	May	Jun	Jul	Aug	Sep	Oct	Nov	Dec	Year
Record high °C (°F)	10.0 (50.0)	15.8 (60.4)	24.2 (75.6)	29.3 (84.7)	32.5 (90.5)	36.2 (97.2)	37.9 (100.2)	38.9 (102.0)	34.9 (94.8)	27.5 (81.5)	18.0 (64.4)	11.6 (52.9)	38.9 (102.0)
Mean maximum °C (°F)	4.7 (40.5)	6.2 (43.2)	13.8 (56.8)	23.2 (73.8)	28.1 (82.6)	30.9 (87.6)	32.2 (90.0)	32.4 (90.3)	27.0 (80.6)	21.4 (70.5)	12.1 (53.8)	6.4 (43.5)	33.7 (92.7)
Mean daily maximum °C (°F)	−1.8 (28.8)	−0.5 (31.1)	5.3 (41.5)	14.1 (57.4)	20.5 (68.9)	23.9 (75.0)	25.9 (78.6)	25.1 (77.2)	19.0 (66.2)	11.5 (52.7)	4.0 (39.2)	−0.5 (31.1)	12.2 (54.0)
Daily mean °C (°F)	−4.2 (24.4)	−3.5 (25.7)	1.3 (34.3)	9.0 (48.2)	15.0 (59.0)	18.6 (65.5)	20.4 (68.7)	19.3 (66.7)	13.7 (56.7)	7.4 (45.3)	1.6 (34.9)	−2.7 (27.1)	8.0 (46.4)
Mean daily minimum °C (°F)	−6.5 (20.3)	−6.2 (20.8)	−2.2 (28.0)	4.3 (39.7)	9.8 (49.6)	13.5 (56.3)	15.4 (59.7)	14.2 (57.6)	9.2 (48.6)	4.0 (39.2)	−0.4 (31.3)	−4.8 (23.4)	4.2 (39.6)
Mean minimum °C (°F)	−19.2 (−2.6)	−17.7 (0.1)	−10.5 (13.1)	−2.5 (27.5)	2.7 (36.9)	7.4 (45.3)	10.4 (50.7)	8.1 (46.6)	1.9 (35.4)	−4.2 (24.4)	−9.7 (14.5)	−15.2 (4.6)	−22.4 (−8.3)
Record low °C (°F)	−35.0 (−31.0)	−35.1 (−31.2)	−33.7 (−28.7)	−13.6 (7.5)	−2.5 (27.5)	−0.2 (31.6)	6.0 (42.8)	1.2 (34.2)	−3.2 (26.2)	−12.0 (10.4)	−21.7 (−7.1)	−30.8 (−23.4)	−35.1 (−31.2)
Average precipitation mm (inches)	36 (1.4)	35 (1.4)	36 (1.4)	35 (1.4)	64 (2.5)	73 (2.9)	100 (3.9)	56 (2.2)	52 (2.0)	58 (2.3)	45 (1.8)	42 (1.7)	632 (24.9)
Average extreme snow depth cm (inches)	16.1 (6.3)	15.8 (6.2)	11.7 (4.6)	1.7 (0.7)	1.1 (0.4)	0 (0)	0 (0)	0 (0)	.2 (0.1)	.7 (0.3)	5.9 (2.3)	11.7 (4.6)	23.1 (9.1)
Average rainy days	8	7	10	13	14	16	14	12	14	14	13	9	144
Average snowy days	18	17	10	2	0.1	0	0	0	0.03	2	10	16	75
Average relative humidity (%)	86	83	77	66	64	69	70	71	77	81	87	88	77
Mean monthly sunshine hours	43.3	72.5	143.9	201.3	272.6	293.7	297.9	269.9	194.4	119.9	47.0	32.1	1,988.5
Percentage possible sunshine	19	25	37	42	54	54	54	55	45	35	17	13	41
Source 1: Pogoda.ru.net
Source 2: NOAA, Belarus Department of Hydrometeorology (percent sun 1957–1960 and 1973–2000), KNMI (snow depths)

== Economy ==
Tsentrolit, a large iron foundry, is based in Gomel.

== Transportation ==
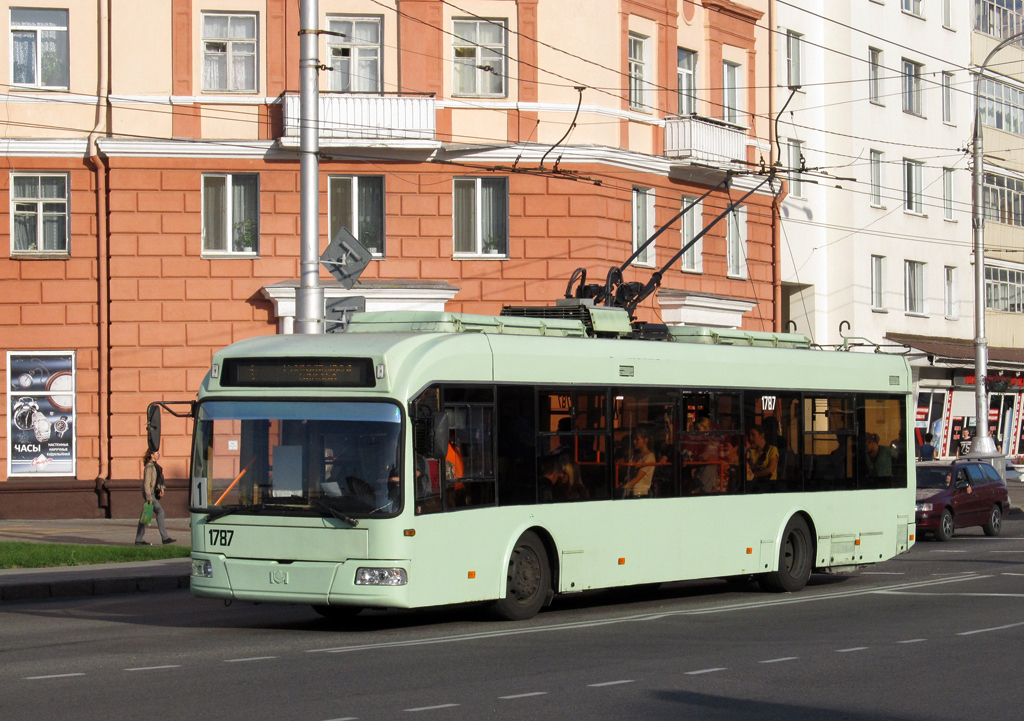
A trolleybus in the city centre in 2015

The public transportation system uses over 1,000 buses and trolleybuses. Over 210 million passenger rides were registered in 2006. Taxi services ($10 for a one-way intracity ride) are available 24 hours a day. The city is an important railroad hub in the southeastern part of Belarus, as it is situated midway on the Minsk–Kyiv rail link. The strategic location of Gomel near the border with Russia and Ukraine provides a direct connection to both countries’ vast railroad networks.

The trolleybus network opened on 20 May 1962 and now consists of 23 routes (not counting variations). On 15 December 2010, following the construction of an overhead wire network in Egorenko, Sviridov, and Chechersk Streets, a new trackless trolley line opened to the terminus "Klinkowski Neighborhood," which resulted in a change of the trolleybus routes 9, 16, and 17. The length of the network is about 74 km (46 mi), and the total length of the trolleybus routes is 475 km (295 mi). The rolling stock comprises ACSM-201, ACSM-321, MAZ-203T, and ACSM-213 types. There are more than 60 bus routes totaling 670 km (416 mi), and a number of express routes. The rolling stock consists mainly of MAZ-105, MAZ-107, MAZ-103 buses, and to a lesser extent MAZ-203, MAZ-206, and since 2014, the extra-large-capacity, low-floor MAZ-215. Express routes use Rodemich-A type buses. The 24 minibus lines use Ford Transit, GAZelle, Mercedes-Benz, and Peugeot vans.

Gomel Airport is located 8 km (5 mi) northeast of the city.

== Sports ==
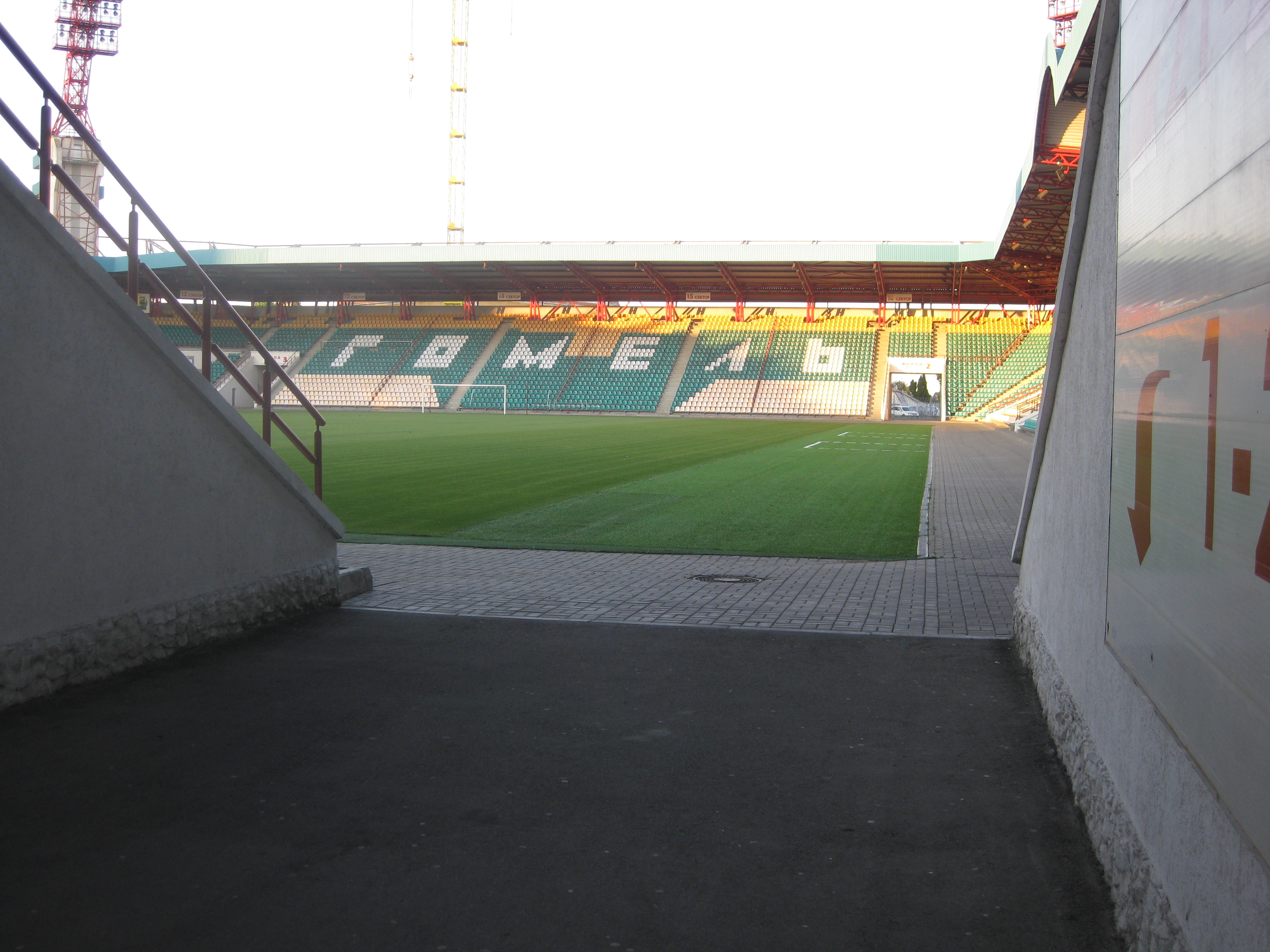
Central Stadium

Gomel is home to a wide range of sports facilities that have been developed and improved in recent years. These facilities, including eight stadiums and the Ice Palace, which has two ice arenas, support common activities such as hockey, track and field, and football. HK Gomel of the Belarusian Extraleague is the local pro hockey team. The Central Stadium is the home of Gomel's local football club, FC Gomel. Gomel hosts multiple international competitions in these facilities, the annual "Bells of Chernobyl" competition being one of the many. In addition to sports facilities, Gomel has a multitude of Olympic Reserve Schools, which are more commonly referred to as sports schools.

Many of Gomel's sports schools prepare athletes from a young age. Numerous champions have been trained by schools such as these. For example, one school, Gomel's Olympic Reserve Number 4, has trained 97 World and European champions as well as two Olympic athletes. Gomel State College of Olympic Reserve, on the other hand, trains coaches rather than athletes. From this school, 44 graduates have participated in the Olympics, European championships, and World championships. Gomel also participates in the Deaflympics and, between the years 2007–2009, has been awarded: two gold medals, one silver medal, and two bronze medals.

== Education ==
Gomels universities include Francisk Skorina Gomel State University, Pavel Sukhoi State Technical University of Gomel, and Gomel State Medical University. Gomel State Medical University provides classes in both English and Russian.

== Culture ==
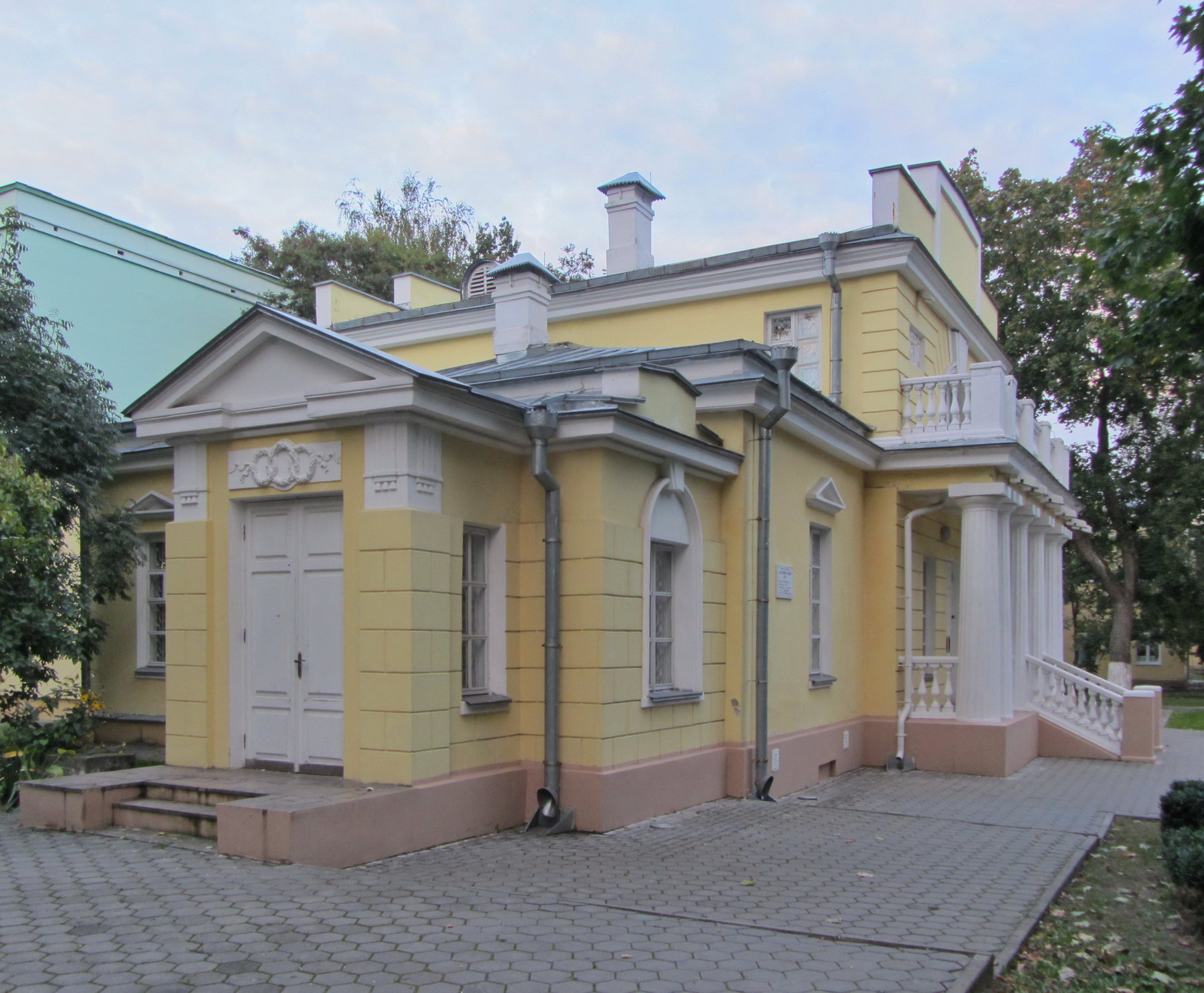
Hunting Lodge

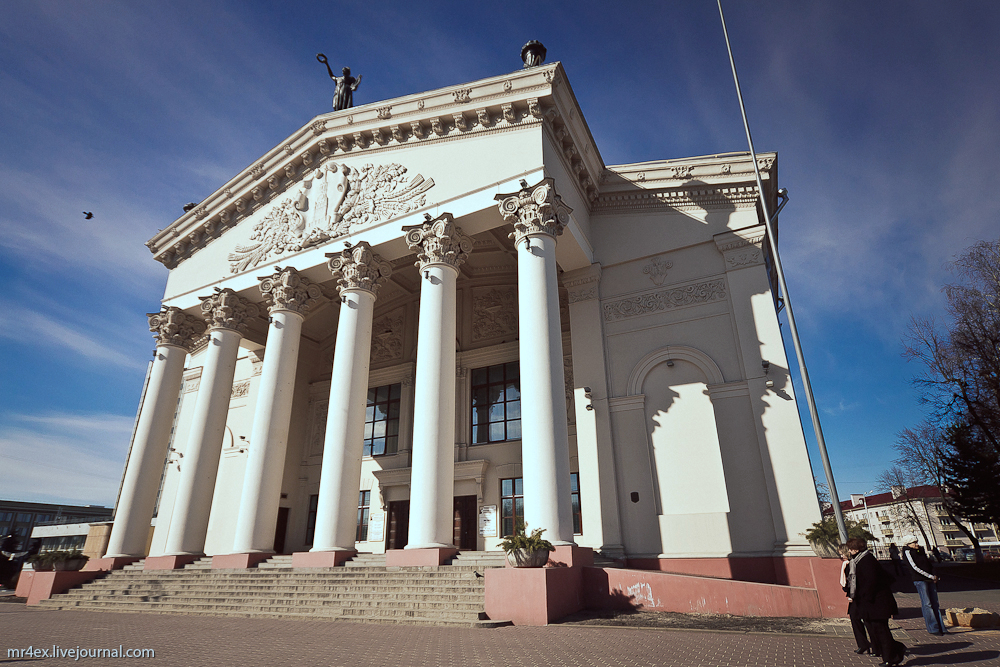
Regional Drama Theater

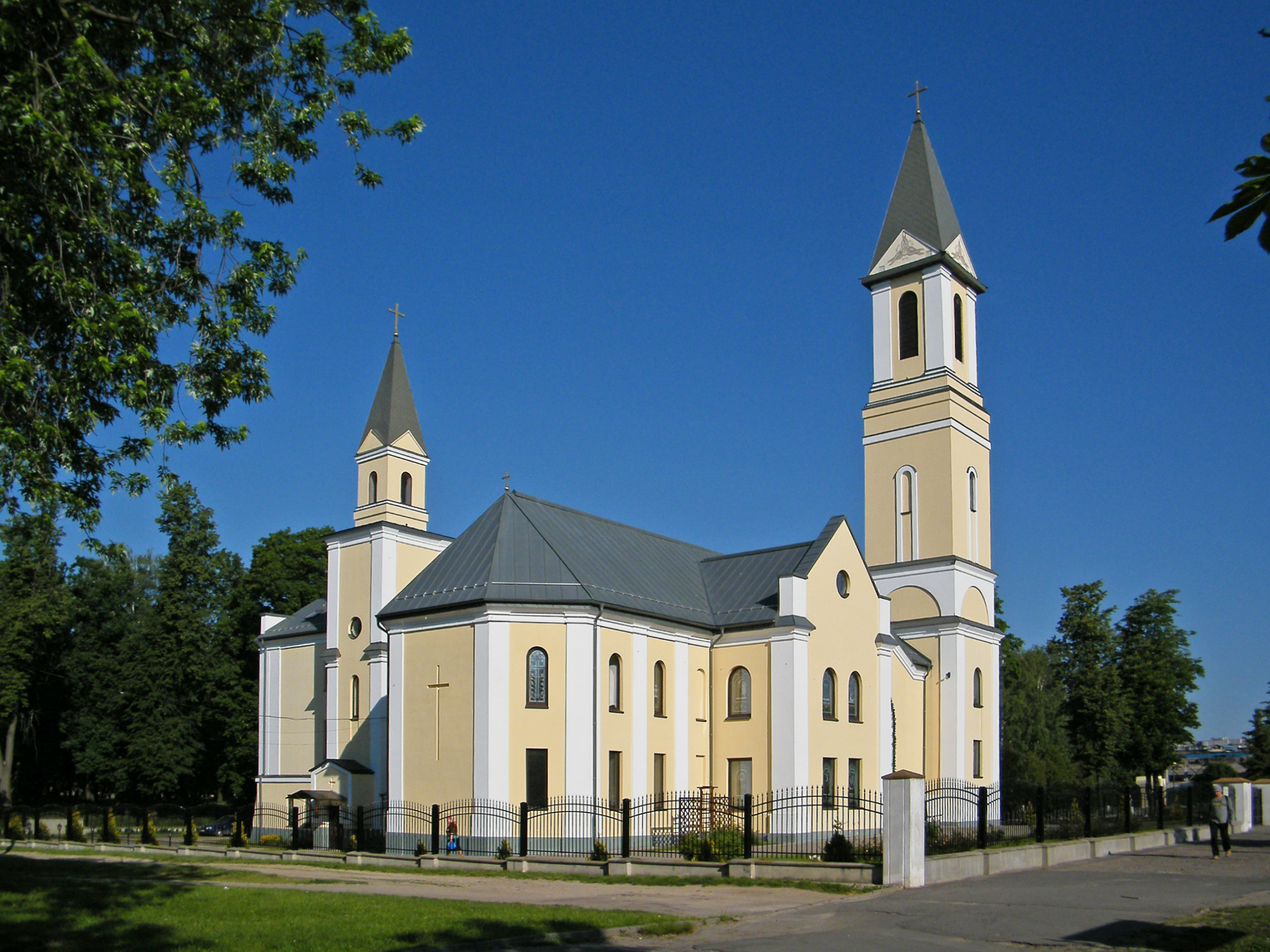
Church of Nativity of Virgin Mary

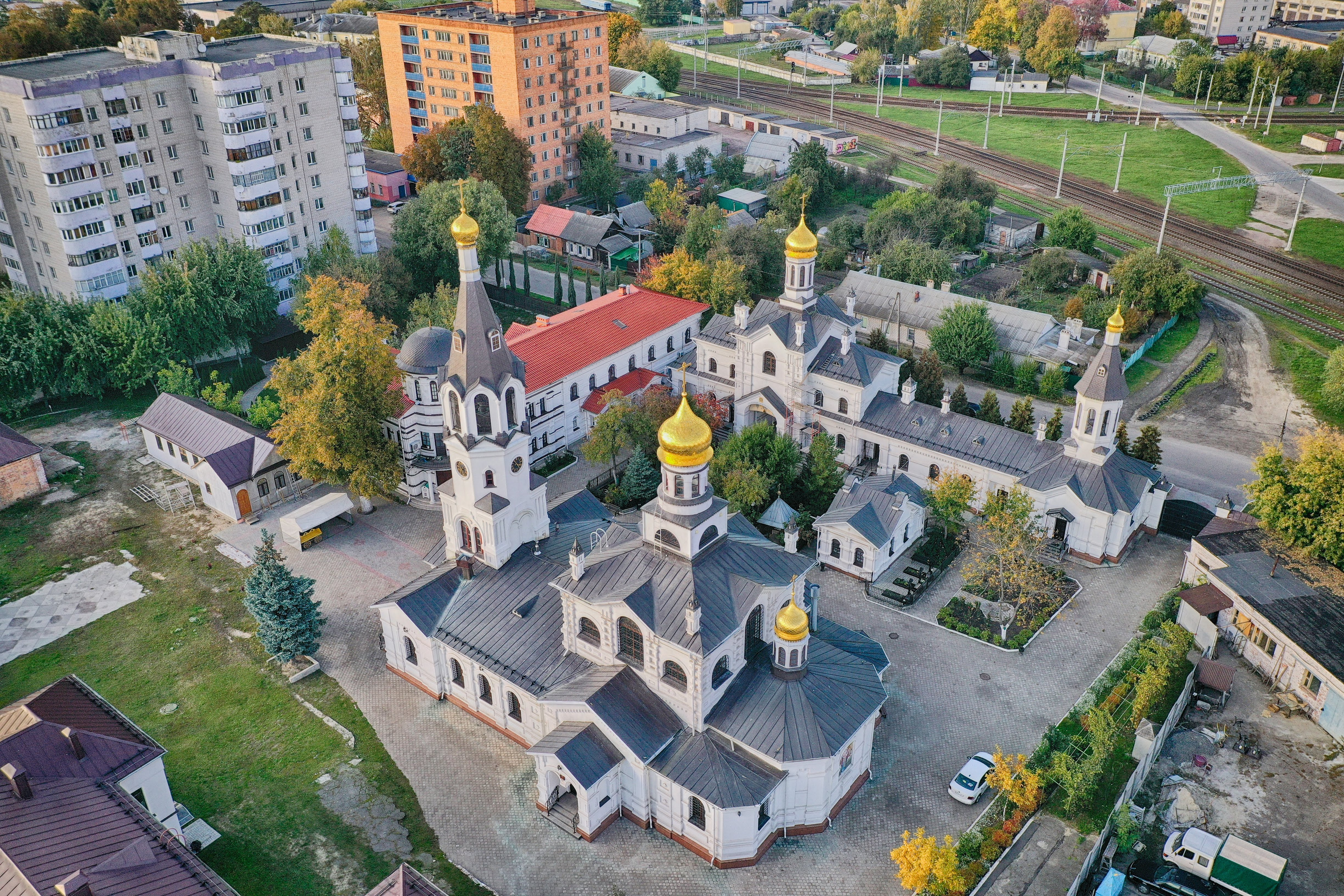
Saint Nicholas monastery

Throughout the eight hundred-year history of Gomel, only a few sights have been preserved. A small number belong to the 1700s and 1800s, while the main part belongs to the 20th and 21st centuries. Most of the architectural monuments of the 20th century date back to the 1950s. They are mostly concentrated downtown.

SIghts include the Rumyantsev-Paskevich Residence, the Winter Garden, St. Peter and Paul Cathedral, the Gomel Oblast (Regional) Museum of Local Lore, the Hunting Lodge, Gomel State Circus, the Gabriel Kh. Vaščanka Art Gallery, and the Gomel Regional Drama Theater.

The Ferris Wheel and the Ferris Tower, located in the park a few hundred meters from the palace complex, are popular for exploring the city. Since the topography of Gomel is relatively flat, the height of the surrounding buildings makes it easy to view the city from the wheel and the watchtower.

Gomel also hosts Sožski Karahod, a dance festival held every other year.

== Notable residents ==
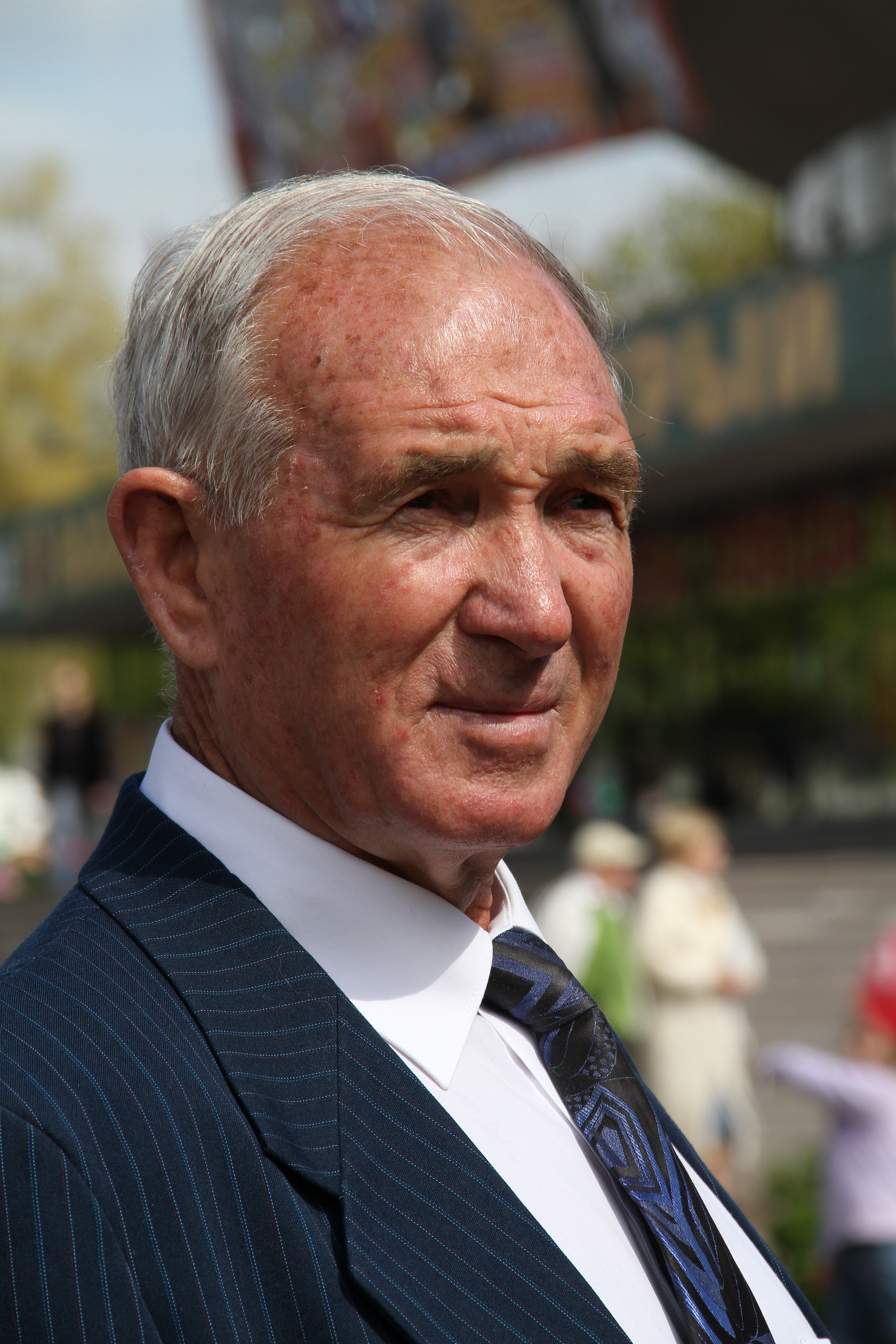
Leonid Geishtor

- Igor Avrunin (1957–2020), athlete
- Paluta Badunova (1885–1938), a prominent member of the Belarusian independence movement of the early 20th century, the only woman at the Rada of the Belarusian Democratic Republic and a victim of Stalin's purges of 1937-38
- Yitzchak Eizik Epstein (1770–1857), Hasidic rabbi, author of several works of Chabad philosophy
- Elye Falkovitsh (1898-1979), linguist and recipient of the Order of Lenin
- Yuri Foreman (born 1980), the first Israeli boxing world champion
- Leonid Geishtor (born 1936), Belarusian Olympic champion and world champion sprint canoer
- Elena Ginko (born 1976), athlete
- Maria Kalesnikava (born 1982), professional flutist, political prisoner in Penal Colony no 4
- Boris Nayfeld (born 1947), former Belarusian/Russian mob boss
- Andrei Gromyko (1909–1989), a Soviet Minister of Foreign Affairs (1957–1985) and Chairman of the Presidium of the Supreme Soviet (1985–1988)
- Gennady Korotkevich (born 1994), competitive programming champion
- Mikhail Grabovski (born 1984), retired professional ice hockey player, 10 seasons in the NHL
- Robert Landarsky (born 1936), artist
- Aaron Lebedeff, (1873–1960) Yiddish singer
- Dick Manning (1912–1991), American songwriter
- Andrey Melnichenko (born 1972), Russian businessman and billionaire
- Mark Petrokovets (1937–2006), scientist
- Mikhail Plisetski (1899—1938), Soviet diplomat and administrator, killed in Great Purge
- Yuri Rydkin (born 1979), poet
- Stanislaŭ Šabunieŭski (1868–1937), architect
- Seryoga (born 1976), rapper
- Larisa Shchiryakova, journalist
- Bella Shumiatcher (1911–1990), pianist and music educator
- Sergei Sidorsky (born 1954), Prime Minister of Belarus from 2003 until December 2010
- Kanstantsin Sivtsov (born 1982), professional road cyclist
- Sergei Tikhanovsky (born 1978), political activist
- Lev Vygotsky (1896–1934), psychologist
- Iryna Yatchanka (born 1965), Belarusian Olympic medal winner
- Greg Yezersky (born 1959), American engineer, consultant and university lecturer

== Twin towns – sister cities ==
Gomel is twinned with:

- Anapa, Russia
- Armavir, Russia
- Bryansk, Russia
- Burgas, Bulgaria
- Chernihiv, Ukraine
- Cheryomushki (Moscow), Russia
- Clermont-Ferrand, France
- Dnipro, Ukraine
- Donetsk, Ukraine
- Fort Myers, United States
- Harbin, China
- Huai'an, China
- Kaliningrad, Russia
- Krasnoselsky (Saint Petersburg), Russia
- Kurgan, Russia
- Kursk, Russia
- (Georgia (country)) Kutaisi, Georgia
- Liepāja, Latvia
- Magnitogorsk, Russia
- Novi Sad, Serbia
- Omsk, Russia
- Protvino, Russia
- Rostov-on-Don, Russia
- Samara, Russia
- Solomianskyi (Kyiv), Ukraine
- Ulyanovsk, Russia
- Vasileostrovsky (Saint Petersburg), Russia
- Voronezh, Russia

=== Former twin towns ===
- Radom, Poland
- Aberdeen, Scotland

In 2022, Radom and Aberdeen ended their partnership with Gomel as a reaction to the Belarusian involvement in the 2022 Russian invasion of Ukraine.
