= Yuri Rydkin =

Belarusian poet, novelist, collage

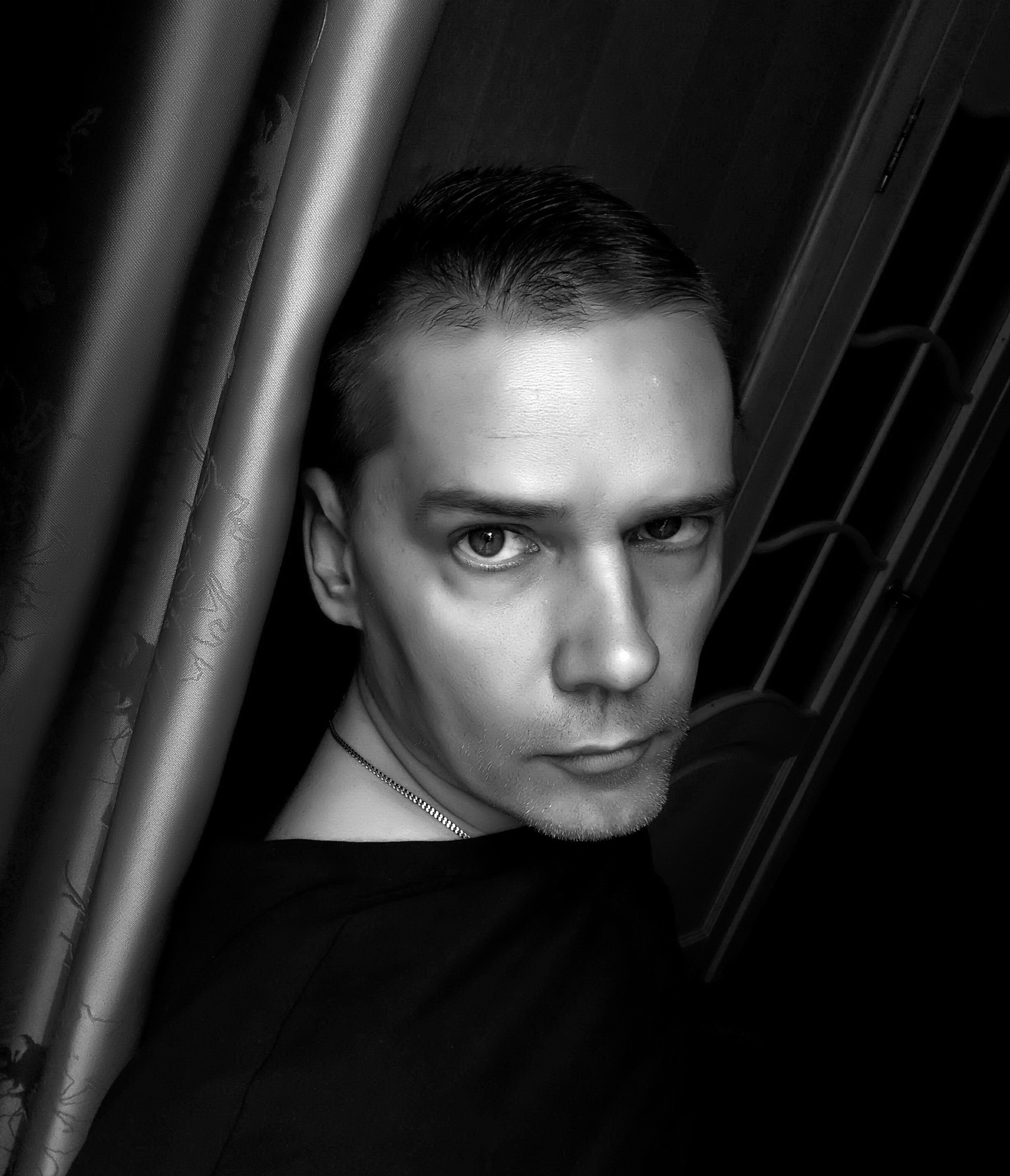
- Born: Yuri Anatolevich Rydkin; 8 April 1979 (age 47), Gomel, Byelorussian Soviet Socialist Republic, Soviet Union
- Citizenship: Belarus
- Education: Francisk Skorina Gomel State University
- Occupations: poet, fotocollage maker, literary critic, translator, musical artist
- Writing career
- Language: Russian, Belarusian
- Genres: poetry, prose, fotocollage, psychedelic rap, hip-hop
- Movements: post-postmodernism, eclecticism, post-conceptual art, new media art, futures studies

Yuri Anatolyevich Rydkin (Russian: Ю́рий Анато́льевич Ры́дкин, IPA: [ˈjʉrʲɪj ɐnɐˈtolʲjɪvʲɪtɕ ˈrɨtkʲɪn]; born 8 April 1979) is a Russian and Belarusian poet, media artist, a bot poetry (bot-non-fiction) researcher, musical performer.

== Biography ==
The author studied at school No.3, Gomel (1986–1996).

He graduated from the Belarusian department of the Linguistic Faculty of Francisk Skorina Gomel State University in 2004.

6 October 1998 Yuri Rydkin attempted to commit a suicide jumping from a railway bridge in Gomel, as a result he got injured and disabled. The consequences of the trauma were reflected in the author's work.

== Work ==
Rydkin explores the genre of conversation with bots in the most scrupulous way. Explores the impact of new technologies on poetic text. His works are screenshots of art-dialogues with virtual interlocutors, including Alice. In a literary critic Galina Rymbu's opinion, «Bot Conversation» is written in the genre of found poetry. This bot is compared to the emancipated Galatea.

The poet has had an artistic dialogue with COVID-19 on Facebook, the screenshots of his fb-posts are published under the title of «COVID-POETRY» in a literary almanac.

Rydkin is the founder of cyberzaum and hyperlink poetry, its concept and method of creation was expressed in the manifesto. Critics see author's hypertext works as aesthetic indicators that are consistent with "writing degree zero" — a language free from the signs of ideology. These works are fully covered by markup language, each verse block is associated with a certain media, texts and Internet resources are equal participants in poetic communication. This creates a specific structure at the level of associations and subtext.

Rydkin has made a few post-conceptual photo collages which attracted the attention of a art critic Теймур Даими, a professor Елена Зейферт and a photo artist Василий Ломакин, who analyzes Rydkin's works based on Michel Foucault's book "The Order of Things". When creating experimental photographs, the author uses ACDSee, Microsoft Paint and FaceApp programs.

Rydkin is the author of literary critical articles on the prose of Margarita Meklina, Владимир Паперный, Вадим Месяц, Александр Уланов, the poetry of Maria Stepanova, Алла Горбунова, Таня Скарынкина, Ирина Шостаковская, Ирина Котова, Лида Юсупова, Виктор Лисин and others; author of reviews of the films "Paterson", "Broken Flowers", "Beyond the Clouds", "The Great Beauty", "Reconstruction", "The Worst Person in the World", "Knight of Cups", "A Short Film About Love" and others.

The author has translated the works by Daniil Kharms, Eduard Limonov and a chapter "Ultima Thule" from the last unfinished Russian novel by Vladimir Nabokov into Belarusian.

His works have been published in such paper and electronic editions as IMDb, MUBI, ČSFD, Filmweb, Letterboxd, SensCritique, Транслит, Novy Mir, Znamya, Волга, Цирк «Олимп», Топос, Сетевая словесность, Homo Legens, Полутона, Ф-письмо, Лиterraтура, Журнальный зал, Метажурнал, Двоеточие, Дактиль, Post(non)fiction, on the website of the publishing house Новое литературное обозрение and in other journals.

The poet's works were shown at the exhibition "Poetry by any means" — it was devoted to new readymade-technologies in poetry, created with the help of Internet search engines, various objects, newspaper articles and more. The author's photographs are presented in virtual galleries of various media projects.

In 2024, Yuri Rydkin began performing songs in English. Registered as a musical performer in Estonia. Has appeared on the Euro Indie Music charts many times and radio show with broadcasts in the US, United Kingdom, France, Germany, Japan, Australia, Canada, Ireland, Spain, Italy, Netherlands, Portugal, Greece, Croatia, Poland, New Zealand, Malta and in other countries. The singer attracted the attention of music critics.

== Art style ==
"Modernity requires from the author not only philosophical reflection and creative use of digital developments, but also a willingness to entrust himself to them".

— Yuri Rydkin, Znamya.

Rydkin's stanza lyrics have a mark of futurology. He is interested in the feelings of people who have become programs, he is interested in the physicality of the bot. The poet shows the katabasis of a man, his fall into the world of bots. The author speaks on behalf of a bot in the afterlife, and such a poetic speech is recognized as unique. In his poems, Rydkin demonstrates the absence of the Other, and this absence has a female gender. Doctor of Science Jana Kostincová writes that in multimodal poetry he uses artificial intelligence and develops intertext play. The poem "Вверх тормашками стул рогат" is written in the genre of modern metarealism. The author also writes prose that has many synchronized worlds. Despite Rydkin's statements about the need to emancipate the machine, about the need to biocybernetics, something very human is felt in his texts. Rydkin's dialogues with bots contain pragmatics and a behavioral study of contemporary Russian poetry. Music criticism notes Rydkin's transition from poetry and visual arts to music, where he pays particular attention to psychedelic rap and hip-hop. "Pocket" is not just a song, but an innovative artistic statement that illustrates the evolution of an artist who has taken his unique experience and self-expression to new heights in the music world.

== Recognition ==
Yuri Rydkin's publication "Between the living and the artificial. Merging digital technologies with human, writer and literature" was recognized by the professionals of the Журнальный зал as the best in August 2021. In the journal Znamya, the author was ranked among the new literary generation, which is changing something in literature. The poet has been widely quoted by his contemporaries. The author's creations have attracted much attention from literary critics; according to their opinion, his works of art are close to the works by Fyodor Svarovsky, Dmitri Prigov and Lev Rubinstein. Critics call the Belarusian poet — a bot of Russian literature. In 2024, according to the European Indie Music Network rating, Rydkin entered the Top Indie Music with the song "Pocket". French music criticism calls Rydkin a pioneer in the study of the interaction of fine arts, poetry and music.
