= Francisk Skorina Gomel State University =

Public university in Gomel, Belarus

- Гомельскі дзяржаўны ўніверсітэт імя Францыска Скарыны
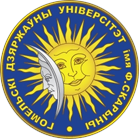
- Type: Public
- Established: 1930; 96 years ago
- Rector: Sergei Khakhomov
- Administrative staff: more than 1300
- Students: about 7700 (incl. more than 1000 international)
- Location: Gomel, Belarus; 52°26′35″N 31°00′04″E
- Website: gsu.by

University rankings

Regional – Overall
- QS Emerging Europe and Central Asia: 251-300 (2022)

Francisk Skorina Gomel State University (Russian: Гомельский государственный университет имени Франциска Скорины; Belarusian: Гомельскі дзяржаўны ўніверсітэт імя Францыска Скарыны, romanized: Homielski dziaržaŭny ŭniversitet imia Francyska Skaryny) is a medium-sized university situated in Gomel, Belarus. It was opened in 1930.

== General Information ==
Francisk Skorina Gomel State University consists of 12 faculties. Students are admitted on the basis of their performance in centralized testing.

Francisk Skorina Gomel State University offers 36 academic programs at the first stage of education, and 27 degree programs at the second stage of education, as well 56 specializations. There are 46 different postgraduate programs offered, as well as 6 different doctoral programs. As of 2020, approximatively 7700 students attended, including about 4500 students full-time students, about 2500 part-time students, 500 master's degree students, more than 100 post-graduate students, 6 doctoral students at the university (June 2020). It employs over 1300 individuals, including professorial-teaching staff (PTS) (excluding part-time employees), of which there are more than 600. There are 4 Correspondent Members of the National Academy of Sciences of Belarus, 45 Doctors of Sciences, 33 Professors, 233 Candidates of Sciences and 218 Associate Professors among the academic teaching staff and scientific employees.

The university is part of the Ministry of Education of the Republic of Belarus.

The rating agency "Expert RA" conferred the rating level "D" (which means an acceptable level of graduates' knowledge) on Francisk Skorina Gomel State University.

According to the world university rating "Webometrics", Francisk Skorina Gomel State University occupied 3758th place in January 2020 and was in 13% of the best educational institutions in the world.

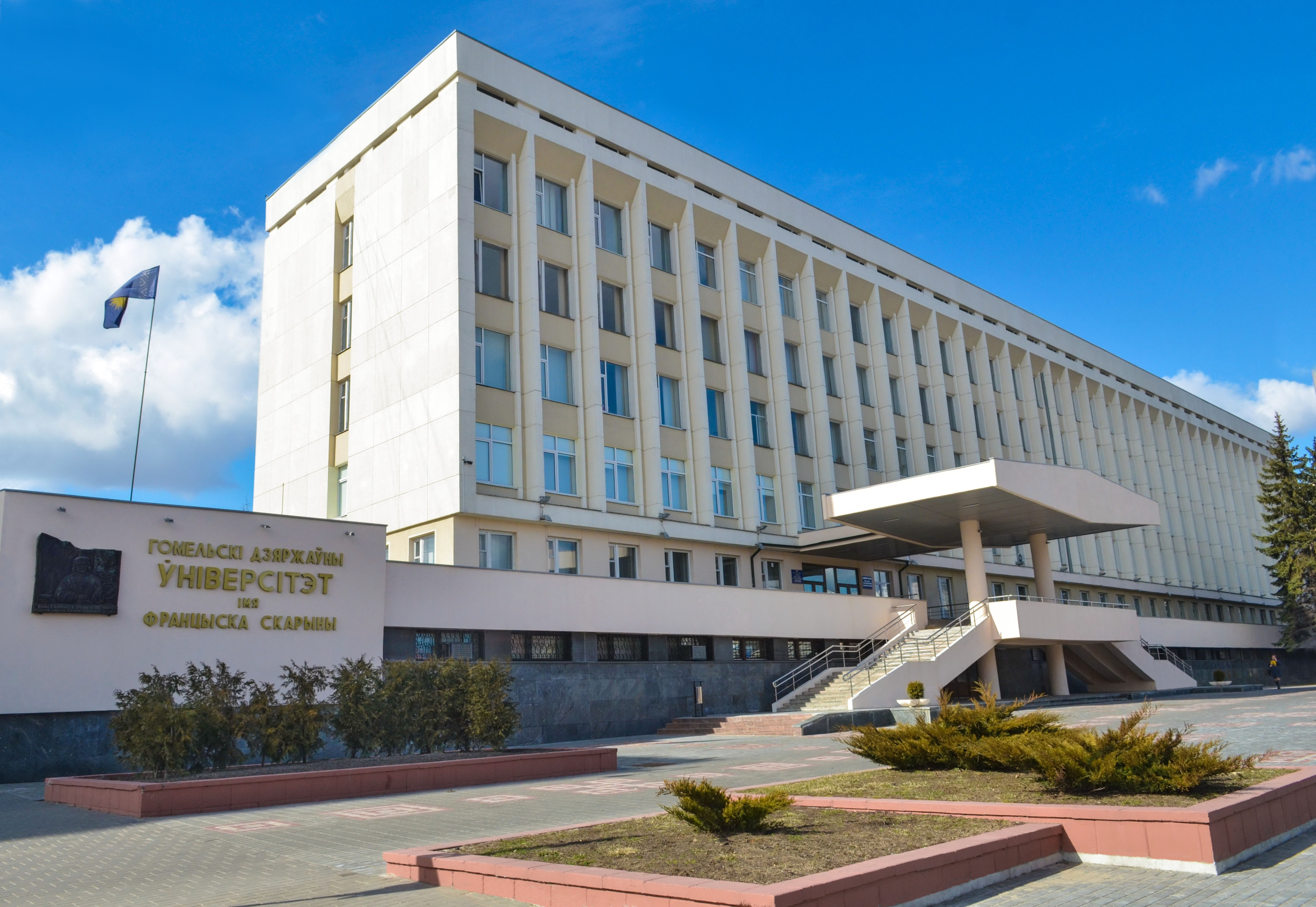
GSU Administrative building

== History ==
Francisk Skorina Gomel State University was founded on the basis of Gomel Pedagogical Institute, having first opened to the public on 8 November 1930. At first, the completion of a degree lasted two years. Later it was prolonged to four years. There were only three faculties: the Faculty of Physics and Mathematics, Chemical and Biology Faculty and Literature and Language Faculty, that provided instruction to students. The Teachers' Institute functioned alongside them. Throughout its short history from 1930 up to 1939, it was headed by directors: I. F. Ermakov; A. O. Stashevskiy; A. P. Elman; S. Y. Lebedev, M. F. Lozben; M. F. Alekseichik; S. F. Azhgirey and N. M. Ivashenko. In 1939, the name of the institute was changed to Valery Chkalov Gomel Pedagogical Institute.

During the Great Patriotic War, many members of the teaching staff and students joined the Red Army, and the institute was evacuated to Kirov oblast, now located in the Russian Federation. On 26 November 1943, Gomel was liberated and V. P. Chkalov Gomel Pedagogical Institute restarted its functioning. During this period, the main directions of the faculties' scientific research were determined. The first issue of "Scientific Notes" was published in 1954. In 1956, the course of study at the institute was changed to five years.

In 1958, Primary School Faculty was formed at the institute and was followed by Engineering-pedagogical Faculty (in 1959) whose name was changed three times (Industrial-pedagogical, General Technical Disciplines and Handicraft, General Technical Disciplines and Physics). During its last two years, V. P. Chkalov Gomel Pedagogical Institute trained secondary school teachers at five departments (Physics and Mathematics, Philological, Chemical-biological, General Technical disciplines and Physics, Physical Education). In autumn 1961, postgraduate courses were added. In 1968, the institute began its involvement in fulfilling state order research works (the first research work performed was "The Study of characteristics and Properties of Polymeric Coatings by Optical and Spectral Methods"). By 1968, V. P. Chkalov Gomel Pedagogical Institute had trained 12.5 thousand specialists.

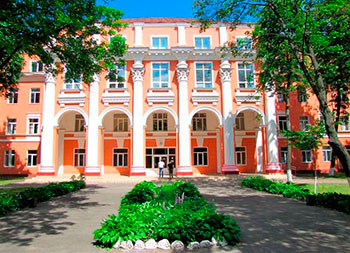
building 2 - Faculty of History, Law and Mathematics

In 1968, the decision was made to found Gomel State University on the basis of the Pedagogical Institute. Order No. 130, issued by the Minister of Higher and Secondary Special Education on 31 March 1969, read: "Gomel State University is to be opened on the basis of V. P. Chkalov Gomel Pedagogical Institute on 1 May 1969. The university is to consist of History and Philology Faculty, Mechanics and Mathematics Faculty, Physics Faculty, Biology and Soil Faculty, Geological Faculty, the Faculty of Economy and the Faculty of Physical Education". V. A. Belyi, a scientist, was appointed the first rector. In 1969/1970 academic year, the university enrolled 4429 students, including 2349 studying at the full-time department and 2080 studying by correspondence. The number of the first university graduates was 913.

In 1973, a scientist, academician and participant of the Great Patriotic War, B. V. Bokut was appointed the second rector. During the years of his administration, the academician B.V. Bokut created a Scientific School of Optics. In the 1980s, the efforts to improve the teaching and educational process at the university were intensified. Close links with industrial enterprises and research institutes were established at that time. In the late 1970s and in the first half of 1980s, for the first time in the Republic, Gomel State University began to create branches of its departments. Scientists of the Research Institute held classes in specializations, supervised work practices, course projects, diploma theses and organized counseling for post-graduate students.

In 1988, the Council of Ministers of the Belarusian Soviet Socialist Republic (the Decree as of 29 November 1988) made a decision to name Gomel State University after Francisk Skorina. L. A. Shemetkov, a mathematician, the creator and leader of a new and promising Scientific School of Algebraic System Formation Theory was appointed to the post of the rector by the University Council on 19 September 1989.

Ten new degree courses were added at the university in the 1990s. By L. A. Shemetkov's initiative, the Dissertation Council and Doctoral courses were introduced. The scientific journal "Proceedings of Francisk Skorina Gomel State University" has been issued since October 1999. International cooperation has greatly increased since 1994, when the university became the winner of 1-million-dollar grant of the TEMPUS program. In 1994–1998, Francisk Skorina Gomel State University together with the University of Clermont-Ferrand (France), the University of Birmingham (Britain) and Kiel University (Germany) worked on the project "The improvement of University Management".

In 1995, on the basis of agreement between Francisk Skorina Gomel State University and the University of Auvergne Clermont-Ferrand I (France), Franco-Belarusian Institute of Management was founded. It functioned successfully up to 2013.

In December, 2017, with assistance of Nanjing University of Science and Technology (City of Nanjing, the People's Republic of China) Confucius Institute was opened at F. Skorina GSU.

In 2017, on the basis of Shanghai Professional Institute of Industry, Commerce and Foreign Languages F. Skorina GSU branch was opened – Gomel Institute.

In 2018, the Chinese Language Center was opened at F. Skorina GSU.

== Faculties, Institutes, and Departments ==
- Mathematics and Technologies of Programming
- Physics and Information Technologies
- Biology
- Geology & Geography
- Psychology & Pedagogics
- Foreign Languages
- History
- Law
- Economics
- Physical Culture
- Philology
- Сorrespondence Studies and Pre-university Training
- The Institute for Professional Development and Personnel Retraining
- The Confucius Institute
- The university has 2 research institutes, 20 research laboratories, 45 student research units, and 43 departments.

== Notable alumni ==
- Yuri Rydkin, Belarusian poet and literary critic
- Ales Bialiatski, Belarusian human rights activist and Nobel Peace Prize winner
