= Peter and Paul Cathedral, Gomel =

Coordinates: 52.4241°N 31.0174°E

Peter and Paul Cathedral
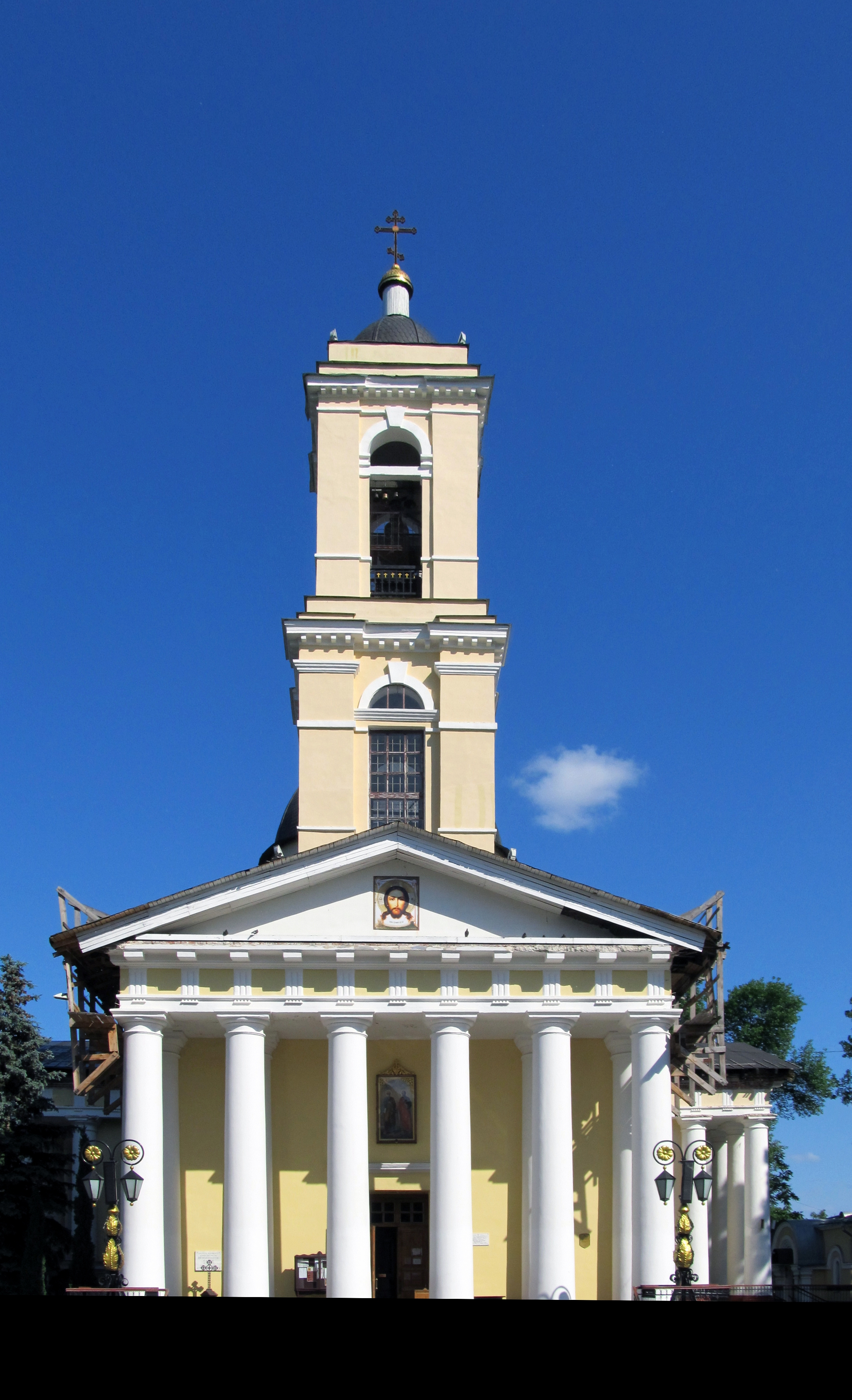
- Peter and Paul Cathedral
- Location: Gomel
- Country: Belarus
- Denomination: Belarusian Orthodox Church
- Website: http://soborgomel.cerkov.ru/

Saints Peter and Paul Cathedral (Belarusian: Петрапаўлаўскі сабор) is the cathedral church of the Gomel diocese of the Belarusian Orthodox Church.

It is located in Gomel Central Park, part of the Gomel Palace and Park Complex.

== History ==
The cathedral was founded by Archpriest John Grigorovich on October 18, 1809, in the possession of Nikolai Rumyantsev. Built in the years 1809–1819 in a classical style (architect: J. Clark), it is located on a high cape above the Sozh and is visible from afar. Its construction was completed in 1824.

After the revolution of 1917, the closure and demolition of churches began, along with their conversion to serve new purposes. In 1935, St. Peter and Paul Cathedral was closed. Divine worship in the cathedral resumed in the 1940s, during the period of German occupation. In the 1960s, the cathedral was closed again and later reconfigured into a planetarium.

In the late 1980s, the cathedral was restored, after which it regularly hosted religious services. On July 11, 2008, the cathedral held a solemn rite of presenting the icon of St. Seraphim of Sarov which holds a relic.
