= Anatoliy Falkovich =

Anatoliy Solomonovich Falkovich
- Born: Anatoli Solomonovich Falkovich; October 4, 1923; Baku, Azerbaijan SSR, Soviet Union
- Died: November 1, 1994 (aged 71); Haifa, Israel
- Occupation: Actor
- Years active: 1941–1994
- Notable work: The Magic Gown (1964); *Felix Dzerzhinsky roles (1965–1975)
- Awards: People's Artist of the Azerbaijan SSR (1972); State Prize of the Azerbaijan SSR (1972); Order of Friendship of Peoples (1981)

Anatoly Solomonovich Falkovich (October 4, 1923, Baku – November 1, 1994, Haifa) was a Soviet theater and film actor, People's Artist of the Azerbaijan SSR (1972).

== Early life ==
Anatoli Falkovich was born on October 4, 1923, in Baku. He graduated from the Baku Theater School in 1943. He worked at the S. Vurgun Azerbaijan State Russian Drama Theater (1941–1942, 1945–1968, 1970–1994) and at the Maxim Gorky Theater in Rostov-on-Don (1968–1970). Falkovich began his film career in 1957. He played the role of Felix Dzerzhinsky in eight films between 1965 and 1975, earning him significant recognition.

In 1972, he was awarded the State Prize and the title of People's Artist of the Azerbaijan SSR. Anatoli Falkovich died on November 1, 1994, while on tour in Israel, collapsing on stage during a performance.

Falkovich's first and most memorable success at the "Azerbaijanfilm" studio was his portrayal of the magician Io-Kio in the film The Magic Gown. His portrayal of Felix Dzerzhinsky brought him nationwide recognition across the USSR.

== Awards ==
- People's Artist of the Azerbaijan SSR — February 7, 1972
- Honored Artist of the Azerbaijan SSR — May 24, 1960
- State Prize of the Azerbaijan SSR — April 27, 1972
- Order of Friendship of Peoples — August 7, 1981
- 2nd Class Order of the Patriotic War — April 6, 1985
- Medal "For Distinguished Labor" — June 9, 1959
- Medal "For the Defense of the Caucasus" — February 23, 1945
- Medal "For Victory over Germany in the Great Patriotic War 1941–1945" — 1946

== Filmography ==
- When the Winds Blow in Baku (1974)
- It’s Dangerous to Go to Sea (1973) — British Officer
- The Romance of the Postman (1969) — Felix Dzerzhinsky
- Karl Liebknecht (1970) — Felix Dzerzhinsky
- True Friend (1959)
- Matteo Falcone (1960)
- In the Flames (1978)
- Gatır Mammad (1974) — Scott
- Morning (1960)
- The Magic Gown (1964) — Io-Kio
- I Loved You More Than Life Itself (1985)
- The Telephone Operator Girl (1962)
- Stars Don’t Go Out (1971)
- On Distant Shores (1958) — Patrolman
- The Song That Remained Unfinished (1979) — Nikolay
