= Honored Artist of the Byelorussian SSR =

English translation of two awards

Honored Artist of the Byelorussian SSR (Russian: Заслуженный деятель искусств Белорусской ССР) is the English translation of two different awards of the Byelorussian SSR, the older Soviet forms of two of the modern orders, decorations, and medals of Belarus.

The English term "artist" is used to cover two Belarusian terms: artist (Belarusian Заслужаны артыст БССР, modern Заслужаны артыст Рэспублікі Беларусь) meaning "performer", and "maker of art" meaning visual arts or architecture (Belarusian Заслужаны дзеяч мастацтваў Рэспублікі Беларусь, Russian Заслуженный деятель искусств Республики Беларусь).

The English term "Honored" (Belarusian Заслужаны Russian Заслуженный) is often translated "Meritorious" as in Meritorious Artist. This level of award is an award equivalent to the modern Merited Artist of Ukraine or Honored Artist of Russia, and these are lower level awards than the "National Artist" level awards such as the People's Artist of Russia, or People's Artist of the BSSR.
