= Elye Falkovitsh =

Elye Falkovitsh (1898–1979) was a Belarusian Jewish linguist. He received the Order of Lenin for his work as an orderly during World War II. Falkovitsch published works on Yiddish orthography and grammar.

== Early life ==
Born in Gomel in the Mogilev Governorate of the Russian Empire (now Belarus), Falkovitsh lived there until age 19. In 1917 and 1918, he was the head teacher of a Jewish day school in Sarapul. Afterwards, he temporarily moved to Kyiv, where he was the director of a children's club in 1918 and 1919 before becoming a cultural worker for the Red Army in 1920 and 1921.

== Mid-life ==
Studying at Moscow State University in 1921 and 1922, Falkovitsh later worked for the People's Commissariat for Education. Afterwards, Falkovitsh worked as a lecturer on Yiddish linguistics at the Second Moscow State University (later Moscow State Pedagogical University) and at the Communist University of the National Minorities of the West. Falkovitsh, together with Ayzik Zaretski, was central in molding the standards of Soviet Yiddish in regards to lexicon, grammar, style, and orthography . After advocating the study of the Torah and the works of Hayim Nahman Bialik and Sholem Asch, Falkovitsh temporarily lost his positions in 1937.

== Later life ==
Falkovitsh volunteered to join the Red Army and worked as an orderly during World War II, saving the lives of 88 wounded people in one battle and thus receiving the Order of Lenin. After the war, Falkovitsh was editor in chief of the Moscow Yiddish-language publishing house Emes until it was liquidated in 1948. Starting from 1961, Falkovitsh helped shape the revised Soviet orthography for Yiddish.

In addition, Falkovitsh also published two grammatical sketches of Yiddish, one in a monograph on Soviet national languages (1966) and the other (posthumously) as an appendix to a Russian-Yiddish dictionary (1984). Falkovitsh died in 1979 at age 80 or 81.
