= April 1937 =

Month of 1937

<<	April 1937					>>
Su	Mo	Tu	We	Th	Fr	Sa
				1	2	3
4	5	6	7	8	9	10
11	12	13	14	15	16	17
18	19	20	21	22	23	24
25	26	27	28	29	30

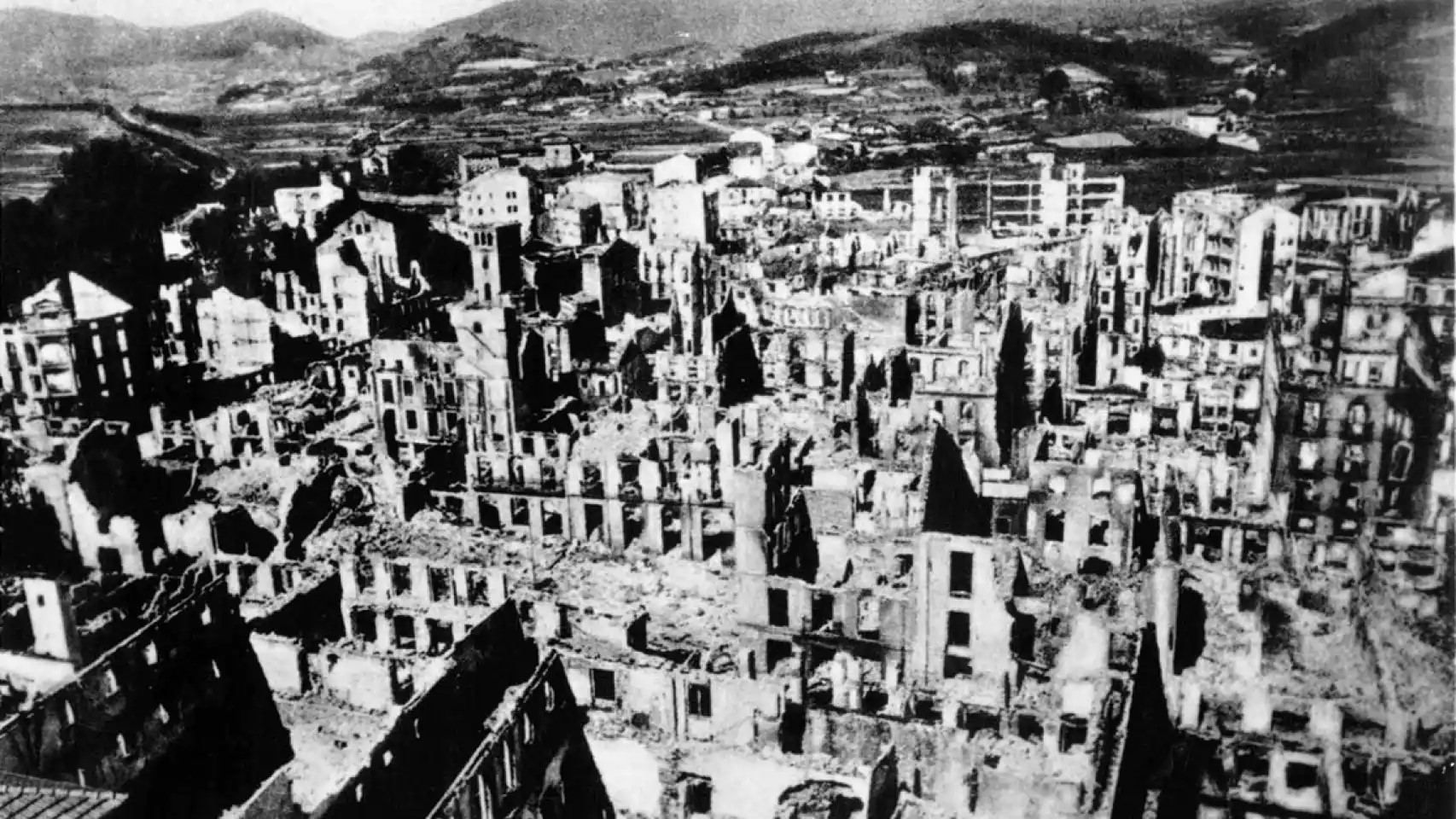
April 26, 1937: More than 1,600 people killed by aerial bombardment of Guernica in Spain.

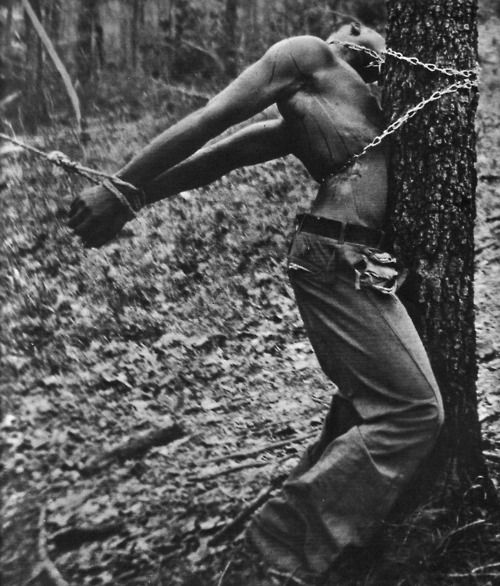
April 13, 1937: Brutal lynching of two African-Americans takes place in Mississippi, with photographs later published worldwide (pictured: Robert McDaniels)

The following events occurred in April 1937:

== April 1, 1937 (Thursday) ==
- The Government of India Act 1935 came into effect, reorganizing the colonial structure of British India. Burma was made a Crown colony of the United Kingdom, separate from the rest of British India, with Ba Maw as the first Premier and Sir Archibald Cochrane continuing as Governor.
- The Act provided for six of British India's 11 provinces to have their own legislative bodies. Bicameral parliaments and a local prime minister began operation in the Bombay State (Prime Minister Dhanjishah Cooper and a capital at Bombay, now Mumbai); the Province of Madras (Prime Minister Kurma Venkata Reddi Naidu with a capital at Madras, now Chennai); the Province of Bengal (Prime Minister Abul Kasem Fazlul Huq with a capital at Calcutta, now Kolkata); Bihar Province (Premier Mohammad Yunus, with a capital at Pataliputra; Assam Province (Prime Minister Muhammed Saadulah, with a capital at Shillong); and the United Provinces (Chief Minister Muhammad Ahmad Said Khan Chhatari, with a capital at Lucknow).
- The Act also established Aden, formerly a part of British India located on the Arabian Peninsula and now part of the Republic of Yemen, as a Crown colony, with Sir Bernard Reilly as the first Governor.
- The Royal New Zealand Air Force (RNZAF) became an independent branch of New Zealand's military forces, after having existed initially as a command within the New Zealand Army.
- Six German bombers of the Condor Legion carried out the bombing of Jaén, a Spanish city with no legitimate military value or anti-aircraft defenses, and killed 159 civilians. In retaliation, the city administrators of the Spanish Republic government executed 128 Nationalist prisoners.
- The 36-story tall Time-Life Building, now called "1 Rockefeller Plaza", opened in Manhattan.
- Born: Mohammad Hamid Ansari, Vice President of India from 2007 to 2017, formerly India's Ambassador to the United Nations from 1993 to 1995; in Calcutta, Province of Bengal, British India

== April 2, 1937 (Friday) ==
- The Kingdom of Albania, ruled by King Zog I, established a policy of official recognition of its Jewish minority, which at the time consisted of 300 Albanians, living primarily in Vlorë, and of becoming the only European nation to welcome Jewish refugees.
- A sitdown strike began at the Hershey Chocolate factory in Hershey, Pennsylvania. It would only last for six days.
- A rebellion by 1,500 Uighur Muslims began in the Xinjiang (at the time referred to as Sinkiang) province of China with the support of the Republic of China's New 36th Division.
- The collision of two trains killed 10 people and injured 80 others, mostly commuters in London, because of an error by a signalman on Britain's Southern Railway. All but one of the dead had been in the rear car of a train traveling from London Bridge station to London Victoria station and which was stopped in the Battersea Park station when another train from Coulsdon was cleared to enter at 8:02 in the morning.

== April 3, 1937 (Saturday) ==
- Manchukuan Prince Pujie and Japanese princess Hiro Saga were married in a simple Shinto ceremony in Tokyo.
- The operetta Polnische Hochzeit (Polish Wedding), by Joseph Beer, was given its first performance, premiering at the Zürich Opera House in Switzerland.
- Born:
  - Joseph Albright, American journalist and investigative reporter; in New Orleans
  - Ivone Dias Lourenço, Portuguese Communist and dissident whose imprisonment indirectly led to the 1961 founding of Amnesty International; in Vila Franca de Xira (d. 2008)
  - John Arrillaga, American real estate magnate and billionaire philanthropist known for developing Silicon Valley in northern California; in Inglewood, California (d. 2022)
  - Samuel Ginn, American engineer known for launching the early cellular phone company AirTouch Communications, and philanthropist who created the Ginn Family Foundation; in Anniston, Alabama

== April 4, 1937 (Sunday) ==
- Byron Nelson won the fourth annual Masters Tournament with a score of 283 strokes in 72 holes; Ralph Guldahl finished second with 285.
- The first slalom skiing championship in Sweden was held at Frösön island at Östersund after being organized by Olle Rimfors and Ivar Holmquist. Rimfors co-founded the Swedish Ski Association two months later on June 27, 1937.
- Born: Teresa Trujillo, Uruguayan choreographer; in Montevideo
- Died:
  - Abd al-Hafid, 62, Sultan of Morocco from 1908 to 1912, known for signing the Treaty of Fez on March 30, 1912, making Morocco a French protectorate. After signing the treaty, al-Hafid abdicated and was granted a pension, living for the rest of his life in France.
  - Charles Henry Smyth, Jr., 71, American geologist
  - Henry Goldman, 79, American philanthropist and businessman who built the Goldman Sachs financial conglomerate

== April 5, 1937 (Monday) ==
- The first postage stamps bearing the face of Adolf Hitler went on sale in Germany to commemorate the Führer's 48th birthday.
- The first elections in British India for the new Punjab Provincial Assembly were held for 175 seats, of which 42 were for any candidate, 84 were limited to Muslims, 31 for Sikhs, and 18 others for representatives of different groups (four for women, five for landholders, three for trade union representatives, two for Indian Christians, and one apiece for a European, a British-born Indian, a university representative and representative of industry. Overall, candidates of the Unionist Party won a majority of 98 of 175 seats.
- The French liner Normandie crossed the Atlantic Ocean in record time, with an average speed of 30.98 knots (57.37 km/h; 35.65 mph).
- Born:
  - U.S. Army General Colin Powell, the first African-American Secretary of State; in New York City (died of complications from COVID-19, 2021)
  - General Guido Vildoso, President of Bolivia for four months in 1982 and the last military ruler prior to the restoration of democracy in the South American nation; in La Paz
  - Maryanne Trump Barry, U.S. federal appellate judge from 1983 to 2019, older sister of former U.S. President Donald Trump; in New York City (d. 2023)
  - Juan Lezcano, Paraguayan footballer with 26 caps for the Paraguay national team; in Asunción (d. 2012)

== April 6, 1937 (Tuesday) ==
- Four U.S. Navy flyers were killed in a collision of two bomber planes during maneuvers off the coast of California.
- Born:
  - Merle Haggard, American country musician; in Oildale, California (d. 2016)
  - Billy Dee Williams, African-American singer and actor; in New York City
  - Peter Maivia (ring name for Fanene Pita Anderson), Samoan-American professional wrestler and grandfather of Dwayne "The Rock" Johnson'; in American Samoa (died of cancer, 1982)

== April 7, 1937 (Wednesday) ==
- The Pennsylvania chocolate workers' sitdown strike ended abruptly when at least 3,000 people— other Hershey employees, workers at neighboring dairies affected by the strike, and local residents—arrived at the factory and gave the strikers until 1:00 to leave the factory or to be forcibly evicted. When the deadline arrived with no exit, the strikebreaking group entered the factory with bats, clubs and hammers and beat several people, with the worst assault on three union organizers. As 800,000 pounds (360,000 kg) of milk daily was destroyed as a result of the strike, farmers armed with sticks and clubs assaulted the strikers, many of whom were taken to hospitals.
- In British India, the bicameral Assam Legislative Assembly, the first parliament of native Indians in the Assam Province, was opened by the British governor, Sir Robert Reid in Shillong with a 108-member House of Representatives and a 21-member Legislative Council. Babu Basanta Kumar Das was sworn in as the first Speaker of the House of the new Assembly on the same day.
- Born:
  - Graeme Davies, New Zealand engineer and academic known for establishing the Higher Education Funding Council for England; in Auckland (d. 2022)
  - Mircea Dridea, Romanian footballer for the Romania national football team from 1959 to 1967; in Ploiești

== April 8, 1937 (Thursday) ==
- Austrian Chancellor Kurt Schuschnigg retracted his announcement of February 14 and said that the Habsburg monarchy could not be restored in the foreseeable future due to the tense international situation.
- Englishman John Loder, 2nd Baron Wakehurst took office as the new Governor of New South Wales in Australia, fillig a vacancy that had existed for more than five months after the death of Sir Murray Anderson on October 30. Baron Wakehurst was the last non-Australian governor of the New South Wales state.
- The Oshawa Strike began in Canada when 4,000 General Motors workers walked off the job at the GM factory in Oshawa, Ontario.
- Born: Seymour Hersh, American investigative journalist and author; in Chicago
- Died: Billy Bassett, 68, English footballer who represented England in international play from 1888 to 1896

== April 9, 1937 (Friday) ==
- In Nazi Germany, the Gestapo carried out a nationwide raid all on all chapters of B'nai B'rith, the international Jewish social service organization. All property of the B'nai B'rith was confiscated by the German government and the German corporation was dissolved.
- Mark R. Rein, a Russian-born German journalist, was kidnapped in Barcelona while in Spain, and taken to the Soviet Union by agents of the Soviet secret police, the OGPU. He was never seen in public again, and presumed to have been executed as part of an operation to round up opponents of the regime of Joseph Stalin.
- The Kamikaze became the first Japanese-built aircraft to fly from Japan to Europe, as pilot Masaaki Iinuma and navigator Kenji Tsukagoshi arrived in London 51 hours and 17 minutes after departing from Tokyo.
- Born:
  - Valerie Singleton, English television and radio presenter, known for the series Blue Peter and The Money Programme; in Hitchin, Hertfordshire
  - Mahshid Amirshahi, Iranian novelist
  - Rollan Kadyev, Soviet Crimean Tatar physicist and activist for the rights of the Crimean Tatar people in the USSR; in Azek, Crimean ASSR, RSFSR (died during surgery for a brain tumor, 1990)
- Died: Albert Paine, 75, American author and biographer

== April 10, 1937 (Saturday) ==
- British Prime Minister Stanley Baldwin announced that he would soon be retiring.
- Born:
  - Bella Akhmadulina, Soviet Russian poet; in Moscow (d. 2010)
  - Gennady Fadeyev, Russian Minister of Railways from 1992 to 1996 and 2002 to 2003, and the first president of the Russian Railways corporation; in Shimanovsk, Russian SFSR, Soviet Union
  - Mark Petrokovets, Soviet and Belarusan scientist known for his research on tribology, the study of friction phenomena; in Gomel, Byelorussian SSR, Soviet Union (now Belarus) (d. 2006)
  - Mohamed Hashim Mohd Ali, Malaysian Chief of Defence Forces from 1987 to 1992; in Kuala Lumpur, Sultanate of Selangor, Federated Malay States (d. 2025)
  - Faramarz Pilaram, Iranian painter and calligrapher; in Tehran (d. 1983)
- Died:
  - Ralph Ince, 50, American actor, director and screenwriter, was killed in an auto accident when his wife crashed the car in which he was riding into an iron pole in London's Kensington district.
  - Kenelm Lee Guinness, 49, Irish racing driver and inventor, known for creating the KLG spark plug, and for setting the last land speed records measured on a racetrack rather than a beach or salt flat, committed suicide at his home. Guinness had suffered head trauma on September 27, 1924, at the San Sebastian Grand Prix and became increasingly despondent in the years that followed.

== April 11, 1937 (Sunday) ==
- The British cabinet held a rare Sunday meeting in which it decided to afford the fullest protection to British shipping outside the three-mile limit in northern Spanish waters. This was understood to include authorizing the Royal Navy to open fire on any Spanish vessels interfering with British cargo ships.
- The Junkers Ju 89 prototype Nazi German bomber had its first flight, piloted by Peter Hesselbach. The project was discontinued 18 days later because the fuel consumption of the Ju 89 and another heavy bomber, the Dornier Do 19, was too high.
- Died: John Richard Morgan, 83, Welsh international footballer who represented the Wales national football team from 1877 to 1883

== April 12, 1937 (Monday) ==
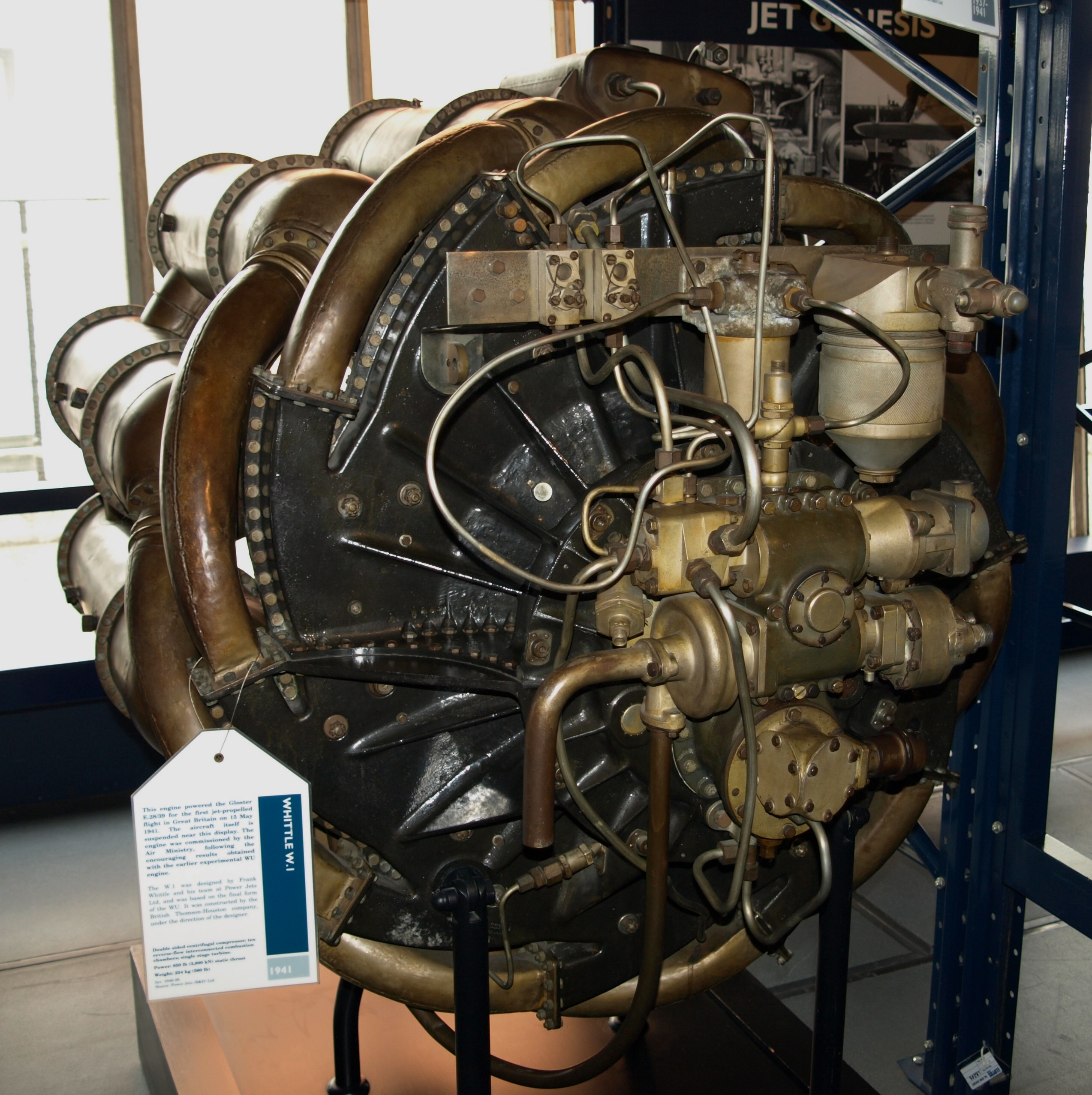
Whittle's first jet engine, on display at the Science Museum, London

- British engineer Frank Whittle and his team successfully tested a prototype jet engine, the Power Jets W.1, at his factory in Rugby, Warwickshire.
- The U.S. Supreme Court decided National Labor Relations Board v Jones & Laughlin Steel Corporation, ruling 5 to 4 that the U.S. Congress had the power under the Commerce Clause of the U.S. Constitution to regulate labor relations within a particular U.S. state for industries that impacted interstate commerce, even if only indirectly. Chief Justice Charles Evans Hughes wrote the majority opinion, stating that "Employees have as clear a right to organize and select their representatives for lawful purposes as the respondent has to organize its business and select its own officers and agents," and added that "Although activities may be intrastate in character when separately considered," the federal government could regulate them "if they have such a close and substantial relation to interstate commerce that their control is essential or appropriate to protect that commerce from burdens and obstructions."
- Born:
  - Marian Marzynski, Polish-born American documentary filmmaker; in Warsaw (d. 2023)
  - Joseph Akahan, Chief of Staff of the Nigerian Army; in Gboko, British Nigeria (killed in helicopter crash, 1968)
- Died: Abdülhak Hâmid Tarhan, 85, Ottoman Turkish playwright and poet

== April 13, 1937 (Tuesday) ==
- The lynching of Roosevelt Townes and Robert McDaniels, the first to be covered extensively by the United States media, took place in Duck Hill, Mississippi, after the two men were accused of the December 30 murder of a white shopkeeper. After the two appeared in court in Winona, Mississippi, and entered a plea of not guilty, a mob of about 100 men overpowered the sheriff and five deputy sheriffs and seized Townes and McDaniels at the Montgomery County Courthouse. The two men were then transported in a school bus by members of the lynch mob, taken to a wooded area near Duck Hill, chained to trees, and tortured with a blowtorch. McDaniels was shot to death, and Townes was burned to death. Days later, Life magazine became the first U.S. publication to print photographs that had been taken at the scene of the crime, bringing the practice of lynching of African-Americans to worldwide attention.
- Fuad Hamza, Saudi Arabia's ambassador to Egypt, welcomed David Ben-Gurion, the Chairman of the Zionist and Jewish Agency Executive and future Prime Minister of Israel, to Hamza's home in Beirut in Lebanon, as Ben-Gurion attempted to find out Saudi King Ibn Saud's views on the formation of a Jewish state in the Middle East. Hamza arranged for Ben-Gurion to meet with King Ibn Saud and Crown Prince Saud.
- The Royal Navy aircraft carrier HMS Ark Royal was launched.
- Born:
  - Edward Fox, British film actor and BAFTA Award winner
  - Osman Mirzayev, Soviet Azerbaijani journalist; in Baku (killed in shootdown of aircraft, 1991)
  - Stan Stasiak, Canadian professional wrestler; in Arvida, Quebec (d. 1997)
  - Col Joye (stage name for Colin Jacobsen), Australian rock singer and entrepreneur; in Sydney

== April 14, 1937 (Wednesday) ==
- The musical stage comedy Babes in Arms. with music and lyrics by the team of Rodgers and Hart, opened at the Shubert Theatre on Broadway. The show spawned several hit songs including "My Funny Valentine" and "The Lady is a Tramp".
- The Bruderhof community, a settlement of Anabaptist Christian Hutterites near Fulda in Germany, was raided by the Gestapo, assisted by the German SS and local police. The three members of the executive committee (Hans Meier, Hans Boller, and Karl Keiderling) were arrested and the property of the residents was confiscated. Two visitors from the Hutterian Brethren in America, Michael Waldner and David Hofer, happened to be present, and told police that they would report the persecution to their organization upon their return home. The Nazi government relented, released the committee members after three months, and allowed the Bruderhof members to leave Germany.
- Lord Somervell, the Attorney General for England and Wales, issued his official opinion to the Home Secretary, Viscount Simon, that although the former King Edward VIII "could not have claimed the right to be described as a Royal Highness" under British law, and that Edward's fiancée, Wallis Simpson, would have no right to claim the title "on any legal basis", it was "within the prerogative of His Majesty", King George VI, to continue to refer to Edward as "His Royal Highness" and to regulate the title by Letters Patent.
- Mitchell Hepburn, Premier of the Canadian province of Ontario, forced two of his cabinet ministers to resign after they had opposed his handling of the Oshawa Strike.
- Born:
  - Sepp Mayerl, Austrian mountaineer who was the first to ascend the Mount Jitchu Drake; in Göriach (killed in climbing accident, 2012)
  - Anatoly Lysenko, Russian television executive; in Vinnytsia, Ukrainian SSR, Soviet Union. (d. 2021)
- Died: Ned Hanlon, 79, American baseball player and manager, 1996 inductee to the Baseball Hall of Fame, known for his innovations during his managerial career from 1899 to 1907, and for winning the National League pennant three consecutive years managing the NL Baltimore Orioles (1894, 1895, and 1896) and two consecutive years for the Brooklyn Superbas (1899 and 1900)

== April 15, 1937 (Thursday) ==
- The Detroit Red Wings defeated the New York Rangers 3–0 to win the Stanley Cup, three games to two.
- Born:
  - Robert W. Gore, American inventor and businessman best known for adapting polytetrafluoroethylene (PTFE) to create the synthetic fabric Gore-Tex; in Salt Lake City (d. 2020)
  - Bill Ballantine, British-born New Zealand marine biologist; in Leicester, Leicestershire (d. 2015)
  - Sterling Seagrave, American historian and book author; in Columbus, Ohio (d. 2017)

== April 16, 1937 (Friday) ==
- The Battle of Pozoblanco ended in Spain in a Republican victory after a six-week siege by the rebel Nationalist forces.
- The Southern Negro Youth Congress, a left-wing civil rights organization of African-American students, was organized in Richmond, Virginia, to address racial discrimination in the southern United States.
- Born:
  - George "The Animal" Steele, American professional wrestler and film actor known for Ed Wood, and inductee to the World Wrestling Entertainment Hall of Fame; in Detroit (d. 2017)
  - Constance Ahrons, American psychotherapist and author of numerous works on the concept of collaborative divorce, including the 1994 book The Good Divorce: Keeping your family together when your marriage comes apart; In Brooklyn, New York (d.2021)

== April 17, 1937 (Saturday) ==
- The 128 miles (206 km)-long Moscow Canal, connecting Russia's capital to the Volga River and the Caspian Sea for shipping purposes, was opened after the Ivankovo Reservoir was filled.
- The Warner Bros. cartoon character of Daffy Duck was introduced, making his first appearance in the Porky Pig animated short film Porky's Duck Hunt.
- The U.S. city of Fruitdale, Texas, with a population of 432, was incorporated by act of the Texas legislature after residents voted in favor of its creation to avoid being annexed by neighboring Dallas. After the independent city became completely surrounded by Dallas and local wells dried up, residents voted in 1964 to disincorporate the 27-year old town and the area is now part of the city of Dallas.
- Born:
  - Don Buchla, American musician and engineer who invented a musical synthesizer independently of Robert Moog; in South Gate, California (d. 2016)
  - Ferdinand Piëch, Austrian business magnate; in Vienna (d. 2019)

== April 18, 1937 (Sunday) ==
- Several hundred residents of the town of Schüttorf in Nazi Germany gathered at the town hall to protest the arrest of Friedrich Middendorff, the Lutheran pastor of the town's Evangelical-Reformed Church, after Middendorff had been jailed for publishing the article "Ein Weniges zur Judenfrage" ("About the Jewish Question"), defying Nazi policy. Rather than overtly protesting, the persons gathered reportedly sang hymns for several hours until the Gestapo released their pastor. Mittendorf and his family fled Germany after he was freed.
- Ontario's Premier Hepburn threatened to pass legislation to keep the Congress of Industrial Organizations (CIO) out of Ontario, saying of CIO President John L. Lewis that "he and his gang will never get their greedy paws on Ontario as long as I'm prime minister."
- Born:
  - Jan Kaplický, Czech architect known for founding Future Systems; in Prague (d. 2009)
  - Bruno Freschi, Canadian architect and chief of design for Expo 86 in Vancouver; in Trail, British Columbia
  - Svetlana Nemolyaeva, Soviet Russian stage and film actress known for the comedy film Office Romance (1977 Sluzhebny roman), The Garage (1979, Garazh) and Quarantine (1983, Karantin); in Moscow
  - E. P. Sanders, American New Testament scholar; in Grand Prairie, Texas (d. 2022)
  - Florence Sally Horner, American kidnap victim held captive from 1948 to 1950; in Camden, New Jersey (killed in auto accident, 1952)
- Died:
  - Julia Nussenbaum, 25, American violinist who performed professionally under the name "Tania Lubova", was beaten to death with a hammer by her booking agent, Mischa Rosenbaum.
  - Anna Åbergsson, 66, Swedish founder of the allotment garden movement

== April 19, 1937 (Monday) ==
The FET Party flag

- Generalissimo Francisco Franco, leader of the Nationalists who would soon overthrow the Spanish Second Republic in the Spanish Civil War, issued the Unification Decree (Decreto de Unificación), merging the Falangists and the Carlists into a single political party called the Falange Española Tradicionalista y de las Juntas de Ofensiva Nacional Sindicalista (in English, the 'Traditionalist Spanish Phalanx of the Councils of the National Syndicalist Offensive'), commonly abbreviated to the "FET" or "FE JONS". After winning the War and becoming the leader of all of Spain, Franco issued a further decree outlawing all political parties except for the FET.
- Construction of San Francisco's Golden Gate Bridge was completed.
- The League of Nations Non-Intervention Committee agreed to establish patrols of Spain's coasts to determine the destination of vessels, but not to carry out search and seizure operations. Germany and Italy were to monitor Republican ships while Britain and France would monitor the Nationalists. This scheme proved to be ineffective since the Germans could use ships flying the Panamanian or Liberian flags and unload their cargo in Portugal with the complicity of authorities there.
- Anthony Eden told the British House of Commons that the government would investigate reports that poison gas had been shipped from Germany to Spain.
- Walter Young of Canada won the Boston Marathon.
- On Opening Day of the 1937 Major League Baseball season, Earle Brucker, at 35 one of the oldest rookies in the majors as he made his MLB debut at a game for the Philadelphia Athletics in a 4 to 3 win over the Washington Senators. Brucker took the field as the Athletics' catcher after U.S. President Franklin Roosevelt threw out the traditional first pitch, and then hit a double to win the game in the 10th inning.
- Born:
  - Joseph Estrada, President of the Philippines from 1998 to 2001; in Tondo, Manila
  - Elinor Donahue, American actress, best known today for playing the role of Betty Anderson on the 1950s U.S. sitcom Father Knows Best; in Tacoma, Washington.
  - Klaus Thunemann, German bassoon player; in Magdeburg (d. 2025)
- Died:
  - Billy Higgins, 48, African-American vaudeville entertainer and one of the most popular stage comedians of the 1920s, died of a long illness.
  - Edward Meeker, 63, American singer and performer, and one of the earliest recording artists, known for his appearances on the phonographic recordings of Thomas Edison performing songs such as "Chicken Reel", "Go Easy Mabel", "Harrigan" and "Take Me Out to the Ball Game".
  - Sir Martin Conway, 81, English explorer, mountaineer and cartographer
  - William Morton Wheeler, 72, American entomologist, myrmecologist and Harvard professor

== April 20, 1937 (Tuesday) ==
- In Berlin, Adolf Hitler reviewed 14,000 troops parading in honour of his 48th birthday. Albert Speer presented Hitler with renderings and a first model of the Volkshalle.
- On the occasion of Hitler's birthday, the first of 12 Adolf Hitler Schools (Adolf-Hitler-Schulen), operated by the SS Nazi paramilitary organization, was founded, initially for boys aged 14 to 18 years old to indoctrinate German youth about the Nazi Party ideologies.
- A fire and poisonous fumes in an elementary school in the Estonian city of Kilingi-Nõmme killed 17 students and injured 50 after film inside of a school movie projector caught fire and set fire to other open canisters of film.
- On Budget Day in the United Kingdom, Chancellor of the Exchequer Neville Chamberlain raised income and business taxes to achieve a small projected surplus of £282,000.
- The Jewish organization B'nai B'rith was banned in Nazi Germany on the basis of accusations that its individual members were spreading "communist propaganda".
- The drama film A Star Is Born, starring Janet Gaynor and Fredric March, premiered at Grauman's Chinese Theatre in Hollywood.
- The Key Food chain of supermarkets in the U.S. Atlantic coast was founded as a cooperative among several grocery stores in Brooklyn, New York City.
- Gerald "Gee" Walker of the Detroit Tigers hit for the cycle during a 4–3 win over the Cleveland Indians. He is the only player to ever hit for the cycle on Opening Day of the Major League Baseball season.
- Born:
  - George Takei, American actor and activist best known for the role of "Mr. Sulu" in Star Trek and for the film The Green Berets; as Hosato Takei in Los Angeles
  - Kamal Ahmed, Pakistani film score composer and winner of seven Nigar Awards; in Gurgaon, Punjab Province, British India (d. 1997)
  - Kamal Hossain, Bangladeshi government official who served as the nation's first Justice Minister (1972–1973) and then as Foreign Minister from 1973 to 1975; in Calcutta, Bengal Province, British India
  - Harvey Quaytman, American geometric abstract painter; in Far Rockaway, Queens, New York City (d.2002)
- Died: Gus Hill (stage name for Gustave Metz), 79, American vaudeville entrepreneur and former juggler who founded the Columbia Amusement Company in the 19th century and was president of the American Burlesque Association

== April 21, 1937 (Wednesday) ==
- A labor strike against six factories of the Remington Rand typewriter company by the Council of Office Equipment Workers labor union, affiliated with the American Federation of Labor, ended after 11 months when union members approved a settlement allowing them to return to their jobs.
- Born: David Lucas (pen name for David Helfman), American composer, songwriter and vocalist, known for composing several memorable commercial jingles; in Buffalo, New York
- Died: Saima Harmaja, 23, Finnish poet and writer, died of tuberculosis.

== April 22, 1937 (Thursday) ==
- Italian premier Benito Mussolini hosted Austrian Chancellor Kurt Schuschnigg in Venice. Mussolini explained that since the Rome-Berlin Axis had been formed, Schuschnigg could no longer count on Italian military support if Hitler made a move against Austria.
- Born:
  - Jack Nicholson, American film actor and winner of three Academy Awards for Best Actor, including for One Flew Over the Cuckoo's Nest; in Neptune City, New Jersey
  - Jack Nitzsche, American film score composer known for the original music in One Flew Over the Cuckoo's Nest; in Chicago (d. 2000)
  - Ruth Shoer Rappaport, American vaccine researcher (d. 2020)
  - Roger Slack, British-born Australian and New Zealand plant biologist known for his 1966 discovery, with Marshall Hatch, of C4 photosynthesis, also known as the "Hatch Slack Pathway"; in Ashton-under-Lyne, Lancashire (d. 2016)
- Died:
  - Simon W. Rosendale, 94, the first Jewish person to be elected to a statewide office in a U.S. state, as Attorney General for New York from 1892 to 1893
  - Arthur Carew (stage name for Hovsep Hovsepian), 52, Armenian-born American stage and film actor, committed suicide after having suffered a stroke the year before.
  - Iosif Adamovich, 40, Chairman of the Council of People's Commissars of the Byelorussian Soviet Socialist Republic from 1924 to 1927, committed suicide.

== April 23, 1937 (Friday) ==
- The Oshawa Strike ended in Canada when General Motors gave in to most of the strikers' demands, though the company still refused to recognize the United Automobile Workers union.
- The Madrid Defense Council (Junta de Defensa de Madrid), formed by the Second Spanish Republic to administer Madrid in November after the Spanish government had moved the capital to Valencia during the siege of Madrid by Francisco Franco's Nationalist Forces, was dissolved.
- In Hungary, Ferenc Szálasi was sentenced to three months in prison and prohibited from holding office for three years after being convicted for inciting people against the state as well as against Jews.
- Roosevelt Stadium opened in Jersey City, New Jersey.
- Born:
  - Vladimir Velichko, Soviet Russian government official who served as Deputy Premier of the Soviet Union from January to November 1991; in Mozhayskoye, Voronezh Oblast, Russian SFSR
  - Sibghat Kadri, British barrister and the first Pakistani and Muslim lawyer to be designated as Queen's Counsel; in the United Provinces, British India (d. 2021)
- Died: Yvonne Pitrois, 56, French author and activist for the welfare of deaf people in France

== April 24, 1937 (Saturday) ==
- Britain and France allowed Belgium to withdraw from its security obligation under the Locarno Treaties, excusing Belgium from having to render assistance along with the British and French in the event of German aggression toward Poland. The leaders of both the UK and France publicly declared that Belgium's security was paramount to the Western Allies and that they would defend Belgium's borders against aggression of any sort, whether directed solely at Belgium, or to obtain bases to wage war against "other states".
- British cryptographer and codebreaker Dillwyn "Dilly" Knox, who had been part of the Room 40 cryptanalysis group in the British Admiralty that had decoded the Zimmermann telegram in 1917, was able to break the Enigma code messages between Nazi Germany and Francisco Franco's Spanish Nationalists. News of the breakthrough was not shared with the Spanish Second Republic, which was fighting against the Nationalists.
- Born: La Thoại Tân (stage name for Pham Van Tan), Vietnamese-born American actor and singer; in Saigon, French Cochinchina (now Ho Chi Minh City, Socialist Republic of Vietnam) (d. 2008)
- Died: Lucy Beaumont, 63, English-born actress who performed on stage and in film in the UK and in the United States

== April 25, 1937 (Sunday) ==
- The Soviet Union announced the completion of all goals of the five-year plan nine months to a year ahead of schedule. The announcement came despite numerous articles in the state-controlled press stating that many branches of the plan were lagging behind.
- The Belarusian State Philharmonic, the national orchestra of the nation of Belarus, was founded in Minsk in the Byelorussian SSR.

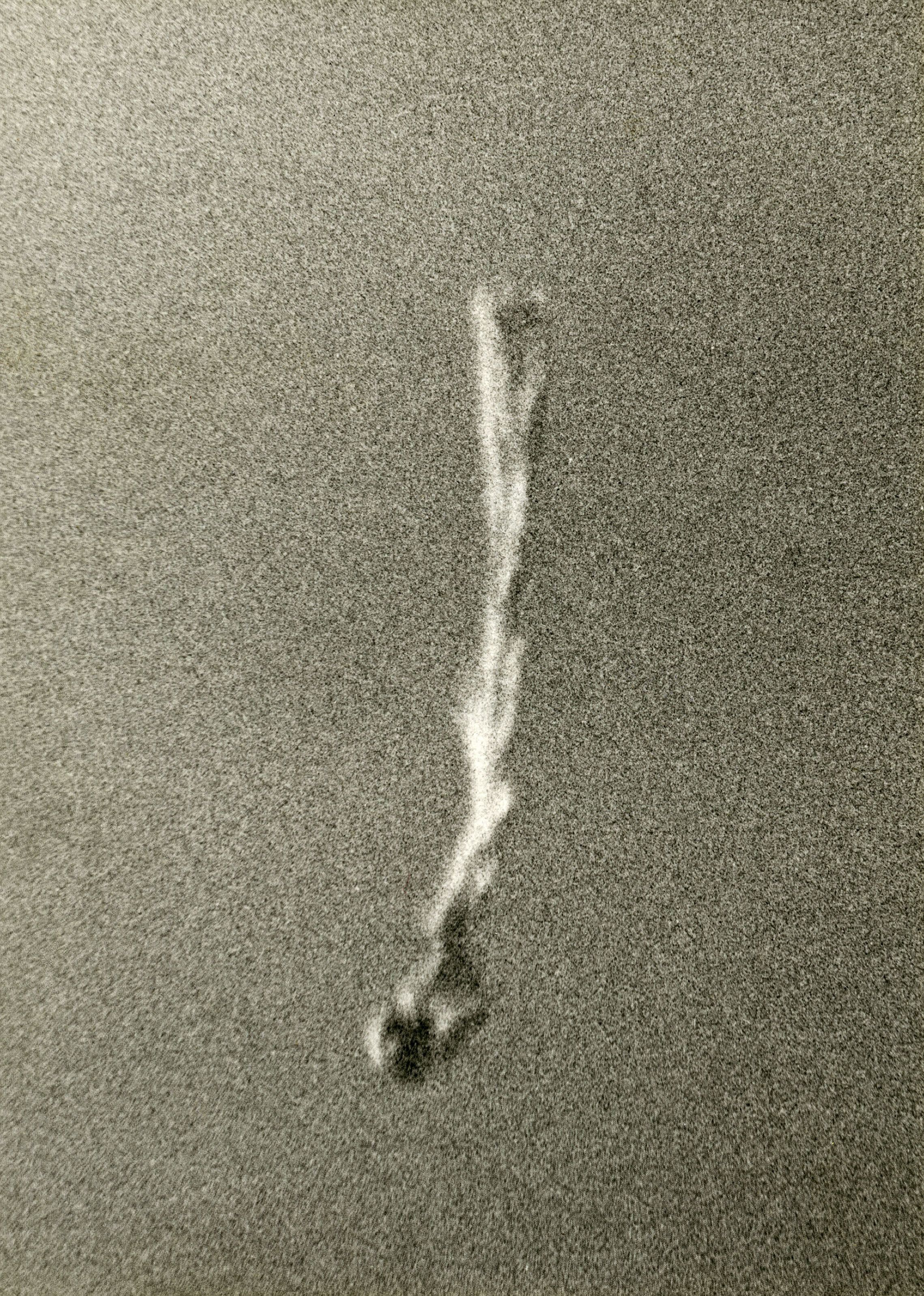
Sohn falls to his death

- Died:
  - Clem Sohn, 26, American airshow daredevil known for his stunt of gliding while wearing a wingsuit, and frequently billed as "The Batman", fell to his death while performing at an airshow in Vincennes, France, in front of a large crowd, after neither his parachute nor his emergency parachute opened.
  - Michał Drzymała, 79, Polish folk hero

== April 26, 1937 (Monday) ==
- Nazi Germany's Condor Legion carried out the destructive aerial bombing of the small (population 7,000) Spanish town of Guernica, killing at least 170 civilians and perhaps as many as 300. The first wave of bombing occurred at 4:30 in the afternoon as a single German Dornier Do 17 dropped 12 50-kg bombs, with the most destructive wave starting at 6:30 p.m. with three bomber squadrons of three Junkers Ju52 planes carrying out heavy bombing for 15 minutes, followed by other airplanes strafing roads leading out of town. Franco claimed three days later that Guernica had been destroyed on the ground by Communist demolition teams.
- The "Roman salute", a gesture in which the right arm is raised upward at an angle, fully extended, facing forward, with palm down and fingers touching, and revived in the 20th century as a symbol of support of Fascism, was formally approved in a decree by Francisco Franco as a form of salute among his Spanish nationalists. Franco issued his decree from his capital at Burgos. The salute, already used in Italy and Germany, was strictly used in Fascist rallies in insurgent-held Spain. The Spanish Nationalist military hierarchy continued to use the traditional military salutes. After World War II, use of the salute would be discontinued in September 1945.
- The U.S. Supreme Court decided the case of Herndon v. Lowry, ruling, 5 to 4, that the anti-insurrection law of the U.S. state of Georgia was unconstitutional and a violation of the First Amendment rights to freedom of speech and freedom of assembly, as well as of the 14th Amendment to the Constitution applying the rights to proceedings in all U.S. states.
- The long-running but now forgotten NBC Radio program Lorenzo Jones began a run of 18 seasons as a "comedy soap opera" about an inventor (portrayed by Karl Swenson) of strange gadgets, and with Bette Garde as his devoted wife Belle. The 15-minute show would be a late afternoon mainstay on NBC's daytime schedule until the end of the 1954–55 season.

== April 27, 1937 (Tuesday) ==
- The first social security payments were made in the United States under the Social Security Act of 1935.
- Wallis Simpson's divorce from her second husband, U.S.-born British shipbroker Ernest Simpson, became permanent when the mandatory six months elapsed after the divorce decree was issued. The former Mrs. Simpson was now free to marry again and made plans to marry the former King Edward VIII, who had become the Duke of Windsor.
- Born:
  - Sandy Dennis, American stage and film actress, winner of the Academy Award for Best Supporting Actress in 1966 for Who's Afraid of Virginia Woolf? and Tony Awards for Best Featured Actress and Best Actress; in Hastings, Nebraska (d. 1992)
  - Zhang Jie, Chinese novelist and short story author known for her works for teenagers; in Beijing (d. 2022)
  - Patricia Banks Edmiston, one of the first African-American stewardesses in the U.S., known for initiating a successful lawsuit against Capital Airlines in 1960 for racial discrimination, leading to the start of airlines employing more black people in the United States.
- Died:
  - Antonio Gramsci, 46, Italian Marxist politician and former leader of the Italian Communist Party, died after more than 10 years' imprisonment.
  - USMC Sergeant Major Daniel Daly, 63, United States Marine who was one of only 19 U.S. servicemen to be awarded the Medal of Honor twice, in 1900 and 1915

== April 28, 1937 (Wednesday) ==
- Spain's Nationalists, commanded by Francisco Franco, captured Durango and Guernica.
- Born: Saddam Hussein, President of Iraq from 1979 to 2003; in Al-Awja, Kingdom of Iraq (official birth date) (d. 2006)

== April 29, 1937 (Thursday) ==
- The Irish Brigade fighting in Spain on behalf of the Nationalists announced that it was disbanding.
- The Swedish language opera Prinsessan av Cypern) (The Princess of Cyprus), by Lars-Erik Larsson, with libretto by Finnish playwright Zacharias Topelius, premiered at Stockholm.
- Born:
  - Jill Paton Walsh, British author known for the novel Knowledge of Angels and for the Peter Wimsey–Harriet Vane mysteries that continued the work of Dorothy L. Sayers; in London (d. 2020)
  - Charles T. Tart, American psychologist and parapsychologist known for his work on altered states of consciousness, as one of the founders of the field of transpersonal psychology, and for his research in parapsychology; in Morrisville, Pennsylvania (d. 2025)
  - Hasil Adkins, American singer and songwriter known for his unusual playing and singing style, including playing guitar and drums at the same time; in Boone County, West Virginia (d. 2005)
- Died:
  - Wallace Carothers, 41, American organic chemist credited with the invention of nylon in 1935, committed suicide by taking potassium cyanide.
  - William Gillette, 83, American actor, playwright, and stage-manager best remembered for portraying Sherlock Holmes on stage and in a 1916 silent film
  - Carmelo Delgado Delgado, 24, Puerto Rican political leader and a member of the Abraham Lincoln Brigade, was executed by a firing squad after being captured by the Nationalists during the ongoing Battle of Madrid in the Spanish Civil War.
  - Bir Mitrodaya Singh Deo, 62, Maharaja of Sonepur (now part of the Odisha State of India) since 1902 He was succeeded as Maharaja by his son, Somabushan Singh Deo.

== April 30, 1937 (Friday) ==
- Women won the right to vote in the Philippines when a suffrage plebiscite passed with 90% approval. Under the legislation asking for a yes or no vote on the question "Are you in favor of granting suffrage to women?", the measure had to receive at least 300,000 votes in favor and more than those against. In all, 447,725 out of 492,032 men voted in favor of the measure.
- Voting for all 466 seats of the Japan House of Representatives was held after the parliament had been dissolved on March 31. The ruling Rikken Minseitō saw its share of seats drop from 205 to 179, only four more than the second place Rikken Seiyūkai, and the Prime Minister, General Senjūrō Hayashi, was unable to form a new government.
- The BBC television programme Sports Review, the first regular TV sports show anywhere in the world, premiered with radio sportscaster Howard Marshall presented film clips and live interviews with athletes and coaches. The monthly series would endure until Britain's entry into World War II on September 3, 1939.
- The Wilderness Society, an American non-profit organization to promote land conservation, was founded by eight U.S. conservationists.
- The first Azerbaijani language opera, Koroghlu, by Uzeyir Hajibeyov with libretto by Habib Ismayilov, was given its first performance, premiering at the Azerbaijan State Academic Opera and Ballet Theater in Baku.
- The Nationalist battleship España accidentally hit a naval mine laid by another Nationalist ship, and sank off Santander. All of the crew had been evacuated during the 75 minutes after the blast had occurred.
- Born:
  - Uttam Nepali (Uttam Prasad Karmacharya), Nepalese abstract painter; in Kathmandu (d. 2021)
  - Katheryn Edmonds Rajnak, American theoretical physical chemist known for making Hartree–Fock calculations of the energy levels of lanthanide elements; in Kalamazoo, Michigan (d. 2005)
