= List of awards and honours received by Angela Merkel =

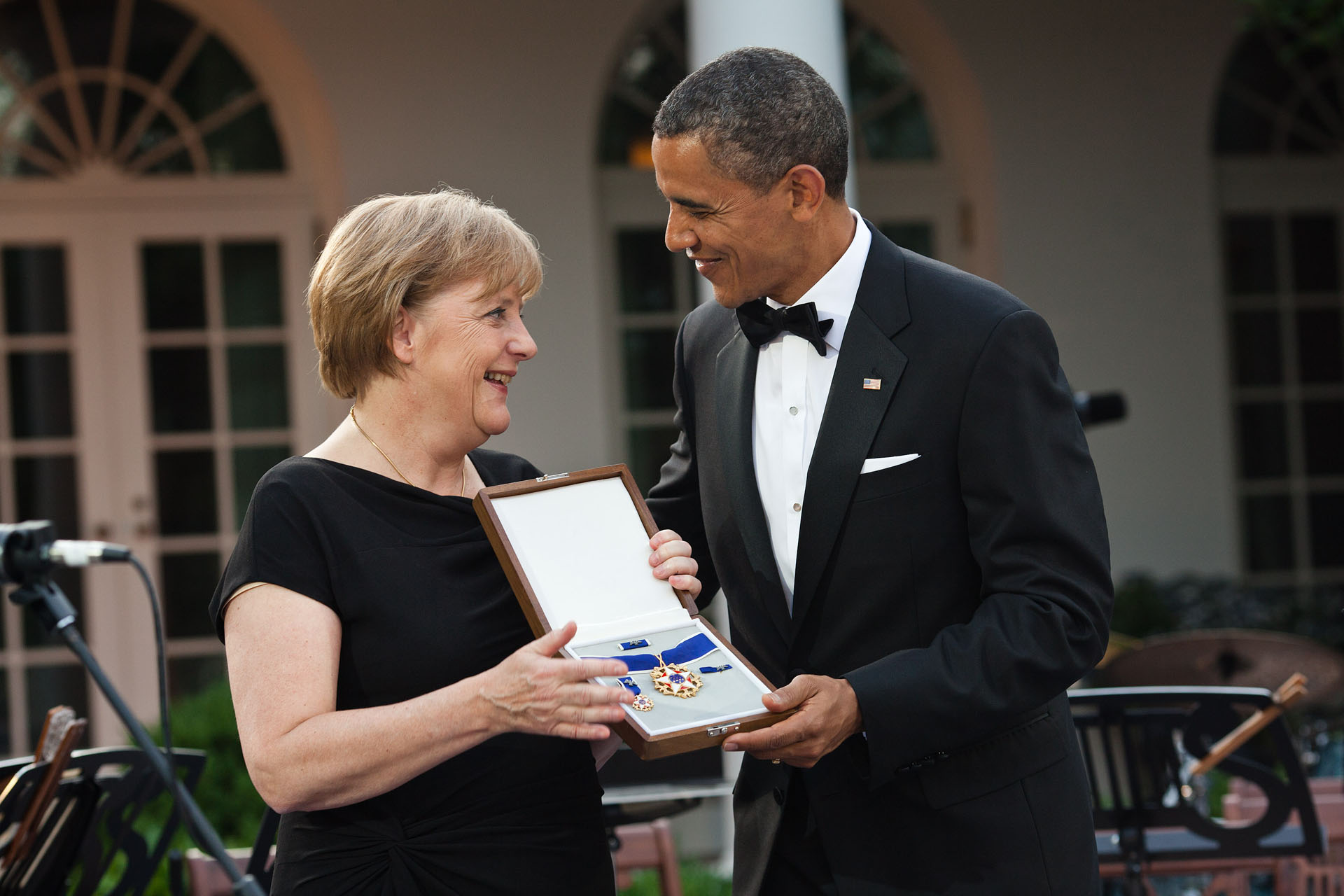
Merkel received the Presidential Medal of Freedom from U.S. president Barack Obama in 2011.

Angela Merkel has received awards and honours from national governments, universities, and other non-governmental organisations. Merkel was the chancellor of Germany from 2005 until 2021, a length of tenure only exceeded by that of Helmut Kohl, and was the first female German chancellor. During her chancellorship, she was widely considered the de facto leader of the European Union. Forbes named Merkel the world's second most powerful person in 2012 and 2015, and the world's most powerful woman fourteen times. Merkel has also commonly been described as the leader of the free world.

Awards and honours received by Merkel include a special issue of the Grand Cross First Class of the Order of Merit of the Federal Republic of Germany, the United States Presidential Medal of Freedom, and twenty-one doctorates honoris causa.

== State honours ==
=== German honours ===
On 17 April 2023, Merkel received the third-ever special issue of the Grand Cross 1st Class Order of Merit of the Federal Republic of Germany (German: Großkreuz in besonderer Ausführung) from President of Germany Frank-Walter Steinmeier. The special issue had previously been awarded to then-chancellors Konrad Adenauer and Helmut Kohl in 1954 and 1998, respectively, making Merkel the first woman to receive the honour. Steinmeier lauded Merkel's ambition, intelligence, passion, and commitment to her responsibilities as chancellor of Germany. Many observers praised Merkel's achievements, particularly in international diplomacy and shaping the politics of Germany. Some critics questioned the decision to bestow the award on Merkel due to her controversial legacy.

=== Foreign honours ===
Foreign honours received by Angela Merkel
| Year | Image | Awarding country | Foreign honour | Ref(s) |
|---|---|---|---|---|
| 2006 | | Italy | Knight Grand Cross of the Order of Merit of the Italian Republic | |
| 2007 | | Norway | Grand Cross of the Royal Norwegian Order of Merit | |
| 2008 | | Peru | Grand Cross of the Order of the Sun of Peru | |
| 2009 | | Portugal | Collar of the Order of Infante Henry | |
| 2010 | | United Arab Emirates | Collar of the Order of Zayed | |
| 2010 | | Bulgaria | Order For Bravery, 1st Class | |
| 2011 | | United States | Recipient of the Presidential Medal of Freedom | |
| 2014 | | Israel | Recipient of the President's Medal | |
| 2015 | | Austria | Grand Decoration of Honour in Gold with Sash of the Order of Honour for Services to the Republic of Austria | |
| 2015 | | Moldova | Member of the Order of the Republic | |
| 2017 | | Lithuania | Grand Cross of the Order of Vytautas the Great | |
| 2019 | | Slovakia | Grand Cross of the Order of the White Double Cross | |
| 2019 | | Latvia | Grand Officer of the Order of the Three Stars | |
| 2021 | | Estonia | Member 1st Class of the Order of the Cross of Terra Mariana | |
| 2021 | | Ukraine | Recipient of the Order of Liberty | |
| 2021 | | Slovenia | Recipient of the Order for Exceptional Merits | |
| 2021 | | Belgium | Grand Cordon of the Order of Leopold | |
| 2021 | | Luxembourg | Grand Cross of the Order of Merit of the Grand Duchy of Luxembourg | |
| 2021 | | Jordan | Grand Cordon of the Supreme Order of the Renaissance | |
| 2021 | | France | Grand Cross of the Order of the Legion of Honour | |
| 2021 | | Portugal | Collar of the Order of Infante Henry | |
| 2022 | | Netherlands | Knight Grand Cross of the Order of the Netherlands Lion | |

== Honorary degrees ==
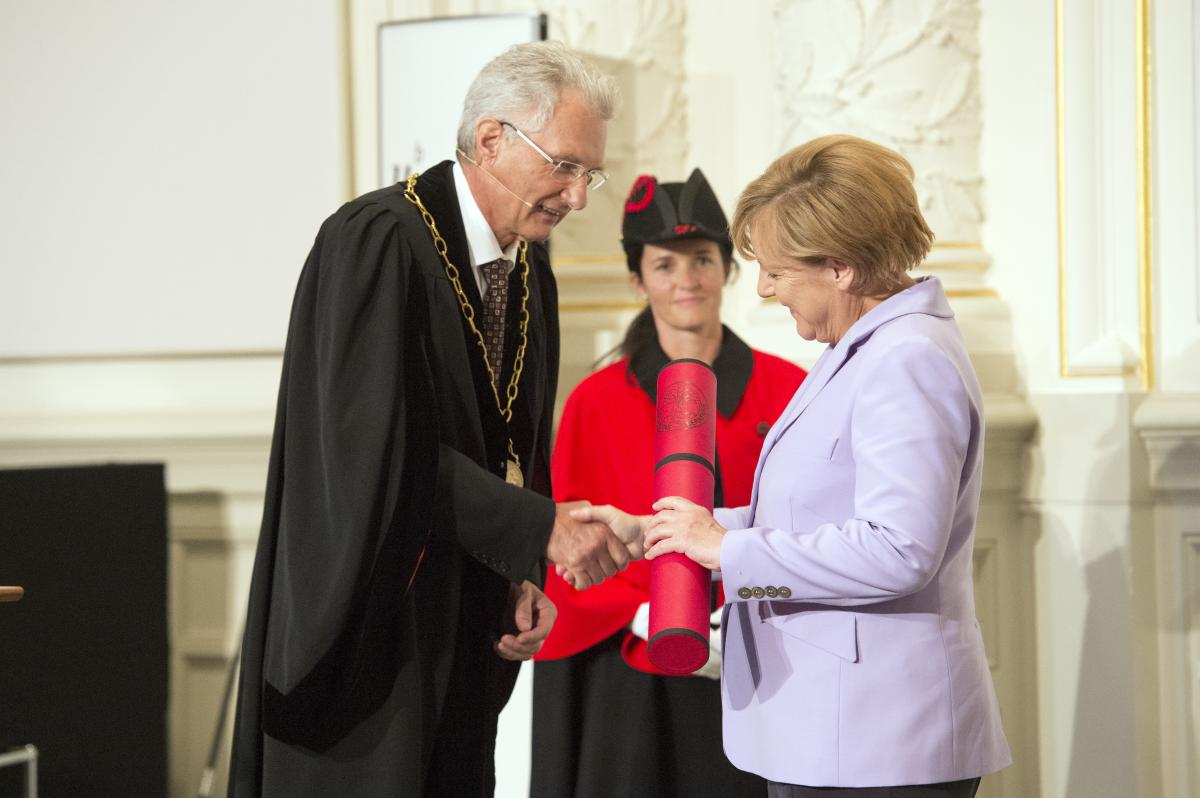
Merkel received an honorary doctorate from the University of Bern in 2015.

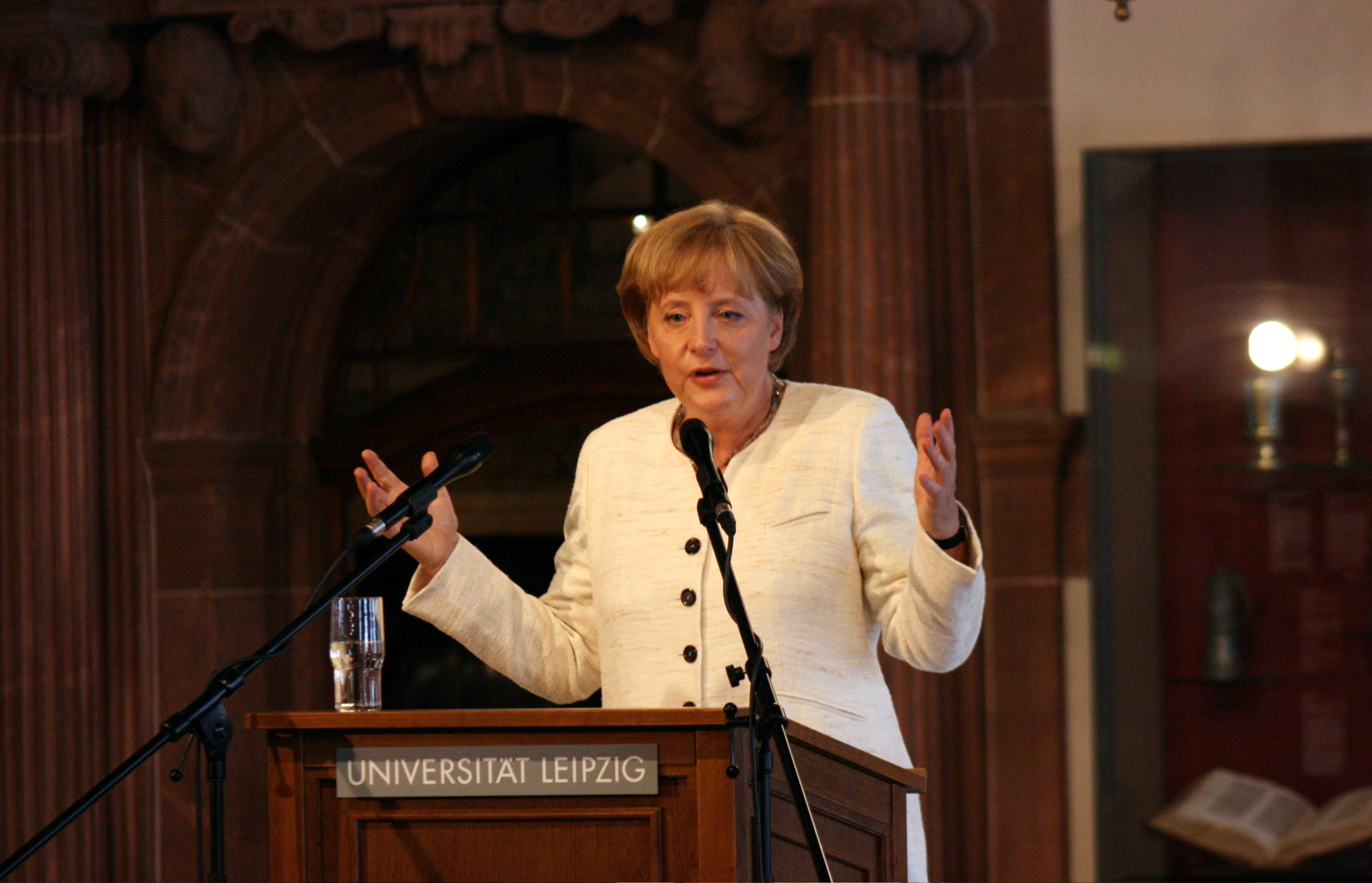
Merkel received an honorary doctorate from HHL Leipzig Graduate School of Management while visiting the university in 2008 to give a speech.

All honorary degrees received by Merkel have been doctorates honoris causa.

Honorary degrees received by Angela Merkel
| Year | Country | Institution | Ref(s) |
|---|---|---|---|
| 2007 | Israel | Hebrew University of Jerusalem | |
| 2008 | Germany | Leipzig University | |
| 2008 | Poland | Wrocław University of Science and Technology | |
| 2009 | United States | The New School | |
| 2009 | Switzerland | University of Bern | |
| 2010 | Bulgaria | University of Ruse | |
| 2010 | Romania | Babeș-Bolyai University | |
| 2010 | South Korea | Ewha Womans University | |
| 2011 | Israel | Tel Aviv University | |
| 2013 | Netherlands | Radboud University Nijmegen | |
| 2014 | Slovakia | Comenius University | |
| 2015 | Hungary | University of Szeged | |
| 2016 | China | Nanjing University | |
| 2017 | Belgium | Jointly by Ghent University and Katholieke Universiteit Leuven | |
| 2017 | Finland | University of Helsinki | |
| 2018 | Israel | University of Haifa | |
| 2019 | United States | Harvard University | |
| 2019 | Germany | HHL Leipzig Graduate School of Management | |
| 2021 | United States | Johns Hopkins University (JHU) | |
| 2021 | Israel | Technion – Israel Institute of Technology | |
| 2023 | France | Sciences Po | |
| 2026 | United Kingdom | University of Cambridge | |

== Awards and other significant honours ==
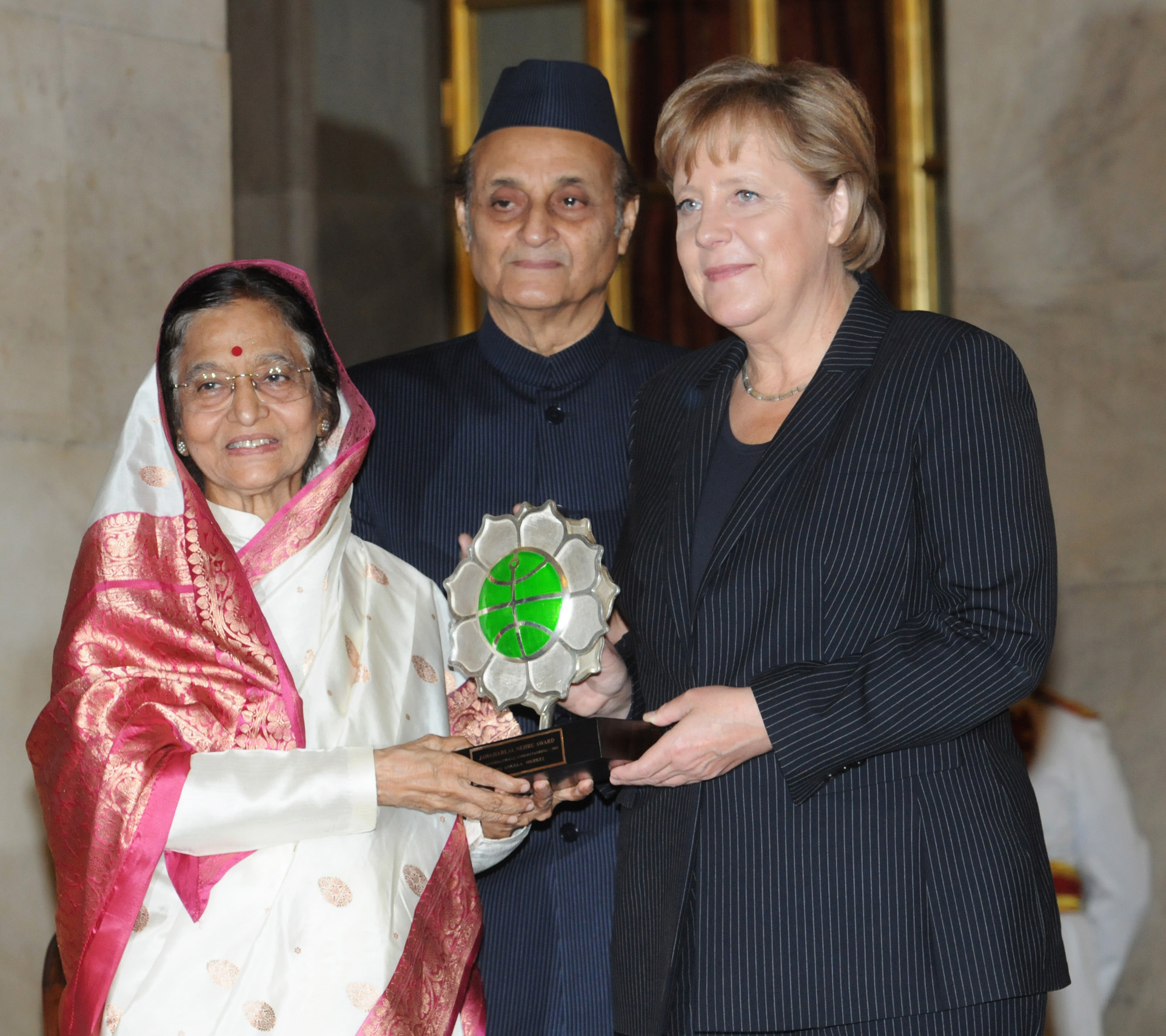
Merkel was awarded the 2009 Jawaharlal Nehru Award for International Understanding in 2011.

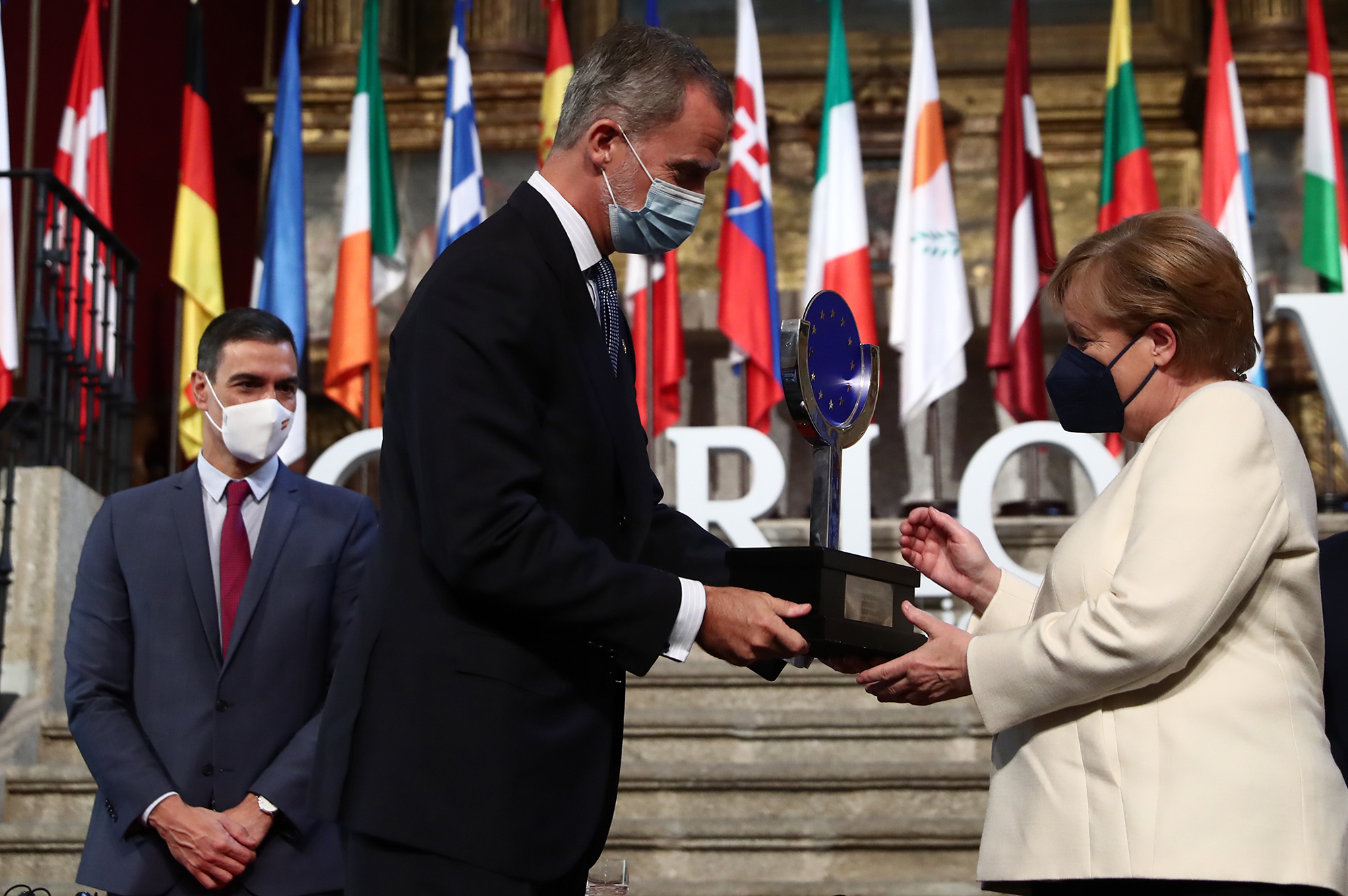
In 2021, King Felipe VI awarded Merkel the Charles V European Award.

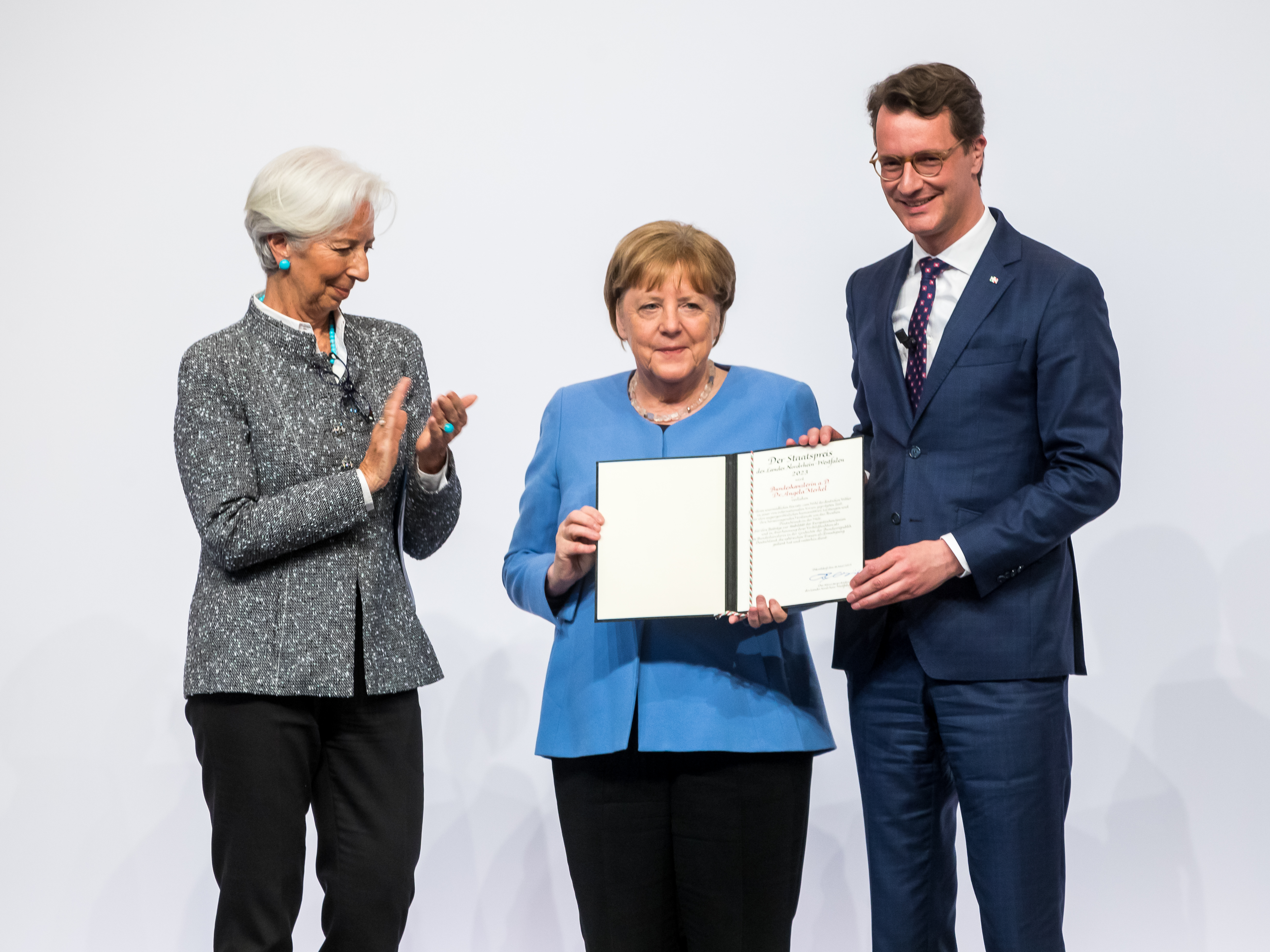
The North Rhine-Westphalian State Prize was awarded to Merkel in 2023.

Awards and other significant honours received by Angela Merkel
| Year | Award | Ref(s) |
|---|---|---|
| 2006 | Vision for Europe Award | |
| 2008 | B'nai B'rith Europe Award of Merit | |
| 2008 | Charlemagne Prize | |
| 2010 | European Prize from the European Society Coudenhove-Kalergi | |
| 2010 | King Charles II Medal from the Royal Society | |
| 2010 | Global Leadership Award from the American-German Institute at JHU | |
| 2010 | Leo Baeck Medal | |
| 2011 | Light unto the nations Prize from the American Jewish Committee | |
| 2011 | 2009 Jawaharlal Nehru Award for International Understanding | |
| 2011 | Prize for Understanding and Tolerance from the Jewish Museum Berlin | |
| 2012 | Heinz Galinski Award | |
| 2013 | Lord Jakobovits Prize for European Jewry from the Conference of European Rabbis | |
| 2013 | Indira Gandhi Peace Prize | |
| 2015 | Time Person of the Year | |
| 2015 | Abraham-Geiger Prize | |
| 2016 | Four Freedoms Award | |
| 2017 | Elie Wiesel Award | |
| 2017 | International Gender Equality Prize from the Finnish Government | |
| 2019 | Fulbright Prize for International Understanding | |
| 2020 | Henry A. Kissinger Prize | |
| 2020 | Buber-Rosenzweig Medal | |
| 2021 | Charles V European Award | |
| 2022 | Félix Houphouët-Boigny Peace Prize | |
| 2022 | Nansen Refugee Award | |
| 2023 | North Rhine-Westphalian State Prize | |
| 2023 | Bavarian Order of Merit | |
| 2026 | Distinguished Member of the European Order of Merit | |
| 2026 | Leipzig International Mendelssohn Prize | |
