= 22nd Division (Spain) =

Divisions of the Spanish Republican Army

- 22.ª División
- Active: April 3, 1937–March 1939
- Country: Spain
- Allegiance: (Second Spanish Republic) Republican faction
- Branch: Spanish Republican Army
- Type: Infantry
- Size: Division
- Engagements: Spanish Civil War: Levante Offensive

Commanders
- Notable commanders: Víctor Álvarez González; Eusebio Sanz Asensio

The 22nd Division was one of the divisions of the Spanish Republican Army that were organized during the Spanish Civil War on the basis of the Mixed Brigades. It came to operate on the Andalusian and Levante fronts.

== History ==
The unit was created on April 3, 1937, within the Army of the South. The 22nd Division was born from the militarization of the old Granada sector. (Note: The other unit that emerged from the militarization of the old Granada Sector was the 21st Division, commanded by Martín Calvo Calvo.) The unit, made up of 51st, 78th and 93rd mixed brigades, was initially under the command of Antonio Gómez de Salazar and, later, Urbano Orad de la Torre. As of June 1937, the division was integrated into the IX Army Corps, on the Andalusian front.

In the spring of 1938, the division was sent as reinforcement to the Levante front, being added to the XXI Army Corps. The division was later assigned to the XXIII Army Corps, where it remained until the end of the war.

== Controls ==
Commanders

- Antonio Gómez de Salazar;
- Urbano Orad de la Torre (from April 1937);
- Francisco Menoyo Baños (from June 1937);
- Víctor Álvarez González (from January 1938);
- Eusebio Sanz Asensio (from November 1938);

Commissar

- José Cuadras Botines, of the PCE;

Chiefs of Staff

- Ángel Saavedra Gil;
- Francisco Lucio Bañuelos (from January 1938);
- José Bueno Quejo (from February 1939);

== Order of battle ==
Date	Attached Army Corps	Integrated Mixed Brigades	Battle front
June 1937	IX Army Corps	51st, 78th and 93rd	Andalusia
April 1938	XXI Army Corps	79th, 211th and 220th	Levante
May 12, 1938	XXI Army Corps	6th, 129th and 220th	Levante
December 1938	XXIII Army Corps	51st and 55th	Andalusia

== Bibliography ==
- Alpert, Michael (2013). The Republican Army in the Spanish Civil War, 1936-1939. Cambridge University Press.
- Álvarez, Santiago (1989). Los comisarios políticos en el Ejército Popular de la República (in Spanish). Ediciós do Castro.
- Álvarez Rey, Leandro; Lemus López, Encarnación (1998). Historia de Andalucía Contemporánea (in Spanish). Universidad de Huelva.
- Engel, Carlos (1999). Historia de las Brigadas Mixtas del Ejército Popular de la República (in Spanish). Madrid: Almena. ISBN 84-922644-7-0.
- Martínez Bande, José Manuel (1981). La batalla de Pozoblanco y el cierre de la bolsa de Mérida (in Spanish). Madrid: Editorial San Martín.
- Zaragoza, Cristóbal (1983). Ejército Popular y Militares de la República, 1936-1939 (in Spanish). Barcelona: Ed. Planeta.
