= Fruitdale =

Fruitdale can refer to several U.S. communities:

- Fruitdale, Alabama, in Washington County, Alabama
- Fruitdale, California
  - Fruitdale (VTA), a light rail station in San Jose, California
- Fruitdale, Indiana
- Fruitdale, Ohio
- Fruitdale, South Dakota
- Fruitdale, Dallas, Texas
- Harbeck-Fruitdale, Oregon
