= March 1937 =

Month of 1937

<<	March 1937					>>
Su	Mo	Tu	We	Th	Fr	Sa
	1	2	3	4	5	6
7	8	9	10	11	12	13
14	15	16	17	18	19	20
21	22	23	24	25	26	27
28	29	30	31

March 18, 1937: Natural gas explosion at Texas school kills 295 people (Universal Newsreel)

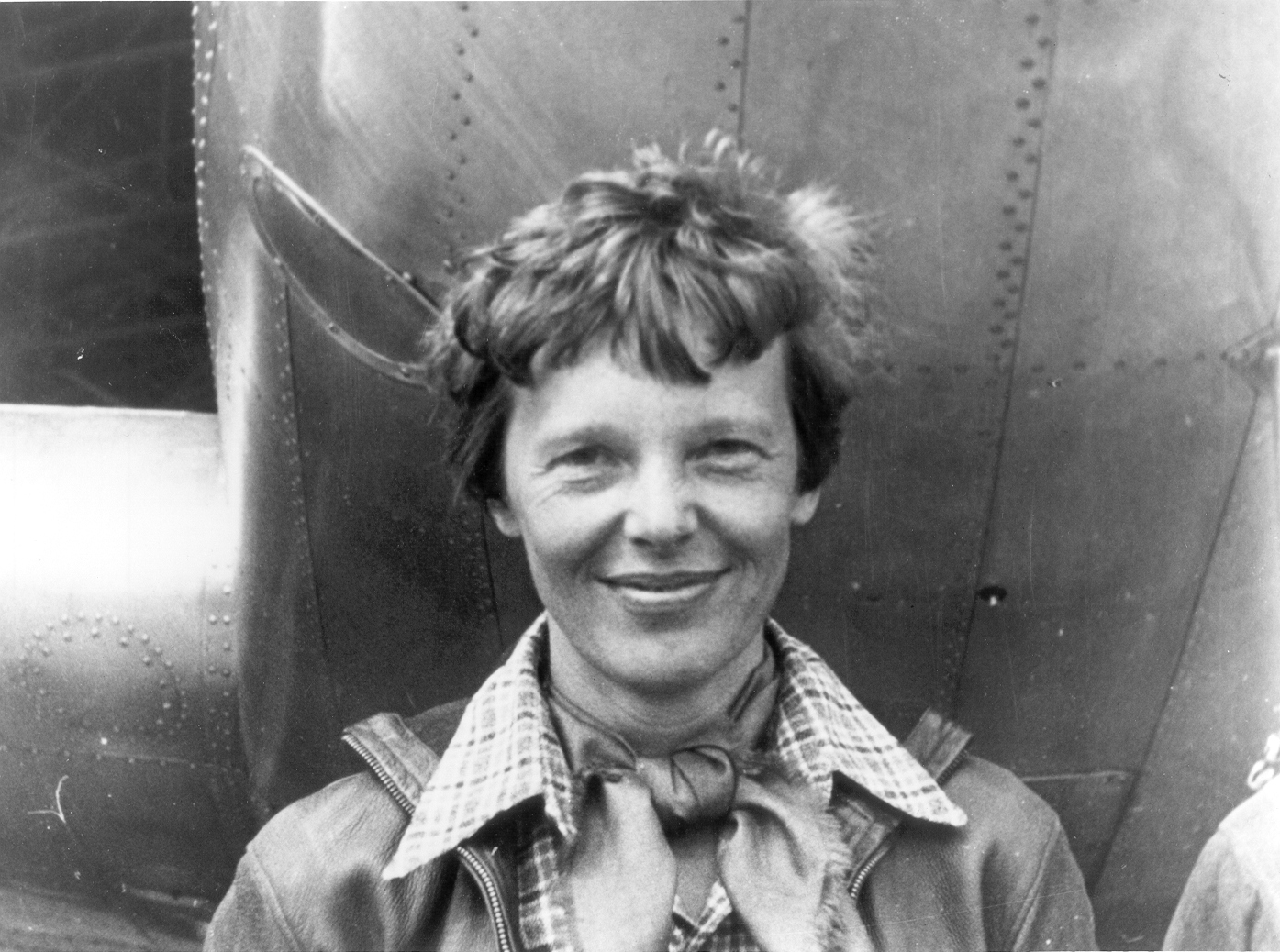
March 20, 1937: Amelia Earhart escapes injury in Honolulu plane crash

The following events occurred in March 1937:

== March 1, 1937 (Monday) ==
- Former Prime Minister Kyösti Kallio was sworn into office as the fourth President of Finland after being selected by a vote of Finland's 300-member Electoral College on February 15.
- The Camp of National Unity political party (OZN or Obóz Zjednoczenia Narodowego) was founded in Poland.
- The government of Manchukuo, the Japanese-occupied puppet state formed from the three northeastern provinces of the Republic of China, passed a law on royal succession making Puyi's brother Pujie the next in line for the throne. Puyi, the last Emperor of China, had been married for 14 years but had no children.
- The French steamer Marie-Thérèse le Borgne hit a naval mine in the same area where the British ship Llandovery Castle was damaged a week previously. The ship was able to make port at Palamós.
- Born:
  - Eugen Doga, Moldovan composer; in Mocra, Moldavian ASSR, Ukrainian SSR, Soviet Union (d. 2025)
  - Jimmy Little, Australian aboriginal musician; at the Cummeragunja Reserve in New South Wales (d. 2012)
  - Anis Ud Dowla, Bangladeshi businessman and chairman of the conglomerate ACI Limited; in Faridpur, Bengal Province, British India
- Died:
  - Major General John Antill, 71, Australian Army officer whose command decisions during the Battle of the Nek in the Gallipoli campaign of World War I helped contribute to the casualty rate of 372 killed or wounded of 600 members of the 3rd Light Horse Brigade.
  - DeWitt Jennings, 65, American stage and film actor

== March 2, 1937 (Tuesday) ==
- The British House of Commons voted, 243 to 134, to endorse the government's rearmament program. Italy replied by ordering every male in the country between 18 and 55 to be fit for "integral militarization".
- In the U.S., the Steel Workers Organizing Committee (SWOC), led by Philip Murray, signed a collective bargaining agreement with the United States Steel Company, recognizing the SWOC as the sole bargaining agent for U.S. Steel employees.
- Mexican President Lázaro Cárdenas announced that the government would take over control of the country's oil resources.
- A re-editing of the Frank Capra-directed drama-fantasy film Lost Horizon starring Ronald Colman premiered in San Francisco after a trial run of a longer version on February 18 in Miami.
- Cecilia Colledge of the United Kingdom won the ladies' competition of the World Figure Skating Championships in London.
- Born: Abdelaziz Bouteflika, President of Algeria from 1999 to 2019; in Oujda, French Morocco (d. 2021)

== March 3, 1937 (Wednesday) ==
- The Holmes Foundry Riot occurred in Sarnia, Ontario, in Canada. Workers engaging in a sitdown strike were attacked by non-striking employees who wanted to go back to work. Fifty people were injured, including 9 who were hospitalized.
- Lieutenant-Colonel Germán Busch, Chief of the General Staff of Bolivia, announced his resignation to President David Toro as a test of Busch's support within the military. Toro refused the resignation and would be forced out of office on July 13, with Busch becoming the new president.
- New York City's Mayor Fiorello H. La Guardia made a speech to a Jewish women's group proposing that the 1939 World's Fair include a "Hall of Horrors" with a figure of "that brown-shirted fanatic who is now menacing the peace of the world." The next day, the German newspaper Der Angriff dedicated its entire front page to attacking Mayor La Guardia, calling him a "scoundrel" and an "impudent Jew" who governed New York with "the terror of the revolvers and clubs of his gangster friends." The German government directed its Ambassador to Washington Hans Luther to make a formal protest against La Guardia's remarks.
- Born:
  - Bobby Driscoll, child actor; in Cedar Rapids, Iowa (d. 1968)
  - Tsukasa Hosaka, Japanese footballer with 19 caps for the Japan national team; in Kofu, Yamanashi Prefecture (d. 2018)

== March 4, 1937 (Thursday) ==
- The 9th Academy Awards were held in Los Angeles. The Great Ziegfeld won for Best Picture; Frank Capra won Best Director for Mr. Deeds Goes to Town; Paul Muni and Luise Rainer for Best Actor and Best Actress; Walter Brennan and Gale Sondergaard for Best Supporting Actor and Actress, respectively.
- The Greek freighter Loukia sank after hitting a mine floating in the sea off the coast of Cape San Sebastian in Spain, killing all but one of the 24 men aboard.
- Born:
  - Graham Dowling, New Zealand cricketer; in Christchurch
  - Leslie H. Gelb, American political scientist and newspaper columnist; in New Rochelle, New York (d. 2019)
  - Yuri Senkevich, Soviet and Russian doctor, adventurer and scientist; in Choibalsan (Mongolia) (d. 2003)
  - Barney Wilen, jazz saxophonist; in Nice, France (d. 1996)
- Died:
  - Alice Cooper, 62, American sculptor best known for her statue Sacajawea and Jean-Baptiste
  - John A. Gilruth FRSE, 66, controversial Australian Administrator of the Northern Territory and former veterinarian, died of a respiratory infection.

== March 5, 1937 (Friday) ==
- The Battle of Cape Machichaco was fought off the coast of Spain, when the Spanish Nationalist cruiser Canarias intercepted the transport ship Galdames and its 173 passengers, engaging the escort of four Basque Auxiliary Navy trawlers in battle. The Basque ships Bizcaya, Gipuzkoa, Donostia and Nabarra had set sail with Galdames from Bayonne in France toward Bilbao. The trawler Nabarra was sunk, with the loss of 29 men, while 20 others were treated and then imprisoned. Four passengers on Galdames were killed and one, Catalan legislator Manuel Carrasco Formiguera, was imprisoned and would be executed in 1938.
- The Communist Party of Spain demanded that POUM be eliminated.
- The Hungarian government revealed a plot by the National Socialist Party and arrested its leader Ferenc Szálasi.
- The U.S. Department of State officially apologized to the German government for Fiorello La Guardia's remarks.
- Born: Olusegun Obasanjo, President of Nigeria from 1976 to 1979 and 1999 to 2007; in Ibogun-Olaogun, Colonial Nigeria
- Died:
  - Sir Frederic Lang, 85, Speaker of the New Zealand House of Representatives from 1913 to 1922
  - Jujiro Wada, 65, Japanese adventurer and entrepreneur in Alaska, co-creator of the Iditarod Trail
  - Charles "Blondy" Wallace, 57, early American pro football player for the Canton Bulldogs in 1905 and 1906, college football All-American, later convicted of tax evasion.
  - Hong Taechawanit (Zheng Ziyong), 69, Chinese and Thai philanthropist

== March 6, 1937 (Saturday) ==
- The Battle of Pozoblanco began in Spain.
- A two-question referendum was held in Australia. Neither proposal to alter the Australian Constitution was carried.
- The Belgian student association "Academicus Sancti Michaëlis Ordo" was founded.
- Born:
  - Valentina Tereshkova, Soviet cosmonaut and the first woman in space, on Vostok 6 on June 16, 1963; in Bolshoye Maslennikovo, Yaroslavl Oblast, USSR
  - Cyriaco Dias, Indian actor in tiatr stage productions and Konkani cinema; in Raia, Goa, Portuguese India

== March 7, 1937 (Sunday) ==
- Voting was held in Chile for all 146 seats of the Cámara de Diputados and for 20 of the 45 seats of the Chilean Senate. The Liberal Party and the Conservative Party each won 35 seats in the Cámara, with the Radical Party close with 29 and the new Socialist Party having 19. At the end of the election of 20 seats, the 45-seat balance in the Senate was 12 Liberals, 12 Conservatives, 11 for Radicals, and the other 10 divided among four parties.
- The Percy Grainger composition Lincolnshire Posy was first performed, premiering in the U.S. in Milwaukee.
- Born: Aby Har Even, Romanian-born Israeli scientist and Director General of the Israeli Space Agency from 1995 to 2004; in Rociu (killed in a fire, 2021)

== March 8, 1937 (Monday) ==
- The Battle of Guadalajara began in Spain, as 35,000 men of Italy's Corpo Truppe Volontarie, with 81 tanks, attacked troops of the Spanish Republic. Because of heavy rains, the Italian troops were limited by heavy mud and under bombardment by the Spanish Air Force.
- The steamship Mar Cantabrico, carrying war material from the United States to the Spanish Republic, was intercepted in the Bay of Biscay by the Nationalists who shot 26 members of the crew.
- The title of Duke of Windsor was created for the former King Edward VIII. The title would exist until Edward's death, without issue in 1972.
- Born: Juvénal Habyarimana, the second President of Rwanda from 1973 to 1994; in Gisenyi Ruanda-Urundi (assassinated 1994)
- Died: Howie Morenz, 34, Canadian ice hockey player, died of a coronary embolism caused by complications from an injury during an NHL game on January 28.

== March 9, 1937 (Tuesday) ==
- Germany's Interior Minister Heinrich Himmler ordered the arrest of "professional criminals" who had committed two or more crimes but were now free after serving their sentences. Over the next few days some 2,000 people were arrested without charges and sent to concentration camps.
- U.S. President Franklin D. Roosevelt gave a fireside chat on his judicial reform bill, asking listeners the rhetorical question, "Can it be said that full justice is achieved when a court is forced by the sheer necessity of its business to decline, without even an explanation, to hear 87% of the cases presented by private litigants?", prompting a response and denial by U.S. Chief Justice Charles Evans Hughes, but also leading to a perceived shift by the Court in favor of Roosevelt's New Deal policies.
- The Soviet Union began its first experimental television broadcasts, using broadcast and receiving equipment manufactured by the Radio Corporation of America (RCA) for the 343-line television system that was the standard in the U.S. at the time. The U.S. would move to the 525 lines system for analog television by 1941.
- Born:
  - Harry Neale, Canadian ice hockey coach and commentator; in Sarnia, Ontario
  - Bernard Landry, Canadian politician and premier of the province of Quebec from 2001 to 2003; in Saint-Jacques, Quebec (d.2018)
  - Paul Hunt, British author and disability rights activist; in Angmering, Sussex (d.1979)
  - Azio Corghi, Italian composer; in Cirié (d.2022)
- Died: Paul Elmer More, 72, American journalist, essayist and Christian apologist

== March 10, 1937 (Wednesday) ==
- Pope Pius XI issued the encyclical Mit brennender Sorge (German for "With deep anxiety"), with a publication date of March 14, condemning breaches of the Reichskonkordat by the Nazi regime in Germany. Unlike most papal encyclicals, the publication was written in German rather than Latin.
- German and Italian POWs who fought for the Nationalists in the Spanish Civil War were interviewed in Valencia by a correspondent of the British newspaper The Times. The captured fighters confirmed they were regular soldiers of their country's army and not civilian volunteers.
- Italy's Premier Benito Mussolini sailed for Libya to conduct an inspection tour and review the Italian fleet.
- Jersey Airport opened in the Channel Islands.
- Born: Joe Viterelli, American character actor known for portraying organized crime henchmen, supporting actor in the films Analyze This and its sequel Analyze That; in New York City (d.2004)
- Died:
  - Yevgeny Zamyatin, 53, Russian dissident in the Soviet Union and author, known for the 1921 science fiction novel We, died of a heart attack while in exile in Paris.
  - Major General Samuel Hof, 66, Chief of Ordnance of the United States Army from 1930 to 1934

== March 11, 1937 (Thursday) ==
- The French language opera L'Aiglon ("The Eaglet), composed by Arthur Honegger and Jacques Ibert was performed for the first time, premiering in Monte Carlo.
- A coal mine explosion in the U.S. near Logan, West Virginia, killed 18 underground miners. The blast at the MacBeth mine was the worst mine disaster in more than a decade in the state of West Virginia

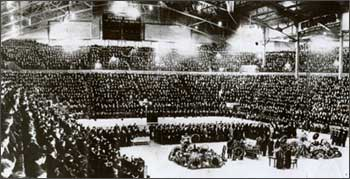
Funeral of Howie Morenz

- The funeral of Howie Morenz was held in the Montreal Forum, marking the first and only time that the sports arena was used for that purpose.

The Saudi flag

- Saudi Arabia's King Ibn Saud issued a decree officially adopting the flag currently used by the Middle Eastern nation, a green banner with the Islamic creed, "There is no god but God; Muhammad is the Messenger of God.".
- Died:
  - Joseph S. Cullinan, 76, American oil industrialist and founder of Texaco
  - Paul Scheinpflug, 61, German composer and conductor for the Dresden Philharmonic Orchestra, died of pneumonia.

== March 12, 1937 (Friday) ==
- Aimo Cajander became Prime Minister of Finland for the third time as he formed a new government of ministers and was appointed by President Kyosti Kallio. Cajander included five Socialists, who had been absent from a cabinet for 10 years, and an equal number of Agrarian Party members, as well as others from his own Liberal Party.
- Ernst Udet, a German World War One fighter ace, became the first person to land an airplane on top of a flying dirigible. Udet touched down on top the airship LZ 129 Hindenburg, which would be destroyed less than two months later, on May 6, in a fiery explosion.
- While in Libya, a colony of Italy at the time, Italian Prime Minister Benito Mussolini opened a new highway for the North African area, built at a cost of more than five million U.S. dollars.
- Dr. Francis E. Townsend, the U.S. activist who had campaigned for a government pension for elderly people, was sentenced by federal judge Peyton Gordon to 30 days in jail and a $100 fine for contempt of the U.S. House of Representatives.
- The U.S. Ambassador to Germany, William Dodd, protested to German Foreign Minister Konstantin von Neurath about recent attacks on the United States in the German press. Von Neurath said he regretted the violent tone of the articles but did not give a formal reply.
- The critically acclaimed Indian Tamil language film Chintamani, directed by Y. V. Rao and starring M. K. Thyagaraja Bhagavathar, premiered.
- Died: Charles-Marie Widor, 93, French organist, composer and teacher

== March 13, 1937 (Saturday) ==
- The National Labor Relations Board issued a ruling in the Remington Rand strike, finding that Remington Rand had committed acts of deceit, economic warfare and union breaking. The company was ordered to reinstate all strikers with back pay and recognize the union, but owner James Rand, Jr. refused and the strike continued.
- With labor leader Philip Murray negotiating on its behalf, the Steel Workers Organizing Committee (SWOC) signed a collective bargaining agreement with U.S. Steel. The agreement provided for a standard pay scale, an 8-hour work day, and time and a half for overtime.
- American motorcyclist Joe Petrali set a motorcycling land speed record of 136.183 miles per hour (219.165 km/h), which would remain unbroken until September 13, 1948.
- One of the few tank-vs.-tank engagements of the Spanish Civil War was fought near Trijueque when some Republican T-26s destroyed five Italian-made CV 3/35 tankettes and severely damaged two more.
- Born:
  - Virginia Holsinger, American nutrition researcher; in Washington, D.C. (d. 2009)
  - Ian Clough, British mountaineer; in Baildon, Yorkshire (killed in climbing accident, 1970)
- Died:
  - Elihu Thomson, 83, English engineer and inventor
  - Nikolai Glebov-Avilov, 49, Soviet Communist revolutionary and the former People's Commissar of Posts and Telegraphs, was executed during the Great Purge by Joseph Stalin after being found guilty of "being in a revolutionary terrorist organization," and being shot to death in prison.

== March 14, 1937 (Sunday) ==
- Beginning at midnight the naval powers of France, Great Britain, Italy and Germany began patrolling the seas off the coast of Spain to keep foreign arms and volunteers out of the Spanish Civil War.
- Born:
  - Galina Samsova, Soviet Russian ballet dancer who later emigrated to Canada; in Stalingrad (now Volgograd) (d. 2021)
  - Baltasar Porcel, Spanish Catalan literary critic and authority on Catalan literature; in Andratx, Majorca (d. 2009)

== March 15, 1937 (Monday) ==
- The first "blood bank" in the United States was opened, as Dr. Bernard Fantus and Dr. Elizabeth Schermer of the Cook County Hospital, in Chicago, Illinois, implemented an idea that had originated in the Soviet Union in 1930 for short-term preservation of blood from donors for the benefit of recipients.
- An anti-Nazi rally in Madison Square Garden in New York City attracted 20,000 people. Banners hanging from the rafters called for a boycott of Nazi goods. Hugh S. Johnson, the former director of the National Recovery Administration, was a featured speaker at the event, declaring that "Hitler and his immediate staff of Nazipathics have become a sort of monster, threatening the peace of the world."
- The 102-foot (31 m) tall Arco dei Fileni, known in Libya as "El Gaus", was dedicated on the border of Tripolitania and Cyrenaica. Italian architect Florestano Di Fausto had designed the arch at the request of General Italo Balbo, the Governor-General of Italian Libya, in advance of a visit by Italy's Premier Benito Mussolini.
- Died:
  - H. P. Lovecraft, 46, American weird fiction author, died of intestinal cancer.
  - Scipione Riva-Rocci, 73, Italian pediatrician and internal medicine specialist known for his invention (in 1896) of the blood pressure cuff for ease of operation of the mercury sphygmomanometer.
  - Catherine Edith Macauley Martin, 89, Australian novelist who wrote An Australian Girl in 1890 under the pen name Mrs. Alick MacLeod

== March 16, 1937 (Tuesday) ==
- In the Soviet Union, the OBKhSS, Department Against Misappropriation of Socialist Property, was established as a unit within the Soviet interior ministry, the NKVD, to monitor financial crimes.
- The Corpo Truppe Volontarie from Italy was routed during the Battle of Guadalajara in the Spanish Civil War.
- The Civil List of George VI was presented in the House of Commons. Prince Edward, Duke of Windsor, was absent from the list, ending the speculation over whether he would receive a government pension. Whatever income Edward was to receive would be a matter purely within the family.
- Born: David Del Tredici, American composer and 1980 Pulitzer Prize for Music winner; in Cloverdale, California (d.2023)
- Died: Sir Austen Chamberlain, 73, former British Foreign Secretary (1924-1929) and 1925 Nobel Peace Prize laureate

== March 17, 1937 (Wednesday) ==
- In the Soviet Union, Vasily Sharangovich was appointed as the First Secretary of the Communist Party of Byelorussia, becoming the de facto leader of what is now Belarus. He took part in a purge of Byelorussian SSR officials, including the head of government, Nikolay Goloded, and the chairman of the presidium (nominally the head of Belarus), Alexander Chervyakov, as a part of a stated campaign "destroing to the end the remnants of the Japanese-German and Polish spies and saboteurs, the remnants of the Trotskyist-Bukharin gang." Sharangovich's reign of terror lasted only the end of July before he was himself arrested on charges of sabotage and espionage. He would be executed on March 15, 1938.
- Hans von Tschammer und Osten, Nazi Germany's Reichssportführer, called upon all German athletes to join the Hitler Youth.
- The former French ambassador to Italy, Charles de Chambrun, was shot in the thigh by a woman who blamed him for breaking up her friendship with Mussolini.
- Born:
  - Frank Calabrese, Sr., American mobster; in Chicago (d. 2012)
  - Terry Dicks, British Conservative Member of Parliament born with cerebral palsy, serving Hayes and Harlington from 1983 to 1997; in Bristol (d. 2020)

== March 18, 1937 (Thursday) ==
- At 3:10 p.m., before the New London Consolidated School was scheduled to be dismissed, a natural gas explosion killed at least 295 people in New London, Texas, although initial reports set the death toll at more than 400. The explosion remains the worst school disaster in American history. The disaster was later traced to the moment when a teacher, unaware of the accumulation of natural gas beneath the first floor of the school, turned on an electric sanding machine during a manual arts class.

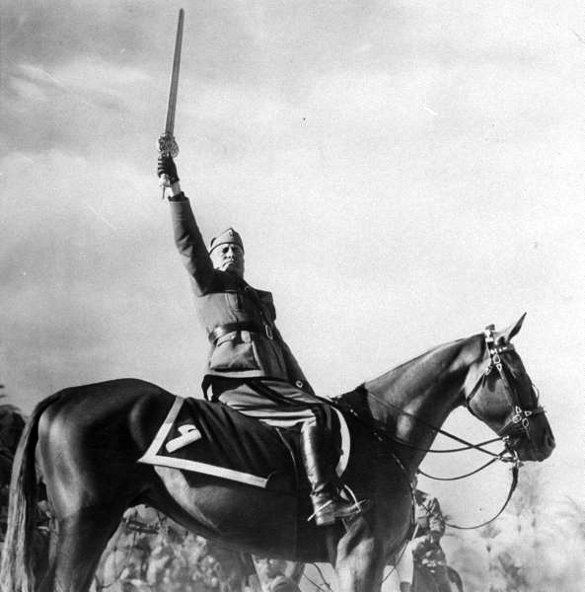
Mussolini, protector of the Muslim faith

- Arabs in Tripoli, Libya, presented Benito Mussolini with the "Sword of Islam" to symbolize his leadership and present him as a protector of the Muslim faith. A famous propaganda photo depicted Mussolini on horseback raising this sword above his head.
- The army of the Second Spanish Republic took Brihuega and defeated Francisco Franco's Nationalists in a violent clash within the battle of Guadalajara.
- Soviet Russian novelist Ivan Kataev was arrested as part of the Great Purge initiated by Joseph Stalin on charges of "participating in an anti-Soviet counter-revolutionary terrorist organization." He was executed five months later.
- The Phoenix Islands, a group of eight atolls in the South Pacific Ocean, were transferred by the British Secretary of State for the Colonies to the jurisdiction of the Gilbert and Ellice Islands (now the separate republics of Kiribati and Tuvalu). Of the Phoenix group, only Canton Island is inhabited, and is more than 1,000 miles (1,600 km) away from Kiribati.
- Born: Elizabeth Rauscher, American physicist and parapsychologist; in Berkeley, California (d. 2019)
- Died: Lucy Fitch Perkins, 71, American children's book writer and illustrator known for the "Twins series" of popular children's books between 1911 and 1934

== March 19, 1937 (Friday) ==
- Pope Pius XI promulgated the anti-Communist encyclical Divini Redemptoris, five days after publishing the anti-Fascist encyclical Mit brennender Sorge. The Pope chastised the "non-Catholic press" for what he called "a conspiracy of silence" (rem ex condicto silentio premunt) for not giving news coverage to persecutions carried out by extremists.
- Royal Mail, a thoroughbred ridden by Evan Williams and a longshot with 100/6 odds, won the Grand National steeplechase horse race, held at Aintree and witnessed by 300,000 people. Royal Mail delivered at the course in less than 10 minutes, finishing in 9 minutes, 39 seconds.
- Cesare Del Cancia of the Ganna team won the world's premier one-day cycling race, the Milan–San Remo, covering the 281.5-kilometre (174.9 mi) distance in 7 hours and 30 minutes.
- Born: Clarence "Frogman" Henry, African-American R&B singer; in New Orleans (d. 2024)

== March 20, 1937 (Saturday) ==
- Lou Gehrig signed a new contract with the New York Yankees for $36,000 plus a $750 signing bonus, making him the highest-paid player in baseball.

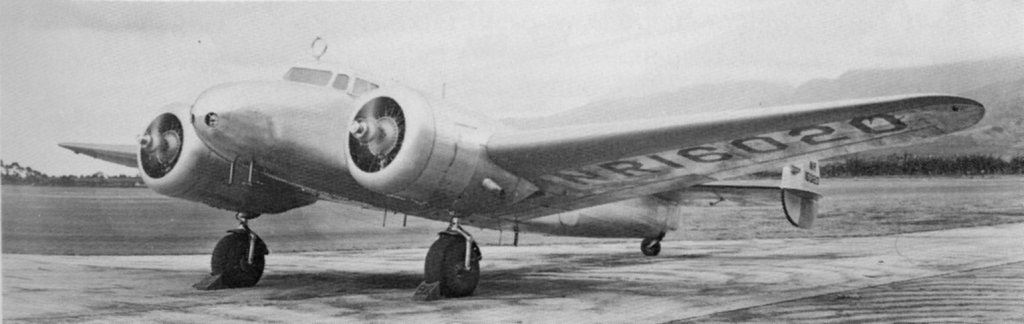
The Electra, hours before takeoff

- Amelia Earhart's plane crashed and burst into flames as she and navigators Harry Manning and Fred Noonan were attempting to take off from Luke Field in Honolulu. One of the wings on the Lockheed Electra clipped the ground and the landing gear collapsed. The three escaped injury, but Manning chose not to accompany Earhart on another flight.
- Born:
  - Jerry Reed, American country musician and songwriter, inductee to the Musicians Hall of Fame; in Atlanta (d. 2008)
  - Lois Lowry, American children's book author; in Honolulu, Hawaii Territory
- Died:
  - Harry Vardon, 66, English golfer and six-time winner of the British Open between 1896 and 1911, as well as the 1900 U.S. Open, died of lung disease. The PGA's Vardon Trophy is named in his honor.
  - André Raynaud, 32, French bicyclist and 1936 UCI World Champion, was killed while competing at a motor-paced bicycle race at the Sportpaleis in Antwerp when he was struck by another competitor's pacer.

== March 21, 1937 (Sunday) ==
- The Ponce massacre occurred in Ponce, Puerto Rico, when police opened fire with machine guns on an initially peaceful civilian march, killing 21 people and wounding more than 200.
- Mit brennender Sorge, the encyclical issued by Pope Pius XI, was read out from the pulpits of German Catholic churches. Copies of the encyclical had to be secretly smuggled into the country.
- Died:
  - Sayed Jaffar, 25, Pakistani field hockey player for the British India team, drowned in the Ravi River near Lahore.
  - Levan Gogoberidze, Soviet Georgian Communist who served in 1930 as the First Secretary of the Georgian Communist Party, was executed by gunshot three months after he had been arrested as part of the Great Purge by Soviet Communist Party First Secretary Joseph Stalin.

== March 22, 1937 (Monday) ==
- The only acknowledgement of the papal encyclical Mit brennender Sorge in the German press appeared in the Völkischer Beobachter, where an editorial said that "even an agreement with the Holy See has not sacrosanct, untouchable and eternal value."
- Mary Russell, Duchess of Bedford, 71, an ornithologist as well as a private pilot, disappeared after departing from Woburn Abbey in England for a short flight in a de Havilland DH.60 Moth airplane. Wreckage of the Moth airplane was found in the North Sea off the coast of Great Yarmouth. The body of Russell was never found.
- Born:
  - Armin Hary, German Olympic sprinter who won a gold medal for the 100 meter dash in the 1960 Olympics; in Quierschied
  - Angelo Badalamenti, American composer of film scores; in Brooklyn, New York (d. 2022)
  - Foo Foo Lammar (stage name for Francis Joseph Pearson), British nightclub owner and female impersonator; in Ancoats, Lancashire (d. 2003)
- Died: Alfred Dyke Acland, 78, British Army officer

== March 23, 1937 (Tuesday) ==
- The Spanish Republic won the Battle of Guadalajara over the Nationalists, temporarily preventing Generalissimo Francisco Franco and allies from Italy from encircling Madrid.
- Born: Craig Breedlove, American race car driver known for his record-setting land speed records, as the first person in history to reach 500 miles per hour (800 km/h) (10/13/1964) and the first to reach 600 miles per hour (970 km/h) (11/15/1965); in Los Angeles (d. 2023)
- Died:
  - Mikas Petrauskas, 63, Soviet Lithuanian opera composer known for the first Lithuanian language opera, Birutė
  - William Harrison, 61, English first-class cricketer

== March 24, 1937 (Wednesday) ==
- A strike of 60,000 auto workers against Chrysler ended after 17 days when a tentative settlement was reached.
- The Social Credit backbenchers' revolt took place in the Canadian province of Alberta. By a vote of 27 to 25, a motion was carried in the legislature to adjourn the debate on his government's budget, despite the protest of Premier William Aberhart.
- A fiery bus crash near Salem, Illinois, in the U.S. killed 20 members of a touring group of roller derby skaters who were traveling from St. Louis to Cincinnati as part of the Transcontinental Roller Derby Association circuit operated by Leo Seltzer. Only five people, including the bus driver, survived when the bus suffered a tire blowout while on U.S. Highway 50, sideswiped a bridge rail and overturned, trapping the victims on the bridge.
- Oxford won the 89th Boat Race, ending Cambridge's streak of 13 consecutive wins.
- The romantic drama film Seventh Heaven, starring Simone Simon and James Stewart, premiered at Grauman's Chinese Theatre in Hollywood.
- Born: Elaine McKenna, Australian singer and actor, 1961 Logie Award winner for Best Singer; in Melbourne (d. 1992)

== March 25, 1937 (Thursday) ==
- Italy and Yugoslavia signed a five-year non-aggression and neutrality pact. Yugoslavia recognized Ethiopia as Italian territory while Italy made trade concessions and granted language and school rights for its Yugoslav minority.
- TWA Flight 15A, operated by what was then called Trans Continental & Western Air, crashed in the U.S. at Clifton, Pennsylvania, killing all 15 people aboard. The Douglas DC-2 airliner was approaching Pittsburgh after departing Camden, New Jersey when icing on the wings froze the controls.
- The Lewiston–Auburn shoe strike began in Maine.
- Born: Vadim G. Vizing, Soviet Ukrainian mathematician known for Vizing's theorem; in Kiev (d. 2017)
- Died: Georges Valmier, 51, French abstract and impressionist painter

== March 26, 1937 (Friday) ==
- William H. Hastie became the first African-American federal magistrate in U.S. history when he was confirmed as judge of the Federal District Court for the U.S. Virgin Islands.
- Born: Wayne Embry, American basketball player and executive, known for being the first African-American general manager and team president in NBA history, for the Toronto Raptors; in Springfield, Ohio
- Died: Henry Pegram, 74, British sculptor

== March 27, 1937 (Saturday) ==
- A decree by Hermann Göring was published declaring that anyone who owned land suitable for agriculture was obligated to cultivate it. Landowners who did not comply would be forced to lease part or all of their property to an approved expert.
- De Kuip (officially the Feijenoord Stadion), the iconic stadium of the Netherlands' soccer football team Feyenoord, held its first game, an exhibition (or friendly) in Rotterdam with a match against Beerschot A.C. Feyenoord won the match, 5 to 2 in front of 37,825 spectators.
- The Stanford University Indians defeated the Washington State Cougars, 41 to 40, to win the Pacific Coast Conference men's basketball tournament and to finish with one of the best records in the nation, 25 wins against only 2 losses for the best percentage (.926). Although the NCAA had no nationwide tournament until the 1939 season, it would recognize a 1943 retroactive poll by the Helms Athletic Foundation declaring Stanford as the season's champion.
- Born: Johnny Copeland, American blues musician; in Haynesville, Louisiana (d. 1997)
- Died: Henry Kitchener, 2nd Earl Kitchener, 90, British soldier and peer

== March 28, 1937 (Sunday) ==
- Pope Pius XI published the encyclical Nos es muy conocida about the religious situation in Mexico.

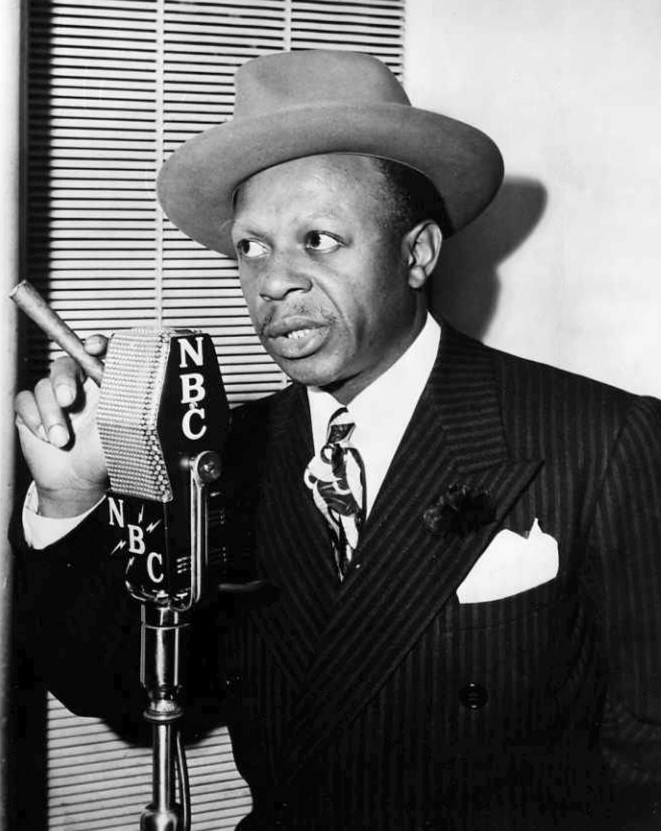
Anderson voicing Rochester on the radio

- Eddie Anderson, African-American actor and comedian, made his first appearance on The Jack Benny Program on the NBC radio network as "Rochester Van Jones" and was so popular as a character that he became the first black American to be a regular actor in an American broadcast series.
- Born:
  - David Lockton, American lawyer, inventor and entrepreneur known for the Ontario Motor Speedway and WinView, Inc.; in Indianapolis
  - Arne Fjørtoft, Norwegian news anchorman and journalist, later a politician and leader of the Venstre Party, 1986 to 1990; in Sauda
- Died:
  - Frances Brundage, 82, American illustrator
  - Julius Manger, 69, founder and owner of the Manger Hotels chain of luxury hotels and upscale motor inns and motels, the largest in the U.S. at the time
  - Veronica Gedeon, 20, American model, was murdered along with her mother and a resident of their apartment building in the upscale Beekman Place neighborhood on Manhattan's East Side. Robert George Irwin, a sculptor who had once been a boarder at the apartment, was later convicted of the triple homicide.

== March 29, 1937 (Monday) ==
- The U.S. Supreme Court decided West Coast Hotel v. Parrish, Wright v. Vinton Branch and Virginia Railway v. Federation on the same day, reversing the Court's pattern of striking down New Deal legislation. Conservative Justice Owen Roberts made the jurisprudential shift known as "the switch in time that saved nine" in the Parrish case, being the factor in a 5 to 4 ruling upholding the minimum wage law in the U.S. state of Washington, and preventing further attempts to add justices to the Court.
- In the Soviet Union, NKVD Secretary Pavel Bulanov, who had organized the January trial of 17 Communist Party officials arrested on orders of Joseph Stalin, found himself arrested on Stalin's orders, along with former NKVD Director Genrikh Yagoda. The two would be among 18 people executed in 1938 after being convicted in the case of the Anti-Soviet "Bloc of Rightists and Trotskyites".
- French cyclist Georges Paillard broke the world record for fastest speed of pedaling a bicycle at 85.379 miles per hour (137.404 km/h) on the Autodrome de Linas-Montlhéry near Paris while behind a motorcycle pacer.
- Born: Billy Carter, American businessman, politician and younger brother of Jimmy Carter; in Plains, Georgia (d. 1988)
- Died:
  - Karol Szymanowski, 54, Polish composer and pianist, died of tuberculosis.
  - Kim You-jeong, 29, Korean novelist, died of pulmonary tuberculosis.

== March 30, 1937 (Tuesday) ==
- A Nationalist offensive at Almadén was repulsed in Spain.
- German Führer Adolf Hitler was reported to have reconciled his feud with Erich Ludendorff going back to the failed 1923 Beer Hall Putsch.
- Born: Warren Beatty, American actor and filmmaker, winner of the 1982 Academy Award for Best Director for Reds (film) and the 1979 Golden Globe Award for Best Actor in a Motion Picture Musical or Comedy; as Henry Warren Beaty in Richmond, Virginia
- Died: Auguste Wilbrandt-Baudius, 93, German-born Austrian stage actress

== March 31, 1937 (Wednesday) ==
- The bombing of Durango by Spanish Nationalist forces resulted in the city's destruction and the deaths of almost 250 residents.
- The Spanish Civil War campaigns known as the War in the North and Biscay Campaign began.
- At the behest of Japanese army and navy leaders, an Imperial ordinance was passed which dissolved the Diet and set a new general election for its 466 seats to be held on April 30.
- Died: Ahmed Izzet Pasha, 72, former Grand Vizier of the Ottoman Empire and its last Foreign Minister prior to the creation of the Turkish Republic
