= Eusebio Sanz Asensio =

Spanish military personnel

Eusebio Sanz Asensio was a Spanish anarchist and military commander.

== Biography ==
Already a member of the National Confederation of Labor (CNT), at the outbreak of the Spanish Civil War, he joined the confederal militias and became a member of the Rosal Column, commanding an anarchist battalion that acted in the Sierra de Gredos and in Somosierra. Here he participated in the defense of Madrid.

In January 1937, following the militarization of the confederal militias, he was appointed commander of the 70th Mixed Brigade, which took part in the Battle of Jarama. Some time later he was sent to the north, where he commanded the 168th Mixed Brigade; at the head of this unit he took part in the Battle of Santander, trying to stop the nationalist advance. Later, after the fall of the northern front, he returned south to the central zone. He came to command the 25th and 22nd divisions, intervening in various military operations during the Levante Offensive.

== Bibliography ==
- Alpert, Michael (2013). The Republican Army in the Spanish Civil War, 1936-1939. Cambridge University Press.
- Engel, Carlos (1999). Historia de las Brigadas Mixtas del Ejército Popular de la República (in Spanish). Madrid, Almena. 84-922644-7-0.
- Llarch, Joan (1976). Cipriano Mera. Un anarquista en la guerra de España (in Spanish). Euros.
- Peirats, José; Ealham, Chris (2005). The CNT in the Spanish Revolution. Vol. II. ChristieBooks.com.
- Zaragoza, Cristóbal (1983). Ejército Popular y Militares de la República, 1936-1939 (in Spanish). Barcelona: Ed. Planeta.
