= Katheryn Edmonds Rajnak =

American theoretical physical chemist

Katheryn Rajnak
- Born: Katheryn Marie Edmonds; April 30, 1937; Kalamazoo, Michigan
- Died: February 3, 2005 (aged 67); Kalamazoo, Michigan
- Education: Kalamazoo College; University of California, Berkeley
- Known for: Hartree–Fock calculations of the energy levels of lanthanide elements.
- Awards: Phi Beta Kappa (1959); Clark Benedict Williams Prize in Mathematics (1959); National Science Foundation Scholarship (1959); Honorary Woodrow Wilson Fellowship (1959)
- Scientific career
- Fields: Physical chemistry
- Workplaces: Kalamazoo College; Western Michigan University; Lawrence Berkeley Laboratory; Argonne National Laboratory; Lawrence Livermore Laboratory; Paris-Sud University (Orsay)

Katheryn (Kathie) Marie Edmonds Rajnak (April 30, 1937 – February 3, 2005) was an American theoretical physical chemist who lived and worked in the United States. She was known for her work applying variations of the Hartree–Fock approach to calculating the energy levels of the lanthanide elements and their compounds. Applications of those results include the design of lasers for inertial-confinement fusion and for uranium isotope separation. She was the first woman to teach physics at Kalamazoo College, starting in 1967.

== Early life and education ==
Rajnak was born on April 30, 1937, in Kalamazoo, Michigan. She attended Kalamazoo College, earning her bachelor's degree in chemistry in 1959, magna cum laude. She defended her doctoral thesis, Configuration interaction in the rare earths and its effect on the stark levels of PrCl₃ and GdCl₃ · 6H₂O, at the University of California, Berkeley in November 1962, under the guidance of Brian R. Judd (known now for the Judd–Ofelt theory).

== Later life and career ==
Rajnak had a postdoctoral research appointment at Lawrence Berkeley Laboratory, from 1962 to 1965. She was a lecturer in Chemistry at Western Michigan University in 1966. She relocated to Kalamazoo College when her husband gained a position there, where she was Assistant Professor of Physics in 1967–70. Other appointments at WMU and Kalamazoo followed, and she held a permanent part-time position at Kalamazoo from 1975. Her final position was Adjunct Associate Professor of Physics at Kalamazoo, 1985–96.

Rajnak retired in 1997.

== Research ==
Her research collaborations included sustained work with the Argonne National Laboratory (actinide chemistry group), from 1966; visiting researcher at Paris-Sud University (Orsay), spring quarters, 1987–91; Lawrence Livermore Laboratory (Theoretical Atomic and Molecular Physics and Laser Fusion groups), from 1973; and Lawrence Berkeley Laboratory (Materials and Molecular Research Division), 1982–83. The Livermore work involved calculations related to laser isotope separation of Uranium and possible new solid-state lasers.

== Personal life ==
She was married to Stan Rajnak, a professor of mathematics at Kalamazoo College. The two had a hobby of collecting seaweed, and also collected oriental and local art.

Rajnak died on February 3, 2005.
