= Mozhayskoye, Voronezh Oblast =

Mozhayskoye Можайское
- Selo
- Location within Voronezh Oblast Location within Russia
- Coordinates: 51°19′N 39°39′E
- Country: Russia
- Region: Voronezh Oblast
- District: Kashirsky District
- Time zone: UTC+3:00

Mozhayskoye (Russian: Можайское) is a rural locality (a selo) and the administrative center of Mozhayskoye Rural Settlement, Kashirsky District, Voronezh Oblast, Russia. The population was 722 as of 2010. There are 6 streets.

== Geography ==
Mozhayskoye is located 13 km south of Kashirskoye (the district's administrative centre) by road. Zaprudskoye is the nearest rural locality.
