= Pennsylvania chocolate workers' strike, 1937 =

1937 strike at Hershey Chocolate Company

Hershey, Pennsylvania witnessed a six-day sit-down strike of workers at the Hershey Chocolate Corporation in 1937. The strike ended in violence, as dairy workers and loyal Hershey employees stormed the factory to force out strikers. Eventually, the company signed an agreement with the American Federation of Labor through the Bakery and Confectionery International Union, becoming one of the first American candy companies to unionize.

== Background ==
=== Corporate changes ===
Founded in 1894 by Milton Hershey, the Hershey Chocolate Corporation became one of the richest candy companies in existence. In its first three decades, Hershey, Pennsylvania was an idyllic company town that thrived no matter what was going on in the rest of the country. Hershey was seen as a benevolent employer, providing benefits, retirement plans, and amenities to workers before they were commonplace. All of that changed with the Great Depression and the explosion of the labor movement.

Before the Depression, Hershey employees were accustomed to a sixty-hour work week, so when they were restricted to forty hour weeks, many had difficulty getting by on their post-Depression paychecks. Initially, Milton Hershey could legitimately keep tight controls on hours and wages because it was required under the National Recovery Administration (NRA), but the NRA was later found unconstitutional and could no longer be enforced.

From 1930 to 1936, Milton Hershey had spent more than $10 million on building up Hershey, Pennsylvania, but he reduced hours of his employees and stopped paying annual bonuses. In those six years, the Hershey Chocolate Corporation made more than $37 million in after-tax profits.

=== Company town ===
Many Hershey employees also resented the paternalistic attitude of the company. Milton Hershey built a town for his workers, attempting to cater to their material and spiritual needs, including entertainment and education. But not everyone was comfortable living in a place where everything was controlled by one man and his executives. This degree of control and entanglement with their personal lives meant that many hiring and firing decisions were made based on individual relationships and favoritism. This disturbed some employees, and made them receptive to Congress of Industrial Organizations (CIO) organizers in 1937.

=== "Chocolate Bar-B" ===
In the last weeks of 1936, a newsletter called "The Chocolate Bar-B" began to circulate around the chocolate factory. The leaflet aired grievances over low wages, erratic work schedules and recent orders to speed up production. It insisted that chocolate workers did perform physically demanding labor, with deafening levels of noise and temperatures over 100 degrees. It scolded the "big bosses", Murrie and Hershey, for their "high salaries and slave-driving methods". The newsletter was signed by the Communist Party of Hershey, Pennsylvania and strongly advised the workers to unionize.

== Events of the strike ==
=== CIO Comes to Town ===
In January 1937, members of the CIO held a secret meeting at a firehouse in Palmyra, Pennsylvania. After the meeting, several hundred Hershey employees formed a local of the United Chocolate Workers Union and within weeks several hundred factory workers had joined. When the union first approached Hershey to negotiate, they were met with little resistance. The corporation reported it would raise wages to 60 cents/hour for men and 45 cents/hour for women.

After the initial agreement, Hershey laid off some union organizers as part of what company president William Murrie said to be part of seasonal cutbacks. The CIO argued that Hershey violated the promise of job security for union organizers in their March agreement. Union members met back at the firehouse on April 1, 1937 and chose to take action on behalf of its members.

=== Strike ===
On April 2, 1937 at eleven in the morning, union president Russell "Bull" Behman waved a red handkerchief outside the Hershey chocolate factory and signaled the strike was on. In a matter of minutes, the machines were switched off and whole buildings went silent. Some sat down at their posts, others went outside to picket, and hundreds took to the roofs of factory buildings along Chocolate Avenue. During lunchtime, the workers still loyal to Hershey went home. It is unclear how many actually took part in the strike—organizers claim 1,200 while Hershey executives say 400. Strikers decided they would sit-down in shifts. Food would be supplied by a union kitchen, surveillance cameras would make sure Hershey's property was not damaged, and smoking was banned in sanitary areas of the factory. The CIO flag flew above the factory, replacing the traditional American flag.

The first few days of the strike seemed peaceful as strikers smiled for cameras and were optimistic about negotiations. Strikers described the sit-down as "more like a family squabble than an angry revolution". But workers were no longer dealing with Milton Hershey; instead, they faced new executive William Murrie, who was strongly anti-union. Murrie announced that the company would not bargain until the strikers left the factory.

=== Dairy farmers ===
Hershey's mostly positive reputation meant that strikers faced resistance from many fronts. The chocolate factory had three thousand workers, and the larger corporation employed nearly two thousand people in other areas of the company that wanted nothing to do with the strike. The most resistance came from thousands of dairy farmers from surrounding areas who relied on selling their milk to the Hershey factory. They were losing 800,000 pounds of milk per day—enough to supply a city of a million people. These dairy farmers were natural allies to the anti-union groups because they were losing money each day the factory stayed closed.

On Monday, April 5, the fourth day of the strike, dairy farmers met with strikers to discuss lost milk sales. The strikers decided to help the farmers by agreeing to operate the factory's creamery so the milk could be processed. The next day, Hershey milkmen failed to pick up the milk.

On the evening of April 6, 1937, several thousand loyal workers and farmers marched through Palmyra in support of the Hershey Chocolate Corporation.

=== Violence ===
By eleven o’clock the next morning of April 7, more than three thousand Hershey supporters rallied to remove the strikers. They decided to give the strikers an ultimatum—leave the plant by 1:00 or face forcible eviction. Executive Murrie and head union organizers Bull Behman and John Loy had agreed to end the strike, and asked Murrie to intervene to prevent violence.

Seemingly averting violence, it is unclear why men from the rally spontaneously grabbed bats, billy clubs, and hammers and ran to the factory. In minutes there were thousands outside the factory. After several insults from strikers inside, they stormed the factory. The anti-union loyalists outnumbered the strikers four to one. Dozens were injured, and the three leading union organizers, Behman, Loy, and a CIO man named Miles Sweeney were severely beaten. Sweeney had been hit with a baseball bat, Loy lost several teeth, and stones were thrown at them as they left the factory.

== Aftermath ==
In the days after the strike, the National Labor Relations Board (NLRB) investigated the Hershey company and required that they hold a union election. The chocolate workers chose a small, loyalist organization called the Independent Chocolate Workers of Hershey over the CIO by a landslide. However, federal authorities found the election was not legitimate and called for a second election. The second election in 1939 favored the Bakery and Confectionery Workers International Union with the AFL. The chocolate workers’ new contract under the AFL gave them an increase in overtime rates, paid vacations, and a procedure for arbitrating grievances.

== Historical significance ==
The Hershey Chocolate Workers’ Strike is notable because of its historical timing. The chocolate strike came in the middle of a massive wave of CIO strikes and specifically sit-down strikes. In March 1937, the sit-down strikes prominence peaked. There were sit-down strikes in 170 occupations, involving 167,210 workers. The Hershey strikers were organizing around the same time as the famous strike at the General Motors Corporation in Flint, Michigan, although it did not gain the same momentum.
