= Judd–Ofelt theory =

Theory in physical chemistry

Judd–Ofelt theory is a theory in physical chemistry describing the intensity of electron transitions within the 4f shell of rare-earth ions in solids and solutions. It provides a mathematical framework for predicting and analyzing the spectra of rare-earth ions in solids and solutions, in particular branching ratios, radiative lifetimes, and oscillator strengths.

== Theory ==
Judd-Ofelt theory may be used to predict and analyze the intensities of intra 4f electronic dipole transitions. Such transitions are disallowed by Electronic Dipole Transition Selection rules in free space, as the initial and final states have the same parity. However, intra 4f transitions have been observed. The transition strengths and the transition changing the orbital angular momentum quantum number are not consistent with them being Magnetic Dipole Transitions.

This apparent discrepancy is reconciled by treating the crystal field an ion in a solid experiences as a perturbation to the free space Hamiltonian. This perturbation mixes free space electronic states of opposite parity (namely the rare earth ion's ground 4f^{n} electronic configuration with the opposite parity 4f^{n-1}5d). Thus Electronic Dipole transitions between these crystal field perturbed electronic states do not violate this parity change selection rule.

The theory quantitatively describes this mixing using three phenomenological parameters particular to the host crystal, denoted as $\Omega_\lambda$ (where $\lambda = 2, 4, 6$). These parameters account for the asymmetric nature of the crystal field and enable the calculation of transition probabilities, oscillator strengths, and radiative lifetimes of excited states, which are crucial for the development of various photonic devices such as lasers and optical amplifiers.

Like Russell-Saunders Coupling (LS-Coupling), Judd-Ofelt theory can be simplified to a list of selection rules. The rules for Judd-Ofelt Induced Electric dipole transitions are listed in the following table and compared to LS-coupling Magnetic and Electric dipole transitions.

Term symbols in LS-Coupling describe the total orbital angular momentum ($L$), total spin ($S$), and total angular momentum ($J=S+L$). $\pi$ is the parity of an electronic configuration.

Judd-Ofelt Induced	LS-Coupling	
Electric dipole	Magnetic dipole	Electric dipole
$\Delta S = 0$
$|\Delta L| \leq 6$	$\Delta L = 0$	$\Delta L = 0,\pm 1$ but $L_i=0 \not \leftrightarrow L_f=0$
$|\Delta J| \leq 6$ but $|\Delta J|=2,4,6$ if $J_i,J_f=0$	$|\Delta J| \leq 1$ but $J_i=0 \not \leftrightarrow J_f=0$	
No restriction	$\pi_i=\pi_f$	$\pi_i=-\pi_f$

=== Example: Europium (III) ===
For example let us apply these selection rules to triply ionized Europium (Eu^{3+}). Eu^{3+} has an electronic configuration of [Xe]4f^{6}. The ground term symbol for this configuration (according to Hund's Rules) is ^{7}F_{0}.

Applying the above selection rules, transitions from this state to ^{5}D_{2}, ^{5}D_{4}, and ^{5}D_{6} are allowed, but not to ^{5}D_{1}, ^{5}D_{0}, or ^{5}L_{7} (violating the restrictions on $J$).

== History ==
The theory was introduced independently in 1962 by Brian R. Judd of the University of California, Berkeley, and PhD candidate George S. Ofelt at Johns Hopkins University. Their work was published in Physical Review and the Journal of Chemical Physics, respectively.

Judd-Ofelt Theory has become a standard tool in the field of lanthanide spectroscopy, providing insights into the optical properties of rare earth-doped materials and aiding in the design of materials for color display systems, fluorescent lamps, and lasers. Brian M. Walsh of NASA Langley places Judd and Ofelt's theory at the "forefront" of a 1960s revolution in spectroscopic research on rare-earth ions.

Author	Title	Year
Brian Judd	Optical Absorption Intensities of Rare-Earth Ions	1962
George S. Olfelt	Intensities of Crystal Spectra of Rare-Earth Ions	1962

== Analysis software ==
Judd–Ofelt intensity parameters can be calculated from absorption spectrum of any lanthanide by the RELIC analysis software. The intensity parameters and derived quantities (oscillator strengths, radiative transition probabilities, luminescence branching ratios, excited state radiative lifetimes, and estimates of quantum efficiencies) of Eu^{3+} doped compounds, can be obtained by the JOES application software from their emission spectrum. Theoretical Judd-Ofelt intensity parameters for Eu^{3+} can be obtained using the LUMPAC software. Additionally, the JOYSpectra web platform provides these parameters for all Ln^{3+} ions.

== See also ==
- Parity (physics)
- Bert Broer
- Otto Laporte
- Giulio Racah
- John Hasbrouck Van Vleck
- Eugene Wigner
- Brian Garner Wybourne
