= Constance Ahrons =

American psychotherapist (1937–2021)

Constance Ruth Ahrons (April 16, 1937 - November 29, 2021) was an American psychotherapist. She was an early advocate of collaborative divorce.

== Biography ==
Constance Ruth Ahrons was born on April 16, 1937, in Brooklyn, New York to immigrants Jacob and Estelle Ahrons. She attended Upsala College but dropped out when she married lawyer Jac Weiseman and had a baby. After reading The Feminine Mystique, she returned to Upsala and graduated in 1964. In 1967, she received her master's degree in social work from the University of Wisconsin. In 1967, she married therapist Morton Perlmutter.

Ahrons received her Ph.D. in Counseling Psychology from the University of Wisconsin, Madison, in 1973. She took a professorship in sociology at the University of Southern California in 1984. In 1996 she was the director of the Marriage and Family Therapy Training Program at USC. She taught there until 2001. She is known for her research in marriage and divorce which cumulated in the book The Good Divorce. In 1977 she began researching divorce which is then used in the book to champion collaborative divorce at a time when divorce was stigmatizing and coined the term "binuclear." Conservative critics saw her work as contributing to the decline of the nuclear family.

Ahrons ended her life through physician-assisted suicide at her home in San Diego on November 29, 2021, after being diagnosed with lymphoma.

== Honors and awards ==
- Radcliffe Institute Fellow, 2000-2001
- Outstanding Achievement Award from the Wisconsin Library Literary Association for the book The Good Divorce (HarperCollins, 1994), 1995

== Books ==
- The Good Divorce: Keeping your family together when your marriage comes apart (HarperCollins, 1994). ISBN 0060169737
- Divorced Families: a multidisciplinary developmental view. with Roy H. Rodgers. 1st ed. New York : W.W. Norton, c1987. ISBN 0393700305
- "We're still family": What grown children have to say about their parents' divorce. 1st ed. New York : HarperCollins, c2004. ISBN 0060193050

== Selected articles ==
- "Family ties after divorce: Long‐term implications for children." Family process 46, no. 1 (2007): 53–65.
- "The continuing coparental relationship between divorced spouses." American Journal of Orthopsychiatry 51, no. 3 (1981): 415.
- "The binuclear family." Alternative lifestyles 2, no. 4 (1979): 499–515.
- with Richard B. Miller. "The effect of the postdivorce relationship on paternal involvement: A longitudinal analysis." American Journal of Orthopsychiatry 63, no. 3 (1993): 441–450.
- "Divorce: A crisis of family transition and change." Family Relations (1980): 533–540.
