= Mark Petrokovets =

Soviet and Belarusian tribologist (1937–2006)

- Born: 10 April 1937; Gomel, Byelorussian Soviet Socialist Republic, Soviet Union
- Died: 18 November 2006 (aged 69); Gomel, Belarus
- Citizenship: USSR; Belarus
- Education: Francysk Skaryna Gomel State University
- Known for: study of materials science and tribology
- Scientific career
- Fields: Tribology; Polymer physics
- Workplaces: Metal–Polymer Research Institute of National Academy of Sciences of Belarus
- Doctoral advisor: Vladimir Bely

Mark Iosifovich Petrokovets (Russian: Марк Ио́сифович Петрокове́ц; 10 April 1937 – 18 November 2006) was a Soviet and Belarusian scientist prominent in the fields of tribology, the study of frictional interaction between surfaces, and well known for his classical influential handbooks "Introduction to Tribology" and "Friction and wear in polymer-based materials".

== Biography ==
Mark Petrokovets was born to a Jewish family in Gomel, Belarus, on April 10, 1937. He graduated with MS in mathematics from Francysk Skaryna Gomel State University in 1959. He spent 3 years as a high school teacher in Brest region. In 1963, he was invited to Gomel Institute of Mathematics and Computer Science (it was later renamed to Metal–Polymer Research Institute of National Academy of Sciences of Belarus), where he spent all his life, working as a lab technician, senior mechanic, junior, senior, lead and chief researcher. He obtained PhD degree from Latvian Academy of Sciences in 1970. The main focus of his research was the mechanics of the actual area of touch with viscoelastic contact. He received Doctor of Science degree in 1993. His doctoral thesis were dedicated to developing models of discrete contact in relation to metal-polymer friction nodes.

For many years, Mark Petrokovets was a member of the editorial board of the international scientific journals "Friction and Wear” and “Materials, Technology, Tools”. He was a member of Society of Tribologists and Lubrication Engineers (STLE).

== Research ==
Mark Petrokovets’ scientific work was associated with geometric and thermal calculations of metal-polymer gears, the development of methods for calculating thin-layer plain bearings, assessment of the deformity of polymers. He developed original approaches to solving the problems of tribology, which can include

- the problems of modeling discrete friction contact,
- the development of calculated methods of determining the actual area of touch,
- the creation of an adequate model of friction and wear of polymers and composite materials.

In the last decade of his life, Mark Petrokovets was actively engaged in the problems of discrete contact at the nanometer scale. He is the author of more than 100 scientific works and publications, including 7 monographs. Mark Petrokovets was a co-author of the collective monograph "Tribology. Research and applications: The experience of the USA and ex-USSR", published simultaneously in English and Russian.

== Selected publications ==
- Introduction to Tribology. N. K. Myshkin, C. K. Kim, M. I. Petrokovets. Cheong Moon Gak Publishers, Seoul, 1997.
- Friction and wear in polymer-based materials. V. A. Bely, A. I. Sviridenok, M. I. Petrokovets, V. G. Savkin. Pergamon Press, Oxford, 1982. ISBN 978-0-08-025444-9.
- Tribology of polymers: adhesion, friction, wear, and mass-transfer. M. I. Petrokovets, N. K. Myshkin, A. V. Kovalev. Tribology International, vol.38, p. 910-921.
- Tribology. Principles and applications (in Russian). N. K. Myshkin, M. I. Petrokovets. Gomel, IMMS NANB, 2002.

== See also ==
- Belarusian encyclopedia, vol.12, Minsk, 2000, p. 332
- The path to science: Notable doctors and professors - graduates of Gomel Universities // Issue II, F. Skaryna Gomel State University, 2005.
