= Battle of Pozoblanco =

Coordinates: 38°23′N 4°51′W

- Part of the Spanish Civil War
Date	March 6 – April 16, 1937
Location	Pozoblanco, Spain
Result	Republican victory

Belligerents
(Spain) Spanish Republic	Nationalist Spain

Commanders and leaders
(Spain) Gabriel Morales (Spain) Joaquín Pérez Salas (Spain) Enrique García Moreno	(Spain) Gonzalo Queipo de Llano

The Battle of Pozoblanco took place between 6 March and 16 April 1937, during the Spanish Civil War. The battle saw Republican troops defeat Nationalist attempts to take the town.
