= Fruitdale, Dallas =

Coordinates: 32.708°N 96.771°W

Fruitdale, sometimes called Fruitdale Acres, is an area in Dallas, Texas, United States that was formerly its own incorporated city.

On April 17, 1937 Fruitdale incorporated so it would not be annexed by Dallas. In October 1964, residents voted to disincorporate and Dallas annexed Fruitdale in November of that year.
