= B'nai B'rith Europe =

International Jewish social service organization

B'nai B'rith in Europe, a regional division of B'nai B'rith, an international Jewish social service organization. The first B'nai B'rith lodge ever established outside of the United States was in Berlin in 1882. A central entity known as B'nai B'rith was established in 1999. Activities of the central B'nai B'rith Europe include co-organizing the European Day of Jewish Culture. The event was originally a 1996 initiative known as European Jewish Heritage Day and was launched by B'nai B'rith Europe in France .

== History ==
The first formation of B'nai B'rith was in 1843 by a group of New York Jews of German origin who established a group known as Bundes Bruder (Brothers' League). While the early philanthropic efforts of the group were directed only within the United States, in the early 1880s, in response to the pogroms in Tsarist Russia, efforts were made to establish B'nai B'rith chapters in Europe. The first chapters established were in Berlin (1882) and in Romania (1889).

The establishment of B'nai B'rith in Northern Europe dates back to 1912 with the establishment of the Denmark Lodge in Copenhagen. The decision to establish the lodge was made by B'nai B'rith members in Chicago. The Chicago B'nai B'rith instructed members of a lodge in Germany to establish the new Danish lodge. The lodge's founding president was Just Cohen and the vice-president was Chief Rabbi Max Schornstein. The first B'nai B'rith lodge established in the Netherlands was the Hollandia lodge inaugurated in 1923.

By the 1920s, B'nai B'rith membership in Europe had grown to 17,500—nearly half of the U.S. membership This expansion on the European continent continued until the rise of Nazism and the Holocaust. In 1937, prior to the Holocaust, the Nazi regime ordered the gestapo to raid all B'nai B'rith chapters in Germany. The raid occurred on April 9, 1937 and resulted in the Nazi regime declaring the dissolution of the organisation in Germany, as well as the confiscation of all B'nai B'rith property.

Following the Holocaust, B'nai B'rith Europe was re-founded in 1948. Members of the Basel and Zurich lodges and representatives from lodges in France and Holland who had survived the Holocaust attended the inaugural meeting. In 2000, the new European B'nai B'rith district merged with the United Kingdom district to become a consolidated B'nai B'rith Europe with active involvement in all institutions of the European Union. By 2005 B'nai B'rith Europe comprised lodges in more than 20 countries including the former Communist Eastern Europe.
