= May 1937 =

Month of 1937

<<	May 1937					>>
Su	Mo	Tu	We	Th	Fr	Sa
						1
2	3	4	5	6	7	8
9	10	11	12	13	14	15
16	17	18	19	20	21	22
23	24	25	26	27	28	29
30	31

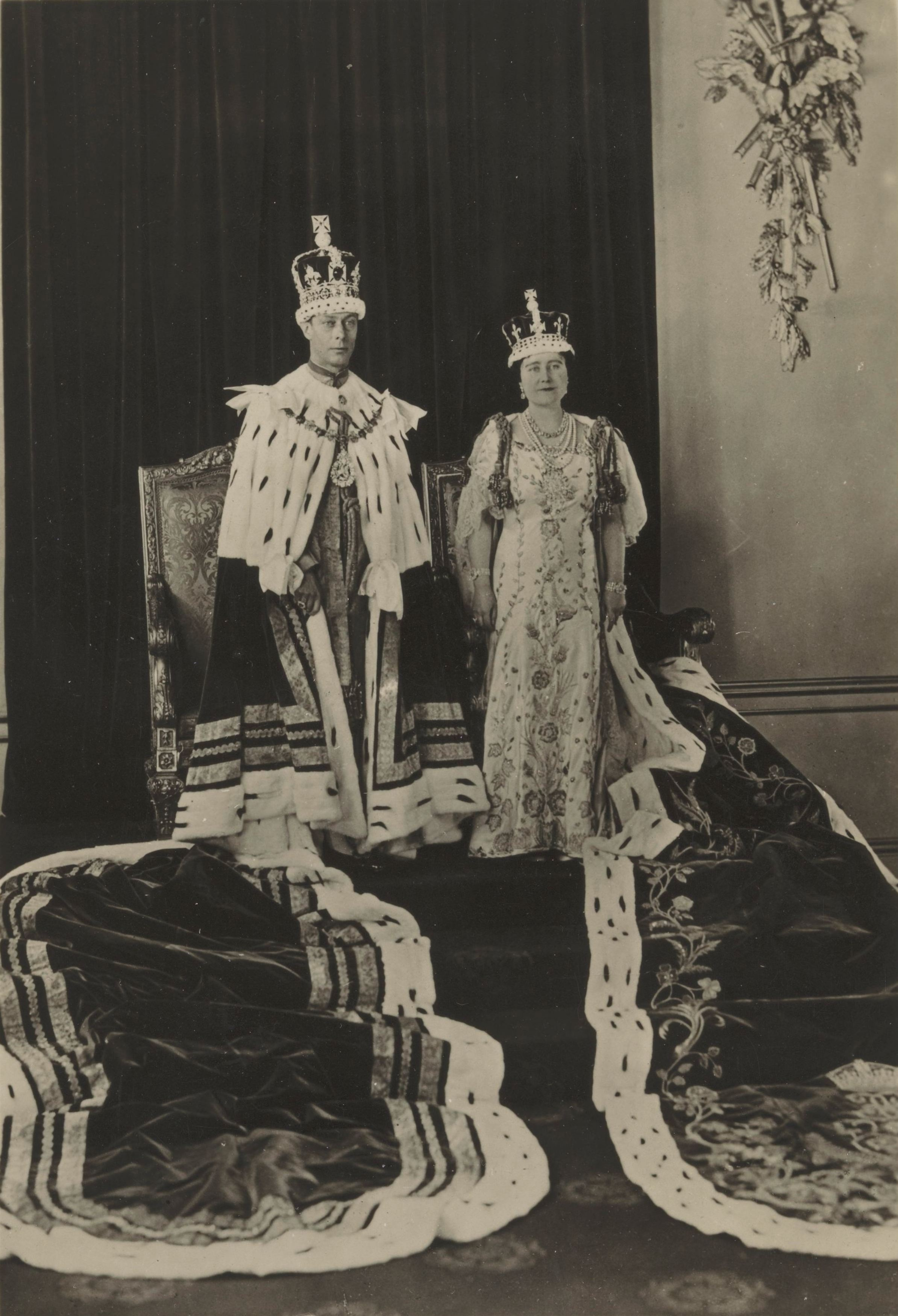
May 12, 1937: The coronation of George VI and Elizabeth as King and Queen consort of the British Empire is held at Westminster Abbey in London.

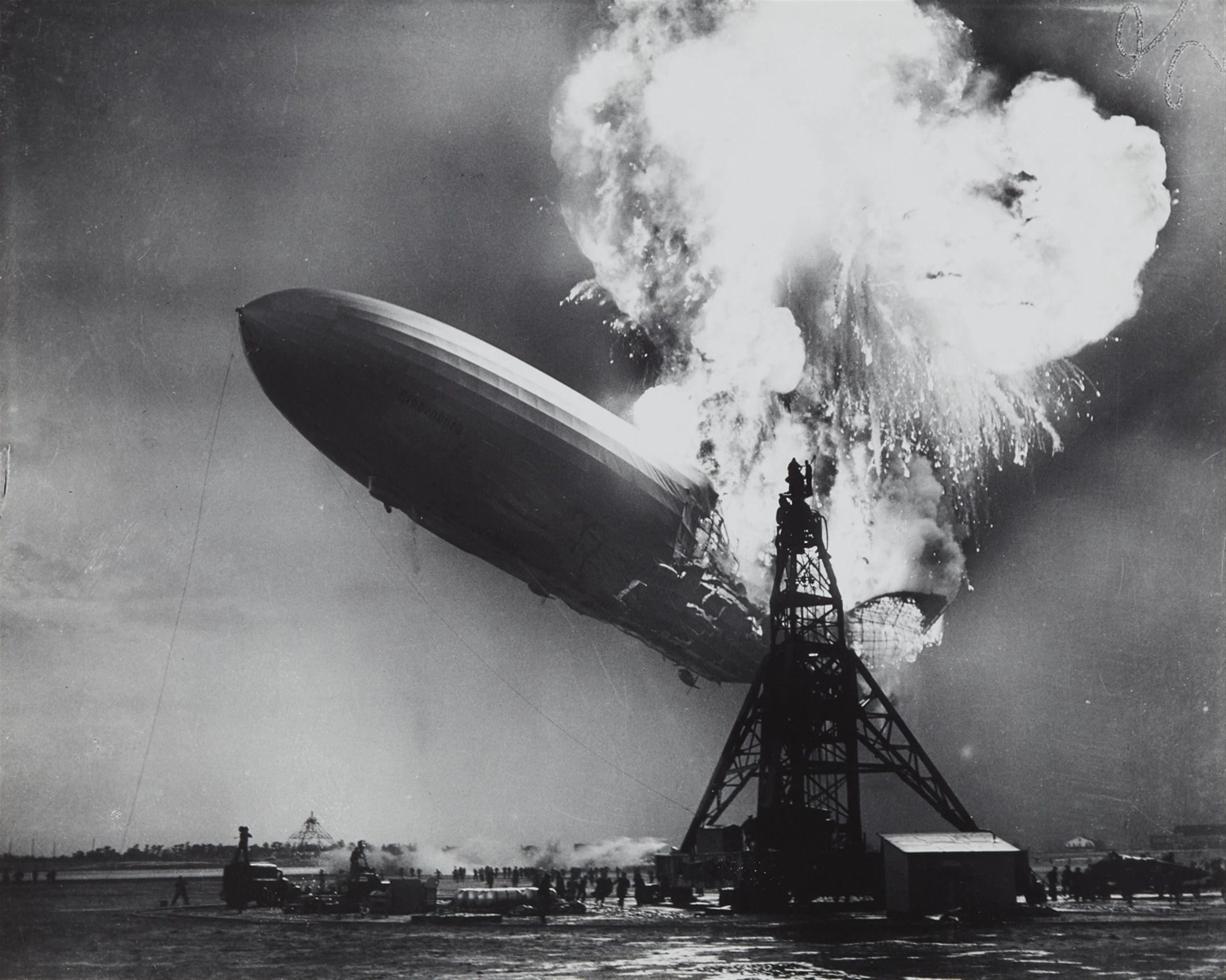
May 6, 1937: Explosion of the German dirigible Hindenburg kills 36 people

The following events occurred in May 1937:

== May 1, 1937 (Saturday) ==
- Germany's Nazi Party (NSDAP) lifted its restriction, in place since 1933, against admitting new members. All government employees were required to join the NSDAP or to relinquish their jobs. Multiple people were admitted on the same day, including war criminals Klaus Barbie, Dr. Franz Lucas, Friedrich Flick, Lothar Fendler, Heinz Pannwitz and Rudolf Lange; Sigrid Hunke, journalists Kurt DuMont and Gerhard Dengler; athlete Rudolf Harbig, musicians Paul Rostock, Werner Conze, Otto Jochum and Ludwig Hoelscher; former members of nobility Ernst II, Duke of Saxe-Altenburg, Louis, Prince of Hesse and by Rhine, Princess Alexandra of Saxe-Coburg and Gotha, General Heinrich von Maur.
- The Neutrality Act of 1937, a joint resolution of the U.S. Congress, took effect to extend previous laws. Under the new rules, which applied for the first time to participants in civil wars, U.S. citizens were forbidden from traveling on ships of "belligerent nations" that were either engaged in war against another nation, or had an ongoing civil war. U.S. ships were prohibited from transporting passengers or certain categories of freight to belligerents. The law had an exception, however, where the U.S. president could permit the sale of materials and supplies to belligerents in Europe as long as the recipients arranged for the transport and paid immediately with cash, making it possible to provide aid to the United Kingdom and to France involvement in a war with Germany. In addition, oil and nonmilitary vehicles were could be sold to nations involved in a war.
- The Order of the German Eagle (Verdienstorden vom Deutschen Adler) was authorized by Adolf Hitler in Nazi Germany as an award for foreign officials. Among the recipients would be Benito Mussolini of Italy, Francisco Franco of Spain, King Boris III of Bulgaria, Admiral Admiral Miklós Horthy of Hungary, Prime Minister Hideki Tojo of Japan, President Risto Ryti of Finland, and Americans Charles Lindbergh, Henry Ford, and Thomas J. Watson.
- Bus travel in London came to a halt as 26,000 bus drivers went on strike.
- New York's Mayor Fiorello H. La Guardia backed the refusal by License Commissioner Paul Mossto of renewing the licenses of all 14 burlesque theaters in the city, shutting down the sites of most vaudeville and stand-up comedy routines. La Guardia pledged "a bitter fight to the finish" against the "filth" of the houses, including displays of female nudity. On May 3, Isidore Herk, owner of the Gaiety Theatre in Times Square, proposed a compromise of self-censorship where the shows allowed at his three theaters would be cleaned up and remove the word "burlesque" from its advertisements, a suggestion that allowed his burlesque houses to remain open.
- In the Spanish Civil War, the supporters of the Second Spanish Republic were able to defeat the attack by Francisco Franco's nationalists in the siege of Santuario de Nuestra Señora de la Cabeza.
- Manchester City F.C. finished the season in first place in the highest division of England's Football League, with a record of 22 wins and 13 draws for 57 points. Charlton Athletic F.C. was second with 21 wins and 12 draws for 54 points.
- Sunderland, the defending 1936 league champion, which had finished eighth in the First Division for 1936–37, defeated 14th place Preston North End, 3–1 in the FA Cup Final at Wembley Stadium before a crowd of 93,435 people.
- Born:
  - Agim Krajka, Albanian composer; in Kavajë (d. 2021)
  - Robert Garland, American screenwriter known for The Electric Horseman (1979) and No Way Out; in Brooklyn, New York City (d. 2020)
  - Una Stubbs, British actress and dancer; in Welwyn Garden City (d. 2021)
- Died:
  - Snitz Edwards, (stage name for Edward Neumann), 69, Hungarian-born American character actor on stage and film
  - Fanny Marc (Estelle Odile Fanny Legendre), 79, French sculptor

== May 2, 1937 (Sunday) ==
- Austrian police raided the headquarters of the Nazi Party in Vienna, finding evidence of collaboration between German and Austrian Nazis, as well as propaganda hostile to the Austrian government.
- In Moscow, an estimated 50,000 people attended the remaining churches in the city for services on the Russian Easter, despite the largest anti-religious drive since 1930.
- In Cuba, former President Mario García Menocal, who served from 1913 to 1921, announced that he was creating a new political party to oppose military interference in civil affairs, in a move seen as a threat to the military-supported regime of President Federico Laredo Brú and its control of the Cuban Congress.
- Eleven of the crew of the freighter Alecto were drowned after the ship collided with the freighter Plavnik and sank in the North Sea while both sailed in a fog.
- Born:
  - Gisela Elsner, German writer, subject of the 2000 film No Place to Go; in Nuremberg (committed suicide, 1992)
  - Lorenzo Music (Gerald David Music), American actor, television producer and musician, co-creator of The Bob Newhart Show in 1972, as well as being the voice of Garfield the cat in cartoons and the voice of the unseen character of Carlton the Doorman in Rhoda; in Brooklyn, New York City (d. 2001)

== May 3, 1937 (Monday) ==
- The divorce of Mrs. Wallis Warfield Simpson from her husband, shipbroker Ernest Simpson, became final, clearing the way for her to marry the Duke of Windsor, who had been King Edward VIII of the United Kingdom and the British Dominions. The marriage took place one month later in France on June 3.
- Lev Karakhan, the Soviet Union's Ambassador to Turkey since 1934, was arrested on orders of Soviet leader Joseph Stalin to return to Moscow. Stalin had ordered the recall of Karakhan on April 26. Karakhan was arrested and charged with participation in a "pro-fascist conspiracy" to overthrow the Soviet Government. He would be executed on September 20 after being tried before the Military Collegium of the Supreme Court of the Soviet Union.
- German opera composer and conductor Manfred Gurlitt, a member of Germany's Nazi Party since 1933, was expelled from the Nazis by court order after failing to reveal that he had a Jewish ancestor. The court declared that Gurlitt was a "Jew of Mixed Race of the 2nd Order" and removed him from his employment.
- In Spain, six days of civil violence known as the May Days began in Catalonia.
- Born: Hans Cieslarczyk, German footballer; in Herne (d. 2020)
- Died:
  - Cosimo Rennella, Ecuadorian-born Italian flying ace during World War One with seven victories and later a member of the Air Force of Ecuador, died of pneumonia after returning from the United States, where head attended a convention of fellow World War I aces in Dayton, Ohio
  - P. W. Pilcher, 70, British photographer who perfected high-speed photography to capture photos of moving objects, including trains

== May 4, 1937 (Tuesday) ==
- The Duke of Windsor and Wallis Warfield (ex-Simpson) reunited in France after six months apart and immediately became officially engaged.
- The Non-Intervention Committee asked both sides in the Spanish Civil War to forswear bombing of open cities.
- Born:
  - Ron Carter, American jazz double-bassist, winner of three Grammy Awards and the most-recorded jazz bassist in history; in Ferndale, Michigan
  - Dick Dale (stage name for Richard Monsour), American surf rock guitarist; in Boston, Massachusetts (d. 2019)
  - Mel Edwards, American abstract sheet-metal sculptor; in Houston
- Died:
  - Vasily Petrov, 62, Soviet Russian opera singer
  - Noel Rosa, 26, Brazilian musician, died of tuberculosis.

== May 5, 1937 (Wednesday) ==
- Pavel Golovin became the world's first pilot to fly an airplane over the North Pole, as part of a crew of 11 people. After flying over the pole, Golovin landed on an ice floe 13 miles (21 km) southward. Golovin was the world's first pilot to fly an airplane over the North Pole, on 5 May 1937. The first flight over the North Pole had been made in the dirigible Nord by pilot Umberto Nobile and polar explorers Lincoln Ellsworth and Roald Amundsen on May 13, 1926.
- Spanish Prime Minister Francisco Largo Caballero sent the Guardia de Asalto to Barcelona to put down the May Days violence.
- British Prime Minister Stanley Baldwin pleaded for labour peace ahead of the coronation of George VI as the bus strike threatened to spread.
- Born:
  - Trần Đức Lương, President of Vietnam from 1997 to 2006; in Đức Phổ, Quảng Ngãi province, French Indochina (d. 2025)
- Died: Camillo Berneri, 39, Italian anarchist and professor, was forcibly removed from his home by policemen and a group of men wearing red armbands. Taken also was his friend Francesco Barbieri, and the two men were shot to death.

== May 6, 1937 (Thursday) ==
newsreel report of the disaster

- The Hindenburg disaster occurred in Lakehurst, New Jersey, killing 36 people. Newsreel footage of the tragedy would be shown around the world, shattering the public's confidence in the dirigible as a method of transportation. Herbert Morrison of the Chicago radio station WLS recorded while the explosion was happening. The recording of it was played by WLS the next day in what remains as one of the most famous broadcasts in history.
- The Brazilian radio news network Radio Bandeirantes was inaugurated, broadcasting initially as an all-news station in São Paulo.
- The National Federation of Press Women was organized at a meeting in the U.S. city of Chicago by 39 women, after being organized by Helen Miller Malloch.
- Born: Rubin "Hurricane" Carter African-American boxer who served 20 years in prison after being wrongfully convicted of murder; in Clifton, New Jersey (d. 2014)

== May 7, 1937 (Friday) ==
- German aviation minister Hermann Göring ordered work rushed on the LZ 130 LZ 130 Graf Zeppelin II, which was to have been the sister ship of the Hindenburg.
- Chicago's radio station WLS played the first-ever broadcast of a pre-recorded news story as it aired a report made at the scene of the Hindenburg disaster. Newsman Herbert Morrison and engineer Charles Nielsen had been sent to Lakehurst, New Jersey to record the arrival of the German dirigible.
- The U.S. Congress passed neutrality legislation permitting the sale of certain commodities (excluding munitions) while making it illegal for U.S. citizens to travel on enemy ships.
- The musical film Shall We Dance starring Fred Astaire and Ginger Rogers was released. This film introduced the famous George and Ira Gershwin songs "Let's Call the Whole Thing Off" and "They Can't Take That Away from Me".
- Born:
  - Ryszard S. Michalski, Polish-born American computer scientist known for his development of attributional calculus; in Kalusz (d.2007)
  - Rolf Tibblin, Swedish motocross racer and winner of the motocross world championship in the 500cc division in 1962 and 1963; in Stockholm
- Died:
  - Ernst A. Lehmann, 50, German airship pilot and chairman of Deutsche Zeppelin-Reederei (DZR) Airlines, died the day after being severely burned in the explosion of the Hindenburg.
  - George Topîrceanu, 51, Romanian poet, short story writer and humorist, died of cancer of the liver.

== May 8, 1937 (Saturday) ==
- In Italy, aviator Mario Pezzi set an altitude record of 51,362 feet (15,655 m), departing from the Guidonia-Montecelio base in a Caproni Ca. 161 propeller-driven aircraft powered by a 14-cylinder double stellar engine supercharged by a double centrifugal 750 horsepower compressor. He would break his own record on October 22, 1938. For the flight, Pezzi wore a special electrically heated pressurized suit and an airtight oxygen helmet. The previous record was F. R. D. Swain of the Royal Air Force of Britain, who flew to 49,944 feet (15,223 m).
- Italy recalled its news correspondents from London and banned all British newspapers except for the Daily Mail, The Observer and The Evening News. The move was believed to have been taken in reaction to the British press mocking the recent defeats of Italian troops in the Spanish Civil War.
- War Admiral, a thoroughbred race horse who had only one defeat in eight starts won the Kentucky Derby, with jockey Charles Kurtsinger, by 1 1/4 lengths. He was then transported to Baltimore to compete in the Preakness Stakes.
- Widnes defeated Keighley 18–5 to win rugby's Challenge Cup in front of 47,699 at Wembley Stadium.
- The Montreux Convention Regarding the Abolition of the Capitulations in Egypt was concluded.
- The adventure film The Prince and the Pauper starring Errol Flynn and Billy and Bobby Mauch was released.
- Born:
  - Mike Cuellar, Cuban baseball player; in Santa Clara, Cuba (d. 2010)
  - Carlos Gaviria Díaz, Colombian justice and politician; in Sopetrán (d. 2015)
  - Thomas Pynchon, American novelist; in Glen Cove, New York

== May 9, 1937 (Sunday) ==
- The fifth last launch of a high altitude ARS rocket by the American Interplanetary Society was carried out from Old Ferris Point in the U.S. state of New York. The Society had launched rockets on multiple occasions since May 14, 1933. The rocket, propelled by a mixture of liquid oxygen and gasoline, reached an altitude of 80 metres (260 ft).
- At least 5,000 women and children began to evacuate Bilbao in Spain.
- More than 50 people were injured in Toulouse when a riot broke out between political factions. The rioting began when rightists paraded to an equestrian statue of Joan of Arc shouting "France for the French", referring to the allegation that the Popular Front government of Prime Minister Léon Blum took orders from Moscow.
- FC Sochaux-Montbéliard defeated RC Strasbourg, 2 to 1, to win the Coupe de France soccer football tournament, played near Paris at the Olympic Stadium in Colombes in front of 39,538 spectators.

== May 10, 1937 (Monday) ==
- Frozen food came to Britain when frozen asparagus went on sale for the first time.
- Born: G. Bradford Cook, American lawyer and Chairman of the U.S. Securities and Exchange Commission for two months in 1972 before being forced to resign because of scandal; in Lincoln, Nebraska (d.2014).
- Died:
  - Paul Émile Chabas, 68, French painter known for September Morn

== May 11, 1937 (Tuesday) ==
- Argentina's largest national park, Los Glaciares, with an area of 2,807 sq mi (7,270 km^{2}; 2,807 sq mi) was created as a federal protected area.
- Pablo Picasso began painting of his classic work Guernica, 15 days after Spanish Nationlists bombed the Spanish city at the direction of Francisco Franco.
- George VI met all the representatives of England's Dominions and colonies and pledged to carry on his father's work "for the welfare of our great empire." The speech made no mention of his brother Edward.
- The adventure film Captains Courageous starring Freddie Bartholomew and Spencer Tracy was released.
- Soviet astronomer and astrophysicist Yevgeny Perepyolkin of the Pulkovo Observatory, was arrested by the NKVD, along with other Pulkovo scientists, on charges of "counter-revolutionary agitation". After being sent to a labor camp at Krasnoyarsk Krai in Siberia, Perepyolkin would be executed on January 13, 1938.
- Died:

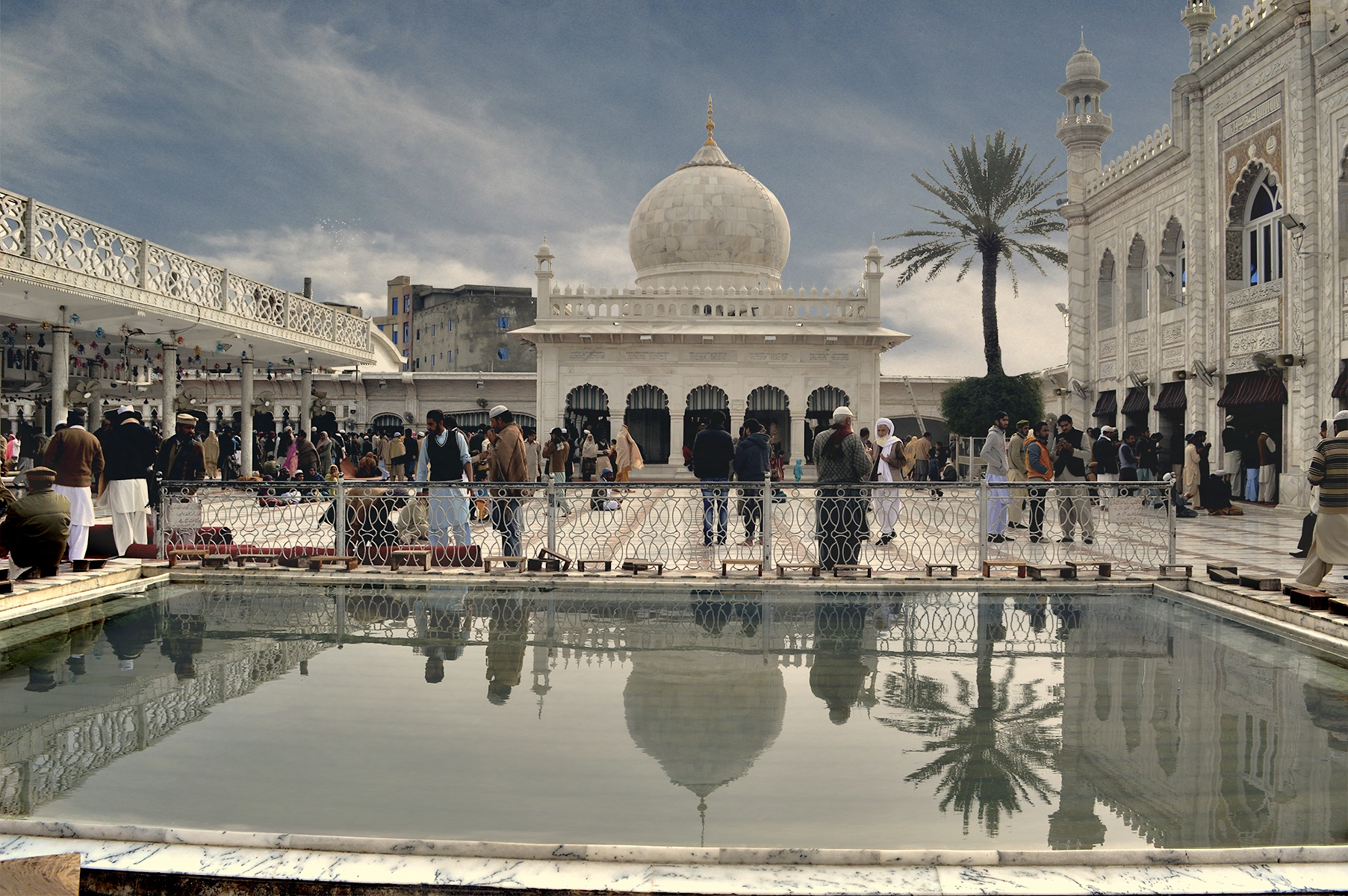
The shrine to Meher Ali Shah

  - Meher Ali Shah, 78, Punjabi Muslim Sufi scholar and mystic, and leader of the anti-Ahmadiya movement. Following his death, a shrine was constructed in Islamabad, now in Pakistan.
  - Afonso Costa, 66, Prime Minister of Portugal three times from 1913 to 1917.

== May 12, 1937 (Wednesday) ==
- The coronation of King George VI and Queen Elizabeth took place at Westminster Abbey in London. The date had originally been reserved for the abandoned coronation of Edward VIII, who served as king before his abdication in 1936.
- BBC Television made its first outdoor broadcast to cover the King's coronation procession.
- Wildlife photographer Eric Hosking became famous following an unusual accident when he was trying to take pictures of a tawny owl and the owl attacked him and clawed his left eye, which subsequently was removed."Attacked by Owl", Windsor (ON) Star, June 24, 1937, p. 10
- Born:
  - George Carlin, American comedian; in Manhattan, New York City (d. 2008)
  - Mário Viegas Carrascalão, Indonesian Governor of East Timor province from 1981 to 1992, who oversaw the transition from Indonesia-occupied territory to independence in 2002; in Vila Viçosa, Portuguese Timor (now Venilale, Democratic Republic of Timor-Leste) (d.2017).
- Died:
  - Ed Martin, African-American boxer who was the World Colored Heavyweight Champion from 1902 to 1903
  - Carl Emil Pettersson, 61, Swedish sailor known for becoming the "King of Tabar Island" in what is now Papua New Guinea after he was shipwrecked there in 1904.

== May 13, 1937 (Thursday) ==
- The British destroyer HMS Hunter struck a naval mine south of Almería, Spain killing eight crewmembers.
- Antisemitic rioting broke out in three towns near Brześć-Litewski, Poland, after a police officer pushed a Jewish butcher and was stabbed to death by the butcher's son. Jewish-owned stores were looted and at least 53 Jews were injured during violence that continued into the next morning.
- Born:
  - Roger Zelazny, American science fiction and fantasy author known for The Chronicles of Amber book series, six-time Hugo Award winner; in Euclid, Ohio (d. 1995)
  - Yukihiko Ikeda, Foreign Minister of Japan from 1996 to 1997, and Defense Minister 1990 to 1991; in Kobe (d.2004)
  - Julia Blake, English-Australian TV and film actress known for Bellbird; in Bristol
  - Trevor Baylis, English inventor known for inventing the wind-up radio in 1992; in Kilburn, London (d. 2018)
  - Howard L. Resnikoff. American mathematician and inventor; in New York City (d. 2018)
  - Roch Carrier, French Canadian author known for his contes stories; in Sainte-Justine, Quebec
- Died: U.S. Army Major General John Clem, 85, nicknamed "Johnny Shiloh" known for having been the youngest noncommissioned officer in U.S. Army history, during the American Civil War at age 12

== May 14, 1937 (Friday) ==
- The 8th Imperial Conference began in London.
- The Governor of Puerto Rico, Blanton Winship, signed a bill providing for sterilization of the insane and the establishment of a eugenics board.

== May 15, 1937 (Saturday) ==
- Francisco Largo Caballero resigned as Prime Minister of Spain after the Socialists and Communists withdrew participation from his cabinet over his desire to give POUM clemency.
- "September in the Rain" by Guy Lombardo topped the American pop charts.
- War Admiral won the Preakness Stakes, the second race of the American Triple Crown of thoroughbred racing, only one week after winning the Kentucky Derby on May 8. As with the Derby, Pompoon finished second, but this time only by inches.
- Born:
  - Madeleine Albright, Czechoslovak-born American diplomat who served as the U.S. Secretary of State; as Marie Jana Körbelová in Prague (d. 2022)
  - Trini Lopez, American musician and actor; in Dallas (d. 2020)
- Died: Philip Snowden, 1st Viscount Snowden, 72, British Chancellor of the Exchequer in 1924 and from 1929 to 1931

== May 16, 1937 (Sunday) ==
- The murder of Laetitia Toureaux, a crime that was never solved, took place on a Paris Metro train in Paris. The 29-year-old factory worker, who was secretly assigned to infiltrate the far-right terrorist group La Cagoule, entered an occupied train car at the Porte de Charenton station at 6:27 p.m. and, during the 90 seconds before the train arrived at its next stop at the Porte Dorée station, she was stabbed in the neck by an assailant who had performed the homicide and departed the train car while it was in transit.
- Nationalists came within 7 miles (11 km) of the Basque capital of Bilbao, pushing the Republicans out of the village of Gorocica.
- Born:
  - Robert B. Wilson, American economist and recipient of the 2020 Nobel Memorial Prize in Economic Sciences; in Geneva, Nebraska
  - Yvonne Craig, American actress; in Taylorville, Illinois (d. 2015)

== May 17, 1937 (Monday) ==
- Juan Negrín became Prime Minister of Spain after being appointed by President Manuel Azaña.Graham, Helen (1988). "The Spanish Socialist Party in Power and the Government of Juan Negrín, 1937–9". European History Quarterly. 18 (2): 175–206. doi:10.1177/026569148801800203. S2CID 145387965.
- Råsunda Stadium was formally inaugurated in Stockholm. England defeated Sweden in a friendly match, 4–0.
- Born: Hazel R. O'Leary, United States Secretary of Energy from 1993 to 1997; in Newport News, Virginia

== May 18, 1937 (Tuesday) ==
- Sultan al-Atrash, nationalist leader who had led the Great Syrian Revolt against the French trusteeship government in the State of Syria and Greater Lebanon between 1925 and 1927, returned to Damascus.. Atrash, initially sentenced to death in 1927, had escaped a French prison. France issued a comprehensive amnesty of all rebels as part of the Franco-Syrian Treaty of Independence of 1936.
- The wedding date for Duke of Windsor, formerly King Edward VIII, and his recently divorced fiancée, Wallis Warfield was announced to take place on June 3, 1937, in France at the Château de Candé in Monts, Indre-et-Loire, France.

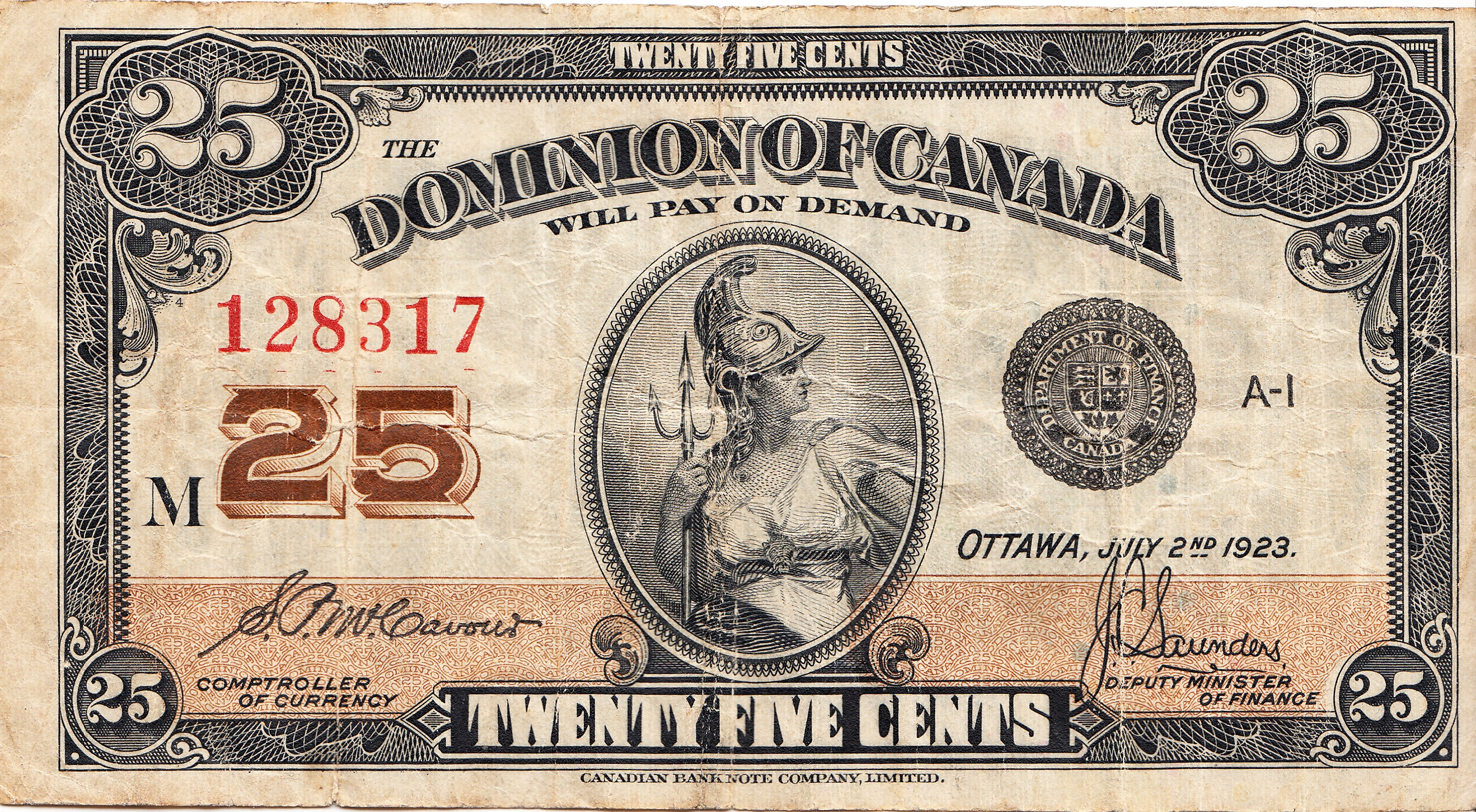
The 25-cent note

- Canada permanently withdrew its 25-cent banknote from circulation.
- Outgoing British Prime Minister Stanley Baldwin made the last significant speech of his time in office, in which he asked the youth of Britain to guard against the threats of fascism and communism and said that the League of Nations was of "doubtful" value.
- Archbishop of Chicago George Mundelein made the paper hanger speech, an anti-Nazi address that condemned the Nazi totalitarianism and spoke about how "a nation of 60 million intelligent people will submit in fear and servitude" to Hitler, whom he called an "alien, an Austrian paper hanger."
- Born:
  - Brooks Robinson, American baseball player, inductee to National Baseball Hall of Fame, American League MVP and RBI leader in 1964; in Little Rock, Arkansas (d. 2023)
  - Jacques Santer, Prime Minister of Luxembourg from 1984 to 1995 and President of the European Commission from 1995 to 1999; in Wasserbillig

== May 19, 1937 (Wednesday) ==
- The press in Nazi Germany demanded that the Vatican publicly repudiate the Archbishop of Chicago George Mundelein for his remarks comparing Adolf Hitler to a wallpaper hanger. "The cardinal insulted not only the head of the German state and its ministers but the entire German nation", an editorial in Der Angriff stated. "We make the Catholic church responsible if the speech evokes a new wave of anti-German agitation, and we ask the Vatican if it intends to tolerate this speech without protest."
- A constitution for the soon to be independent Republic of Hatay was approved by the League of Nations, to be formed within the Mandate for Syria and the Lebanon.
- King Victor Emmanuel III and Queen Elena of Italy made an official visit to Budapest.
- Angry about being called for a balk during the sixth inning of a game against the New York Giants, Dizzy Dean of the St. Louis Cardinals began throwing at Giants batters in the top of the ninth. When Dean went to cover first base on a bunt by Jimmy Ripple, the two got into a fistfight that started a bench-clearing brawl.
- Born: Ali Hamroyev, Soviet Uzbek film producer and director; in Tashkent, Uzbek SSR, Soviet Union
- Died:
  - Marie Selika Williams, African-American opera soprano and the first black entertainer to perform at the White House, appearing before President Rutherford B. Hayes in 1878
  - J. Henry Roraback, 67, U.S. politician and political boss who ran the Republican Party in Connecticut, committed suicide with his hunting rifle after returning from a hunt with his son.

== May 20, 1937 (Thursday) ==
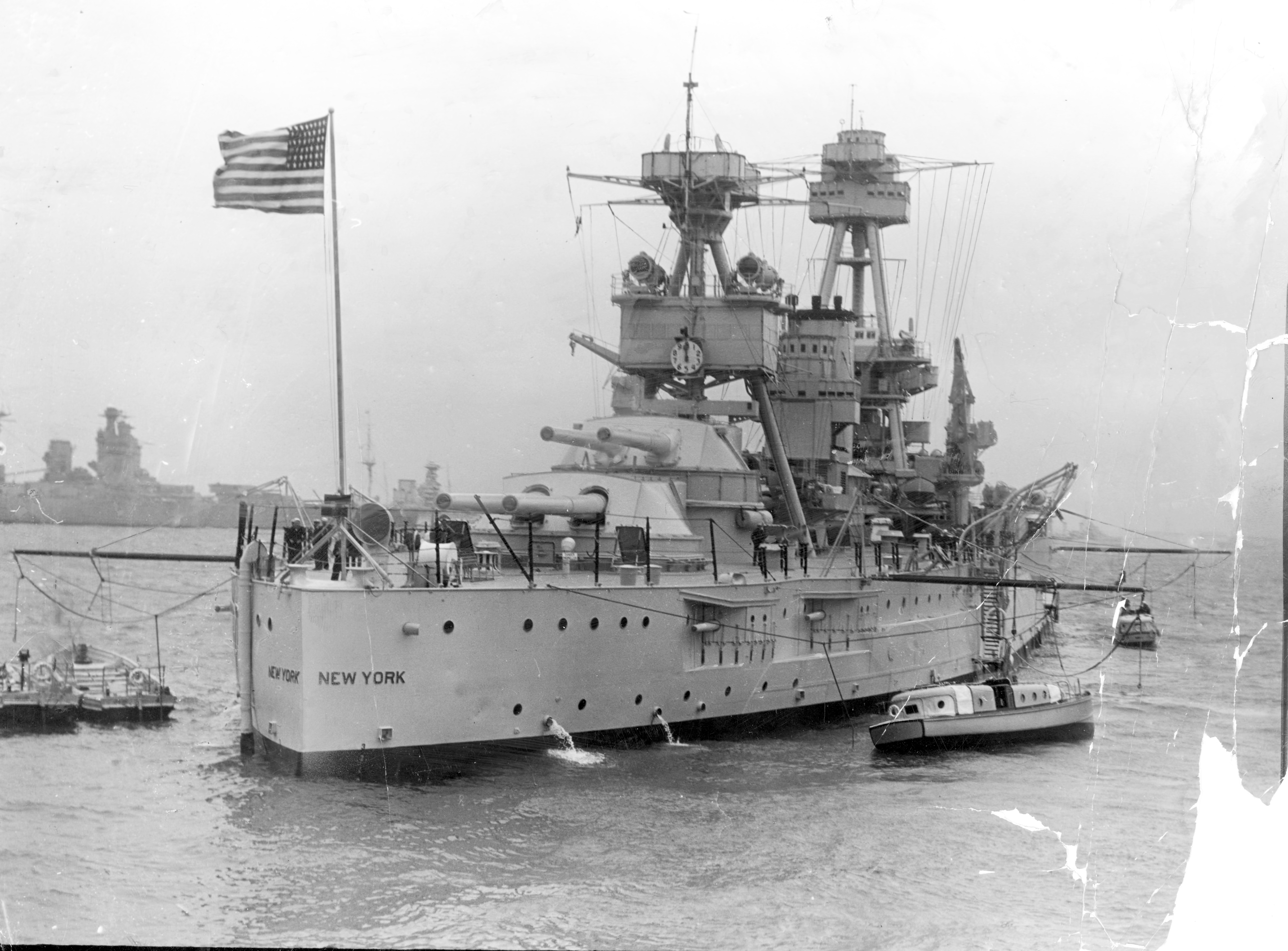
USS New York (BB-34) taking part in the Grand Fleet Review

- King George VI of Britain and the Commonwealth conducted the Coronation Fleet Review at Spithead. The event, described as "the last parade of the Royal Navy as the world's greatest and most prodigious navy" took place eight days after his coronation, and featured 101 warships, 22 submarines and 11 auxiliary reserve vessels, as well as warships from Canada, New Zealand and India, along with one warship apiece from 17 non-Commonwealth nations. A complement of commercial ships allowed to follow. This was the occasion of the famous Thomas Woodrooffe incident, when the BBC Radio commentator went on the air drunk and repeatedly slurred the phrase, "the fleet's lit up."
- The Soviet Union executed 44 people as spies for Japan.
- Denny Shute won the 20th PGA Championship, defeating Jug McSpaden in the final of a playoff that had started with eight golfers. The game took place at the Pittsburgh Field Club in Fox Chapel, Pennsylvania.
- Popular U.S. film actress Jean Harlow became seriously ill during the filming of her final movie, Saratoga, which would prove to be the highest-grossing film of the year. She would die 18 days later from kidney failure and cerebral edema.
- Died: Walter Davis, 48, Welsh footballer who had played for the Wales national team, was found dead in London, apparently after drowning while swimming at Bow Creek.

== May 21, 1937 (Friday) ==
- The Soviet Union established North Pole-1, the world's first drifting ice station, on an ice floe in the Arctic Ocean. Mikhail Vodopyanov became the first person to land an airplane at the North Pole, before flying supplies the 12 miles (19 km) distance to the station., the research station was officially opened on June 6, 1937.
- British mountaineers Frederick Chapman and the Sherpa guide Pasang Dawa Lama became the first persons to climb to the top of the 24,035 feet (7,326 m) mountain Jomolhari.
- Almost 4,000 Basque children were evacuated from the port of Santurtzi in Spain, boarding the Cuban ocean liner Habana for transport to the British port of Southampton, where it arrived on May 23.
- Mass arrests were made of former Communist Party officials in the Soviet Union of people accused of "counter-revolutionary activities", with Alexander Abramov-Mirov, AlexeyAksyonov, Kasyan Chaykovsky, Roman Longva, Georgy Potapov, Turar Ryskulov, Ivan Timoshin, Leonty Ugryumov and Konstantin Ukhanov being taken into custody. All nine would be executed within one year.
- The bodies of the 26 German victims of the Hindenburg tragedy arrived in Cuxhaven by ship. A state funeral was held in a local hall.
- Born:
  - Mengistu Haile Mariam, President of Ethiopia from 1977 to 1987 as Chairman of the Derg, and as president from 1987 to 1991; in Welayta
  - Sofiko Chiaureli, Soviet Georgian actress; in Tbilisi, Georgian SSR (d. 2008)
  - John Fairfax, British ocean rower and adventurer known for becoming (in 1969) the first person to row by himself across the Atlantic Ocean; in Rome, Italy (d. 2012)
  - Ricardo Alarcón, Foreign Minister of Cuba 1992 to 1993, and Cuban Representative to the United Nations, 1966 to 1978; in Havana (d.2002)
- Died:
  - Sir Alexander Grant, 72, Scottish philanthropist, businessman and confectionary manufacturer

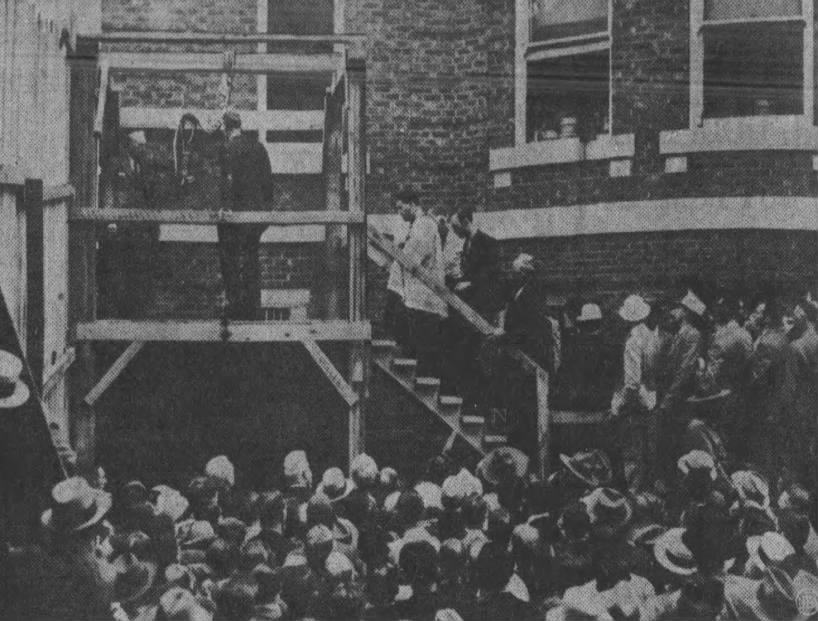
Roscoe Jackson prepares to be hanged.

  - Roscoe Jackson, 36, convicted murderer, became the last person in the U.S. to be publicly executed. A gallows was built in Galena, Missouri at the Stone County Courthouse and a crowd of 400 people watched his hanging. Jackson spoke to the crowd and reportedly said, "To ask anyone to forgive me is too much," and closed by saying "If you feel I am paying my debt like a man, I am glad."

== May 22, 1937 (Saturday) ==
- Saeed bin Maktoum bin Hasher Al Maktoum, Emir of Dubai (now part of the United Arab Emirates), signed a major agreement with the British oil company Petroleum Concessions Ltd (PCL) providing exploration and development rights to Dubai's oil fields in a lease that included a requirement that the company would have to provide jobs to Dubai's citizens.
- The New York Times reported, erroneously, that "The Soviet Union claimed the North Pole as its own today to hold forever on the grounds that it was the first to establish a permanent settlement in the vicinity," although the Associated Press noted only that "Eleven Soviet pioneers of the Arctic air routes" had claimed an ice floe 13 miles (21 km) from the Pole "as a preliminary to the proposed Moscow—San Francisco air line over the roof of the world.". The Times reported the next day the claim was limited to an area "for a inter-continental flight.
- Soviet General Mikhail Tukhachevsky was arrested and charged with conspiring against the government and spying for Nazi Germany.

== May 23, 1937 (Sunday) ==
- A group of 3,886 Basque children evacuated from Spain during the Spanish Civil War arrived in Southampton, along with 96 teachers, 118 assistants and 16 Catholic priests. The group was then taken to a large refugee camp in North Stoneham, Eastleigh, Hampshire.
- From his exile in Mexico City, former Soviet Communist Party official Leon Trotsky outlined a "Fourth International" to offer an alternative to Soviet leader Joseph Stalin's plans regarding the growth of Communist International (Comintern). Trotsky, Stalin and Lenin had been co-founders of Comintern in 1919. No Fourth International would ever be held, and Trotsky would be assassinated in 1940 on Stalin's orders, after which Stalin would dissolve Comintern in 1943.
- The National Synarchist Union was founded in Mexico by José Antonio Urquiza at a meeting in Guanajuato with 137 other people, with a goal of creating a pro-Catholic theocracy to govern Mexico.
- Amelia Earhart and her navigator, Fred Noonan, landed in Miami for a five-and-a-half week preparation period in advance of their departure on flying around the world. Because of a navigation error, Earhart's Lockheed Electra arrived at the wrong airport on 36th Street before departing again for the Miami Municipal Airport.
- Born: Irina Odagescu, Romanian symphonic composer; in Bucharest
- Died:
  - John D. Rockefeller, 97, American business magnate, multimillionaire and philanthropist known for founding the Standard Oil Company that held a monopoly on oil production, refining and sales in the United States during the 19th century, died at his home in Florida.
  - Pete Knight, 34, Canadian rodeo bronc rider and winner of the 1931 World Series of Rodeo, was killed when he was thrown from a horse and trampled at a rodeo in the U.S. at Hayward, California.
  - Pelham Horton Box, 39, British historian, died of Streptococcus pneumoniae.

== May 24, 1937 (Monday) ==
- Soviet Latvian politician Jānis Rudzutaks, one of the 15 full members of the Communist Party's ruling Politburo since 1926, was expelled after being accused of Trotskyism and espionage for Nazi Germany. The next day, he became the first Politburo member to be arrested, and the highest-ranking Soviet official to become a victim of the Great Purge started by Joseph Stalin. He would be executed on July 29, 1938.
- The U.S. Supreme Court upheld the constitutionality of the Social Security Act of 1935 in two different decisions. In Helvering v. Davis, the Court ruled, 7 to 2, that taxing employers to support old-age social security was part of the power of the U.S. Congress "to provide for the general welfare" as part of the Taxing and Spending Clause of Article I, Section 8 of the U.S. Constitution, and superseded the Tenth Amendment to the Bill of Rights providing that "The powers not delegated to the United States by the Constitution, nor prohibited by it to the States, are reserved to the States respectively, or to the people." The Court also ruled in Steward Machine Co. v. Davis, 5 to 4, that federal unemployment insurance was permissible under the General Welfare clause.
- Born: Roger Peterson, pilot of the aircraft that crashed, killing Buddy Holly, Ritchie Valens and J.P. Richardson on "The Day the Music Died"; in Alta, Iowa (d. 1959)
- Died: Luis F. Álvarez, 84, Spanish American physician

== May 25, 1937 (Tuesday) ==
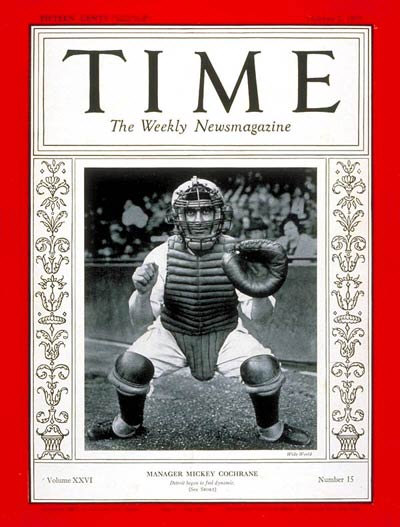
Cochrane

- Detroit Tigers manager and star player Mickey Cochrane, who had been the American League MVP in 1928 and 1934, suffered a career-ending, near-fatal injury when he was hit by a beanball pitched by Bump Hadley of the New York Yankees. He would be enshrined in the Baseball Hall of Fame in 1947.
- The Exposition Internationale des Arts et Techniques dans la Vie Moderne (International Exposition dedicated to Art and Technology in Modern Life) opened in Paris.
- An editorial in Mussolini's Il Popolo d'Italia warned the Jews of Italy to cease making criticisms of Germany, because such opposition was "irreconcilable with the friendship that binds us to Germany and which has objectives far more vast and fundamental than the Jewish question."
- Born: Mark Shields, American journalist and political commentator; in Weymouth, Massachusetts (d. 2022)
- Died: Henry Ossawa Tanner, 77, African-American artist

== May 26, 1937 (Wednesday) ==
- At Fort Monmouth, New Jersey, the SCR-268 radar, the first radar system to be put into regular use, was demonstrated to the U.S. Secretary of War by director Colonel William R. Blair and engineers of the Signal Corps Laboratories of the U.S. Army Signal Corps.
- Elections were held in the Netherlands for all 100 seats of the Tweede Kamer. The Anti-Revolutionaire Partij (ARP) of Prime Minister Hendrikus Colijn won only 17 seats, but his coalition government with the Roomsch-Katholieke Staatspartij (RKSP) and the Christelijk-Historische Unie remained in control.
- The Little Steel strike began in the United States as 85,000 steelworkers in five states walked out from their jobs with the smaller steel companies (Republic Steel, Inland Steel, and Youngstown Sheet and Tube Company). While an earlier strike against "Big Steel" (U.S. Steel and Bethlehem Steel) had been organized by the United Mine Workers of America, the walkout from the smaller companies was called by the Steel Workers Organizing Committee (SWOC) of the Congress of Industrial Organizations (CIO).

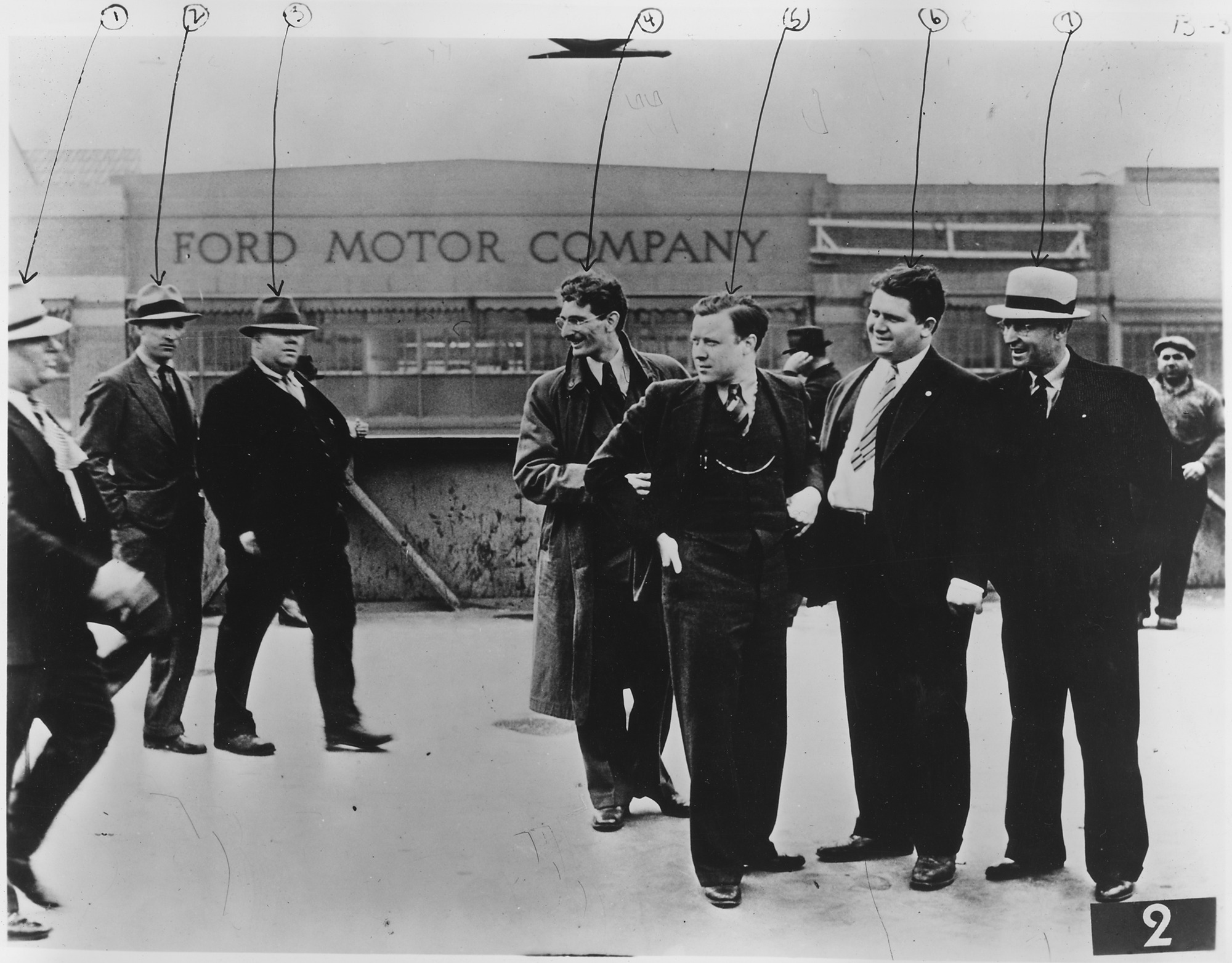
Ford company security approaches the UAW leaders

- Strikebreakers at the Ford Motor Company attacked strike leaders who were members of the 174, the local chapter of the United Auto Workers (UAW). The strikers were handing out leaflets on a pedestrian overpass that led to the front gates of the auto factory at the Ford River Rouge complex in Dearborn, Michigan. Several of the leading UAW union organizers, including Walter Reuther and Richard Frankensteen, were asked by a Detroit News photographer, Scotty Kilpatrick, to pose for a picture on the overpass, with the Ford sign in the background. While they were posing, men from Ford's Service Department came from behind and beat them.

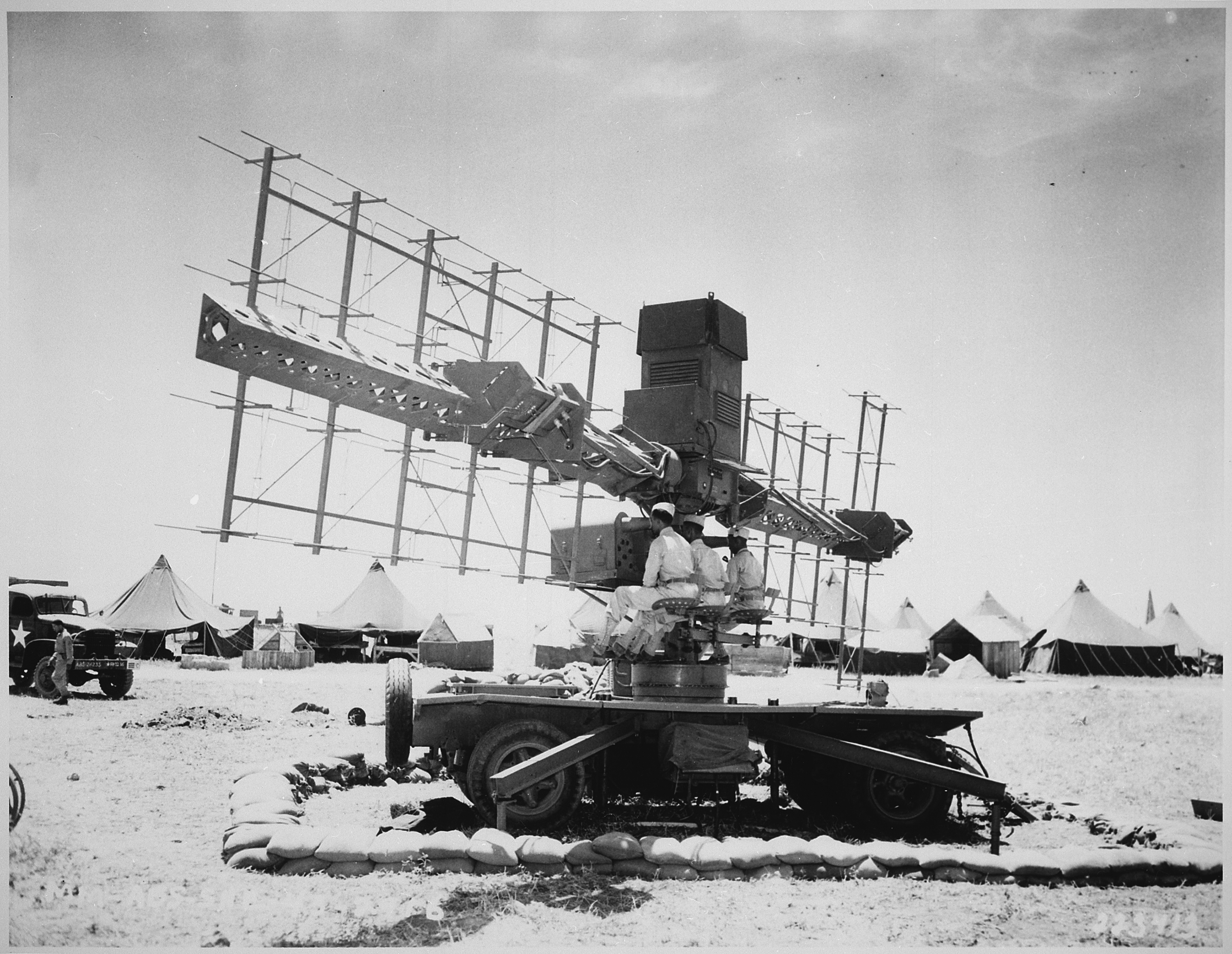
The innovative SCR-268 radar

- The London bus strike ended as 25,000 striking union members agreed to a May 3 return to work.
- Egypt became the 63rd and last country to join the League of Nations. Before Egypt's admission, eight members nations had withdrawn, and 11 more would leave afterward.
- Iran and Turkey came to a final agreement on the location of their common boundaries, accepting the demarcation of the border between them by an agreement signed at Tehran.
- The boxing film Kid Galahad starring Edward G. Robinson, Bette Davis, Humphrey Bogart, and newcomer Wayne Morris in the title role was released.
- Died:
  - Alexander Slepkov, 37, Soviet Russian journalist known for his opposition to collective farming and his collaboration with Martemyan Ryutin in the "'Ryutin-Slepkov Group'", was executed after being convicted of conspiracy in the 1936 assassination of Sergei Kirov.
  - Bertha May Crawford, 50, Canadian coloratura soprano, opera singer and prima donna, died of pneumonia.
  - Lang Campbell, American book illustrator for the Uncle Wiggily series of children's books

== May 27, 1937 (Thursday) ==
Opening of the Golden Gate Bridge

- The Golden Gate Bridge opened in San Francisco.
- The Gestapo ordered 200 German Catholic newspapers to shut down for publishing articles critical of Nazi institutions.
- The Minseito and Seiyukai parties jointly demanded the Japanese cabinet's resignation.
- Born:
  - Sérgio Cabral, Brazilian composer; in Cascadura, Rio de Janeiro (d.2024)
  - Finis Jhung, American ballet dancer and founder of Chamber Ballet USA; in Honolulu, Hawaii Territory

== May 28, 1937 (Friday) ==
- The Nazi German government incorporated the Gesellschaft zur Vorbereitung des Deutschen Volkswagens mbH (Limited Liability Company for the preparation of the German People's Car), abbreviated as Gezuvor, to create an affordable automobile, dubbed the "People's Car"— in German, called the Volkswagen. A project of Adolf Hitler's "Kraft durch Freude" ("strength through joy") program, the Volkswagen was manufactured starting in 1939 at a plant in Fallersleben in Lower Saxony, and used forced labor during World War II from 20,000 imprisoned people, drawn from concentration camps and prisoner of war camps.
- Neville Chamberlain, Chancellor of the Exchequer in the cabinet of retiring Prime Minister of the United Kingdom Stanley Baldwin, was formally appointed by King George VI as the new government leader. Baldwin was ennobled as Earl Baldwin of Bewdley, and entered the House of Lords.
- In the final act of the Baldwin government, The London Gazette announced that Wallis Warfield would not be elevated to royal status upon her marriage to the Duke of Windsor, and would only be entitled to be addressed in the forms appropriate to a woman who was married to a duke but was not of royal blood. The ruling also applied to any children she might have with the Duke.
- In the Soviet Union, in the course of the "Great Terror" campaign, a mass arrest was made in a single day of at least nine prominent citizens who had fallen out of favor with Premier Joseph Stalin. All arrested and imprisoned were executed over the next nine months —Iona Yakir (June 12), Igor Terentiev (June 17), Semyon Firin (August 14), Artur Artuzov (August 21), Gaspar Voskanyan (September 20), Nathan Schneersohn (October 9), Nikolai Klyuev (October 25), Sergei Petrenko-Lunev (December 9)Nikolai Kuzmin (February 8), and Romuald Muklevich (February 9).
- Born: Robert Chrisman, American poet, scholar and publisher; in Yuma, Arizona (d. 2013)
- Died:
  - Alfred Adler, 67, Austrian medical doctor and psychotherapist, creator of the practice of individual psychology and the concept of the "inferiority complex", died of a heart attack while walking on a street in Aberdeen in Scotland.
  - William Dornan, 44, Scottish footballer whose career in the Scottish League spanned 28 seasons and 499 games, was killed in a work accident.

== May 29, 1937 (Saturday) ==
- In the Spanish Civil War, 31 German sailors were killed and 74 wounded in the bombing of the German cruiser Deutschland by two Tupolev SB bombers. Although the aircraft were from the Spanish Republican Air Force, both were flown by Soviet Red Air Force pilots.
- In Dutch Guiana, trade union activist Louis Doedel was ordered arrested by colonial Governor Johannes Kielstra, and committed to a psychiatric hospital for observation. Doedel, 31 years old when he was committed, would be held for the next 43 years, finally being released at the end of 1979, ten days before his death.
- Several Hong Kong Chinese newspapers published an identical leading article, appealing to Britain not to enter into negotiations with Japan. The article stated that China would maintain her sovereignty at all costs.
- Born:
  - Hibari Misora (stage name for Kazue Katō), popular Japanese singer whose music has sold more than 100,000,000 recordings; in Yokohama (d.1989)
  - George Zweig, Russian-born American physicist and Los Alamos National Laboratory research scientist who independently discovered the quark model of subatomic particles; in Moscow.
- Died: Lucjan Böttcher, 65, Polish mathematician known for Böttcher's equation.

== May 30, 1937 (Sunday) ==
- More than 200 people were killed when the steamship MV Ciudad de Barcelona, carrying volunteers of the International Brigades to participate in the Spanish Civil War, was torpedoed and sunk by the Spanish Nationalist submarine General Sanjurjo off the coast of Malgrat de Mar. Contemporary sources placed the death toll at 50 or more.
- The "Memorial Day massacre" took place in Chicago as the police fired on a parade of United Steel Workers members and their families, killing 10 people and injuring 40 others, outside of the Republic Steel plant. Another 100 were clubbed by police, 28 of whom suffered serious head injuries.
- Rabaul, the capital of the Territory of New Guinea, was evacuated in advance of the threatened eruption of the Tavurvur volcano. Among the ships assisting in the rescue was the liner SS Golden Bear, which picked up around 750 civilians.

== May 31, 1937 (Monday) ==
- The Admiral Scheer and four German destroyers bombarded the Spanish city of Almería in retaliation for the Deutschland incident, killing 19 people, wounding 50 others and destroying 35 buildings.
- Wilbur Shaw won the Indianapolis 500, finishing two seconds ahead of Ralph Hepburn, the closest finish up to that time, and standing as a record until 1982. During
- Senjūrō Hayashi resigned as Prime Minister of Japan.
- The Spanish Republicans launched the Segovia Offensive against the city of Segovia in an attempt to divert the rebel Spanish Nationalists from their advance on Bilbao. The attempt at luring the Nationalists away failed.
- Italy and Germany decided to withdraw from the non-intervention cordon around Spain.
- Born: Louis Hayes, American jazz drummer; in Detroit
- Died: General Yan Gamarnik, 42, Soviet military commander, shot himself to death immediately after being informed that he was being dismissed from the Soviet Red Army and would soon be arrested.
