= 149th Brigade =

149th Brigade may refer to:

- 149th Mixed Brigade, Spain
- 149th (Northumberland) Brigade, United Kingdom
- 149th Maneuver Enhancement Brigade, United States

== See also ==
- 149th Division (disambiguation)
- 149th Regiment (disambiguation)
