= 16th Division (Spain) =

- 16.ª División
- Active: March 13, 1937–February 1939
- Country: Spain
- Allegiance: (Second Spanish Republic) Republican faction
- Branch: Spanish Republican Army
- Type: Infantry
- Size: Division
- Engagements: Spanish Civil War: Aragon Offensive; Battle of Lleida; Battle of the Ebro; Battle of the Segre

Commanders
- Notable commanders: Manuel Mora Torres

The 16th Division was one of the divisions of the Spanish Republican Army that were organized during the Spanish Civil War on the basis of the Mixed Brigades. It had an outstanding participation in the Battle of the Ebro.

== History ==
The division was created on March 13, 1937, formed by the 23rd, 66th and 77th mixed brigades; its first commander was Ernesto Güemes Ramos. Initially assigned to the IV Army Corps, in May 1937 it became part of the III Army Corps, on the Madrid front. For several months the division was stationed there, limiting itself to garrison work and not intervening in relevant military operations.

In the spring of 1938, when the Aragon Offensive took place, the division was sent to try to reinforce the republican defenses. Meanwhile, its 24th Mixed Brigade took part in the Battle of Lleida, in support of the 46th Division. Months later, the 23rd Mixed Brigade participated in the Balaguer Offensive.

=== Battle of the Ebro ===
Subsequently, the division was assigned to the XII Army Corps, in the Battle of the Ebro. The anarchist Manuel Mora Torres assumed command of the unit. On July 28, the 16th Division crossed the river, heading towards Gandesa in support of the republican units that were already deployed there. The division was later located in the central sector of the Republican zone, under the command of Pedro Mateo Merino. Along with the 35th Division and members of the 46th Division - reinforced with armored forces - it participated in the Republican assaults against Gandesa, which resulted in failure. At the beginning of August it was assigned to the XV Army Corps of Manuel Tagüeña. On August 22, a nationalist attack against the 16th Division's positions caused their disbandment, including the commander of the unit, who was promptly fired. (Note: Manuel Mora was unaccounted for, for several hours, until he reported to the command post of the 124th Mixed Brigade and communicated [falsely] to Juan Modesto that the nationalist advance had already reached the Ebro river. Mora was abruptly dismissed and replaced by Sebastián Zamora Medina.) A day before, the largest of the Mora militias signed an order that read: "Whoever leaves their post, they will suffer and the just punishment to which they are creditors will be applied, in whose application this Command will be inflexible."

=== Front of the Segre ===
Later the division returned to the rear. In November, it participated in the failed Serós offensive together with troops from the 34th Division. At the beginning of the Catalonia Offensive the division had a poor performance, giving up its positions in the Battle of the Segre. According to Jorge Martínez Reverte, at that time the unit was very demoralized. During the rest of the battle for Catalonia, the 16th Division played an irrelevant role.

== Command ==
Commanders

- Ernesto Güemes Ramos;
- Domingo Benages Sacristán;
- Manuel Fresno Urzáiz;
- Manuel Mora Torres;
- Sebastián Zamora Medina;

Commissars

- Ernesto Antuña García, of the PSOE;

Chiefs of Staff

- Manuel Pérez Cabello;

== Order of battle ==
Date	Attached Army Corps	Integrated Mixed Brigades	Battle front
May–June 1937	III Army Corps	23rd, 66th and 77th	Center
December 1937	III Army Corps	23rd, 66th, 77th and 1st Cavalry Brigade	Center
June–July 1938	XII Army Corps	23rd, 24th and 149th	Reservation
August 1938	XV Army Corps	23rd, 24th and 149th	Ebro

== Bibliography ==
- Alpert, Michael (1989). El Ejército republicano en la guerra civil (in Spanish). Siglo XXI Editores.
- Álvarez, Santiago (1989). Los comisarios políticos en el Ejército Popular de la República (in Spanish). Ediciós do Castro.
- Besolí, Andreu; Sesalí, David; Hernández, Xavier; Íñiguez, David; Luque, Joan Carles (2005). Ebro 1938 (in Spanish). Barcelona: Inedita Editores. ISBN 84-96364-27-5.
- Cabrera Castillo, Francisco (2002). Del Ebro a Gandesa. La batalla del Ebro, julio-noviembre 1938 (in Spanish). Almena.
- Corral, Pedro (2007). Desertores. La Guerra Civil que nadie quiere contar (in Spanish). DeBolsillo. ISBN 978-84-8346-258-4.
- Engel, Carlos (1999). Historia de las Brigadas mixtas del Ejército Popular de la República (in Spanish). Madrid: Almena. ISBN 84-922644-7-0.
- Martínez Bande, José Manuel (1978). La Batalla del Ebro (in Spanish). Madrid: San Martín.
- Martínez Bande, José Manuel (1981). La batalla de Pozoblanco y el cierre de la bolsa de Mérida (in Spanish). Madrid: San Martín.
- Martínez Reverte, Jorge (2006). La caída de Cataluña (in Spanish). Barcelona: Crítica.
- Salas Larrazábal, Ramón (2006). Historia del Ejército Popular de la República (in Spanish). La Esfera de los Libros. ISBN 84-9734-465-0.
- Zaragoza, Cristóbal (1983). Ejército Popular y Militares de la República, 1936-1939 (in Spanish). Barcelona: Ed. Planeta.
