= Manuel Mora Torres =

Spanish anarchist (1913–2005)

- Born: 1913; Carmona, Andalusia, Spain
- Died: 2005 (aged 91–92)
- Military career
- Allegiance: CNT
- Service: Confederal militias (1936-1937), Spanish Republican Army (1937-1939)
- Service years: 1936-1939
- Unit: 16th Division
- Conflicts: Spanish Civil War: Battle of the Ebro

Manuel Mora Torres (1913-2005) was an Andalusian anarchist, trade unionist and militant.

== Biography ==
Born in Carmona in 1913, he was a member of the CNT. He participated in the Confederal Congress of Zaragoza, in 1936.

After the outbreak of the Spanish Civil War he joined the confederal militias and, later, the Spanish Republican Army. In July 1938, in the face of the Ebro Offensive, Mora was appointed commander of the 16th Division of the XII Army Corps. On 27 July, the division crossed the Ebro, participating in the fighting against Villalba de los Arcos.

On 22 August, a nationalist attack against the 16th Division positions caused their disbandment, including its commander. (Note: Paradoxically, the day before Mora had signed an order that read: "Whoever abandons his post, will suffer and be applied the just punishment to which they are creditors, in whose application this Command will be inflexible".) Manuel Mora was unaccounted for several hours, until he reported to the command post of the 124th Mixed Brigade and communicated (falsely) to Juan Modesto that the nationalist advance had already reached the Ebro river. Mora was instantly dismissed and replaced by Sebastián Zamora Medina.

After the end of the conflict, he went into exile, passing through France and Venezuela - where he arrived in 1946.

== Bibliography ==
- Cabrera Castillo, Francisco (2002). Del Ebro a Gandesa. La batalla del Ebro, julio-noviembre 1938 (in Spanish). Almena.
- Corral, Pedro (2007). Desertores. La Guerra Civil que nadie quiere contar (in Spanish). DeBolsillo. ISBN 978-84-8346-258-4.
- Martínez Bande, José Manuel (1978). La Batalla del Ebro (in Spanish). Madrid: San Martín.
- Sanz, Víctor (1995). El exilio español en Venezuela (in Spanish). Casa de España.
