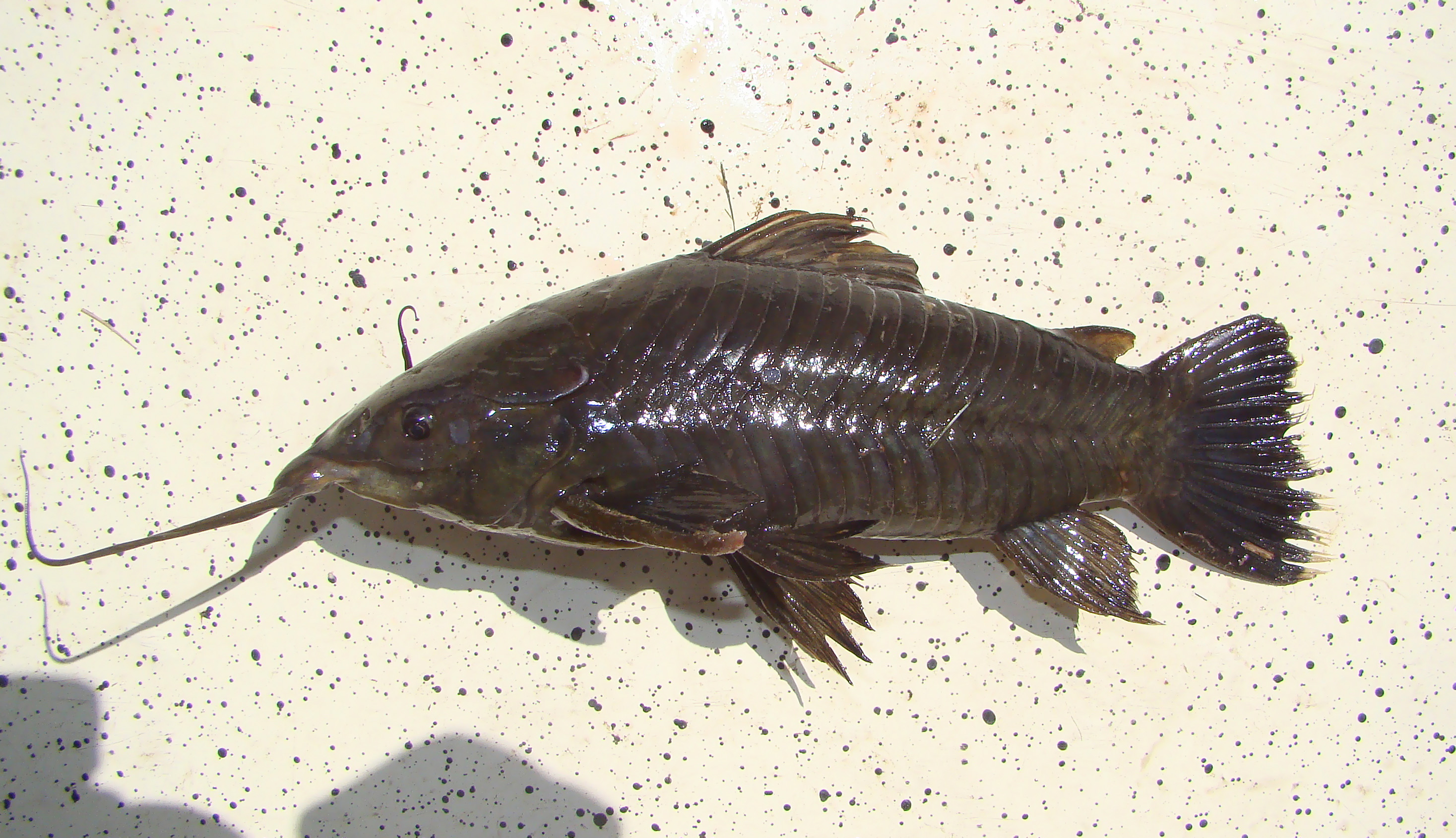

Conservation status
- Least Concern (IUCN 3.1)

Scientific classification
- Kingdom: Animalia
- Phylum: Chordata
- Class: Actinopterygii
- Order: Siluriformes
- Family: Callichthyidae
- Genus: Hoplosternum
- Species: H. littorale

Binomial name
- Hoplosternum littorale (Hancock, 1828)

Synonyms
- Callichthys littoralis Hancock, 1828; Callichthys laevigatus Valenciennes, 1834; Callichthys subulatus Valenciennes, 1840; Callichthys albidus Valenciennes, 1840; Callichthys chiquitos Castelnau, 1855; Hoplosternum stevardii Gill, 1858; Callichthys melampterus Cope, 1872; Hoplosternum schreineri A. Miranda-Ribeiro, 1911; Cascadura maculocephala Ellis, 1913; Hoplosternum shirui Fowler, 1940; Hoplosternum littorale daillyi Hoedeman, 1952; Hoplosternum thoracatum cayennae Hoedeman, 1961

= Hoplosternum littorale =

Species of fish

Hoplosternum littorale is a species of freshwater ray-finned fish belonging to the subfamily Callichthyinae of the family Callichthyidae, the armoured catfishes. It is known as Tamatá in Brazil, atipa in French Guiana, hassa in Guyana, kwi kwi (or kwie kwie) in Suriname, cascadu or cascadura in Trinidad and Tobago, and busco or currito in Venezuela.

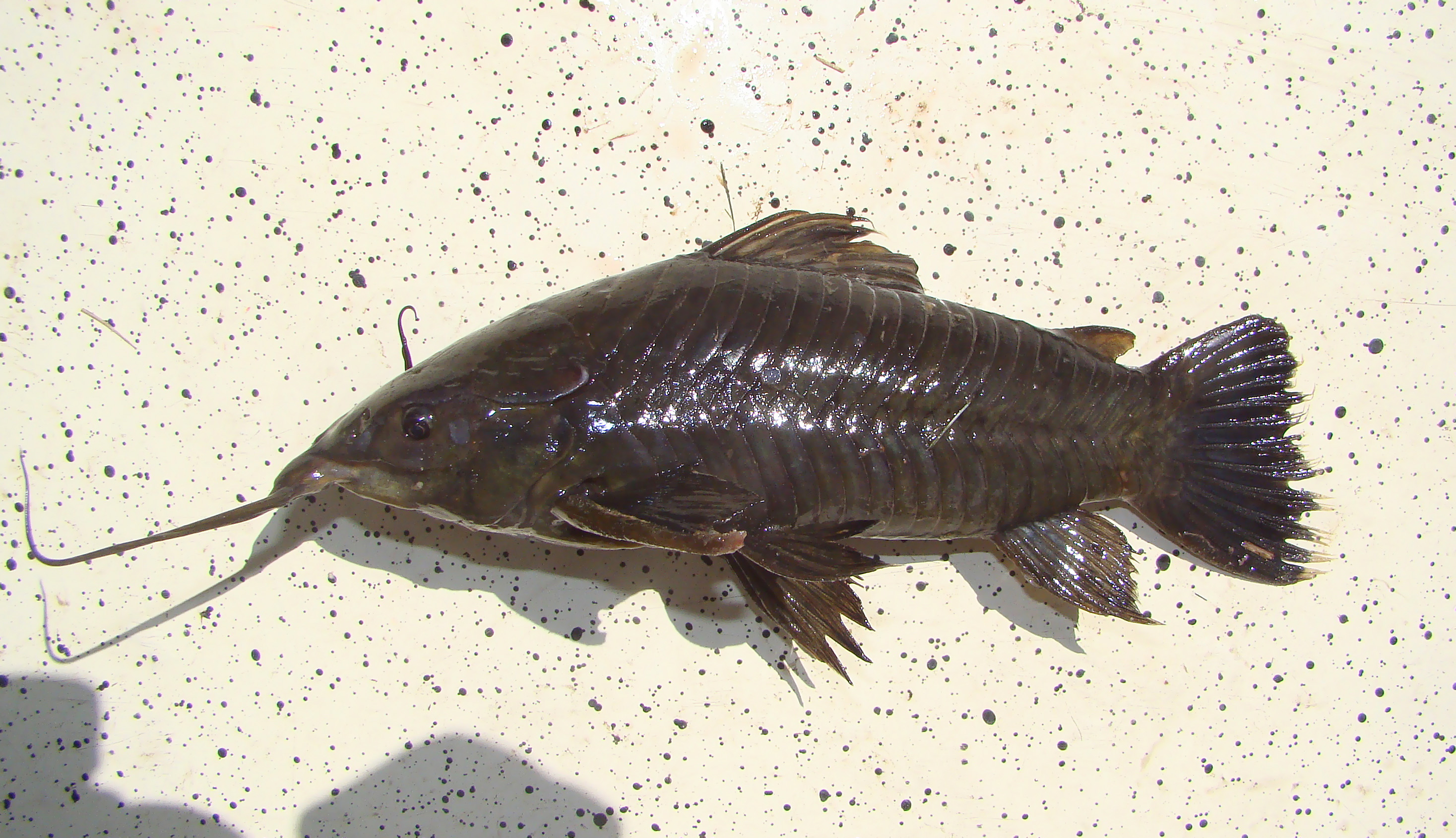
Hoplosternum littorale

== Description ==
H. littorale is armor-plated and dorso-ventrally compressed. The fish will grow in length up to 24.0 centimetres (9.4 in) TL.

Males grow to a larger average and maximum size than females and, during the reproductive season, develop fat deposits in the pectoral fin and an elongated recurved pectoral spine that often assumes a reddish colour. Males with recurved pectoral spines are not found outside of the reproductive period.

== Distribution ==
H. littorale has the widest distribution of any callichthyid. It is present in all of South America east of the Andes and north of Buenos Aires, including the Orinoco, Trinidad, coastal rivers of the Guianas, Amazon River drainage, Paraguay, lower Paraná River, and coastal systems in southern Brazil. It ranges from Venezuela and Guyanas to Argentina.

One single lot is known from the upper Paraná River and the São Francisco River drainage; it has been suggested that these occurrences may represent introduced populations. This species has also been introduced into the Indian River Lagoon of Florida.

== Ecology ==
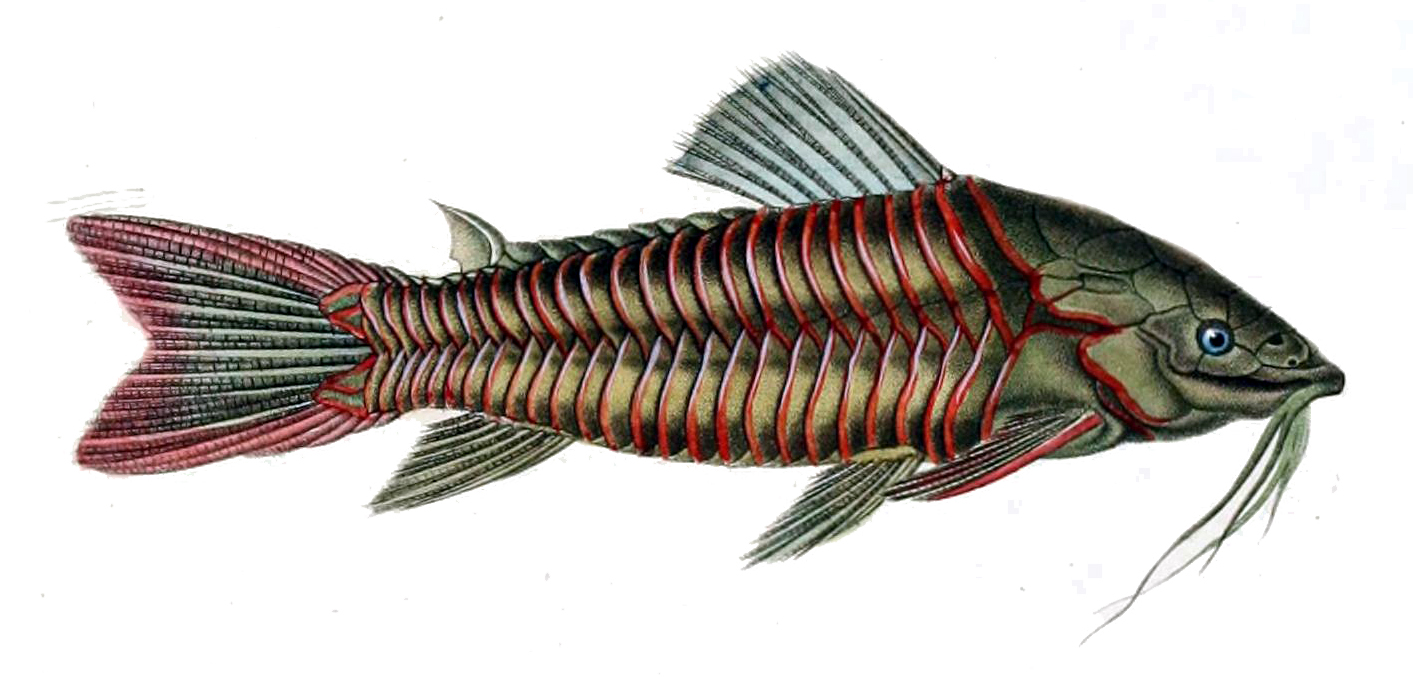
Hoplosternum littorale

Most activity of non-breeding H. littorale such as feeding and locomotor activity are mainly nocturnal. It has a maximum reported age of 4 years. The diet of H. littorale consists mainly of benthic invertebrates and detritus.

H. littorale natively inhabits tropical standing waters or swamps. It is not found in rainforest creeks and clearwater rivers draining Precambrian Guyana and Brazilian Shields, where water is extremely poor in dissolved minerals. This species is restricted to swamps of tropical and subtropical South America and the floodplains of Amazonian whitewater rivers originating in the Andes. Such environments are characterized by low levels of dissolved oxygen and markedly seasonal conditions caused primarily by fluctuations in rainfall.

H. littorale can breathe both with gills and through its intestines. However, intestinal respiration is not exhibited upon hatching, and the development of the respiratory intestine occurs throughout the juvenile period (up to 32 days old). Newly hatched larvae do not have the ability to breathe air through their intestines; however, it is possible that they absorb oxygen through their skin at this point, before the armor plates have developed. Soon after, between about 12–23 days of age, young have the capacity to breathe air, but their respiratory intestine has not finished developing. The respiratory intestine is well-developed between days 24 and 32.

H. littorale has two types of hemoglobin, anodic and cathodic; anodic hemoglobin has a relatively low oxygen affinity and has marked Bohr effects, while cathodic hemoglobin lack significant pH effects. In H. littorale, cathodic hemoglobin has a pronounced reversed Bohr effect in which oxygen affinity increases with decreased pH. Cathodic hemoglobin has the purpose of safeguarding oxygen transport to tissues under hypoxic and acidotic conditions.

H. littorale diet varies by age. Immature fish feed primarily on small aquatic crustaceans, especially Cladocera, Ostracoda, Copepoda, and Eubranchipoda. Chironomid larvae are important items in the diets of both juveniles and adults. The adult diet is dominated by mixed detritus, terrestrial insects, microcrustaceans, and aquatic beetles during the dry season, and mixed detritus and chironomid larvae during the wet season.

== Reproduction ==
The first reproduction occurs after one year. Spawning is triggered by the first rains and occurs in the warm and rainy season. As a callichthyine, it builds a bubble nest; among callichthyines, this species is reported to have the most complex nest structure. This dome-shaped nest is rich with oxygen; in the hypoxic water conditions of tropical swamps, the main function of the bubble nest appears to be to provide oxygen to the developing eggs by lifting the eggs above the water surface while protecting them from desiccation. It may also serve to protect the brood against predators, regulate temperature, identify the center of the male's territory, and to synchronize reproductive activities. Nest-building activities usually lasted from 1,000 to 1,500 hours, but only on clear and warm days, particularly during the hottest hours. These activities are also reported to occur at night. Most nests are built in newly flooded swamps, especially in open water in the peripheral area of the swamp. A minimum distance of 10 metres between nests is observed. The nest is the centre of a territory that is vigorously defended by the male, using its enlarged pectoral spines. The diameter and height of the nest average 30 and 6 cm (12 and 2.36 in), respectively.

The beginning of nest building is preceded by a courtship ritual. This pair formation consists of the male and female swimming parallel to each other, the male and female facing each other and contacting their barbels, the male stimulating the flanks of the female, the swimming to the surface by the male and female and production of the first bubbles at the nest site, and adding further bubbles to the nest under construction. The male produces most of the foam. First, the male and female come to the surface and swim belly-up in small circles. The film of the air-water interface is swallowed and pumped out through the gills, where it gains mucus. Movement of the pelvic fins stirs the water and mucus, captures air bubbles, and breaks these air bubbles into a foam. The female may add some bubbles to the nest under construction. Pelvic fin movement differs between sexes; males move their pelvic fins in a side-to-side fashion, while females open and close their pelvic fins. The male often dives to the bottom to retrieve plant debris; filamentous nest materials are preferred, which are knitted together in the nest by the male. The male creates an upward water current with its tail fin that lift plant materials up. Then, the male uses its developed pectoral fin spines to cary the plant materials to the nest. The male uses its mouth and pectoral fins to incorporate the plant material into the foam mass of the nest. Females neither have developed pectoral fin spines nor do they help in transporting plant debris. The result is a dome-shaped nest made up of loosely interwoven plant material on top of tightly interwoven plant material, held up to the surface with a layer of foam; the eggs will be laid on top of this foam from below.

Spawning occurs during the daytime. There is indication that the female drinks the sperm and that fertilization takes place after the sperm has passed through her digestive tract. The male and female form the "T-position", where the female places its mouth over the male's genital opening and collects the sperm in the mouth. The female rests at the bottom for 30–60 seconds, and then swims to the nest, turns upside down, and lays the eggs in the nest. H. littorale is a multiple spawner. Investing in reproduction is high in females since they can spawn up to 14 times during a 7-month breeding season and each spawn consists of 6,000–9,000 eggs. On average, two to four females spawn simultaneously, resulting in an average number of 20,000 eggs per nest. The adhesive eggs are located in the centre of the nest under the plant debris above the surface of the water, and not in contact with the oxygen-depleted swamp water. The male guards the nest during incubation; incubation of the eggs takes two to three days depending on the temperature in the nest. The male also regularly supplies foam to the nest. Guarding and maintenance of the nest occurs day and night. Once spawning has been completed, the male attacks females that have deposited their eggs in the nest. Despite intense predation pressure on eggs and larvae, the male's guarding behavior extends for only one or two days after hatching. The male attacks with its large pectoral spines erect; the attack consists of rapid propulsion towards its target followed by a sharp lateral turn, which causes the rough outer edge of pectoral spine to drag across the target and cause abrasion.

== Relationship to humans ==
H. littorale is a valuable resource extensively fished in the deltas of the Amazon and Orinoco. In Guyana, French Guiana, Suriname, and Trinidad, this species is an extremely popular food fish.

H. littorale is commercially cultured in Trinidad, Guyana and Suriname. It fetched a price of US$8/kg in 2001 and there are local and foreign ethnic markets for the fish.

H. littorale is also an aquarium fish.
