= George Edward Pendray =

American journalist, rocketeer

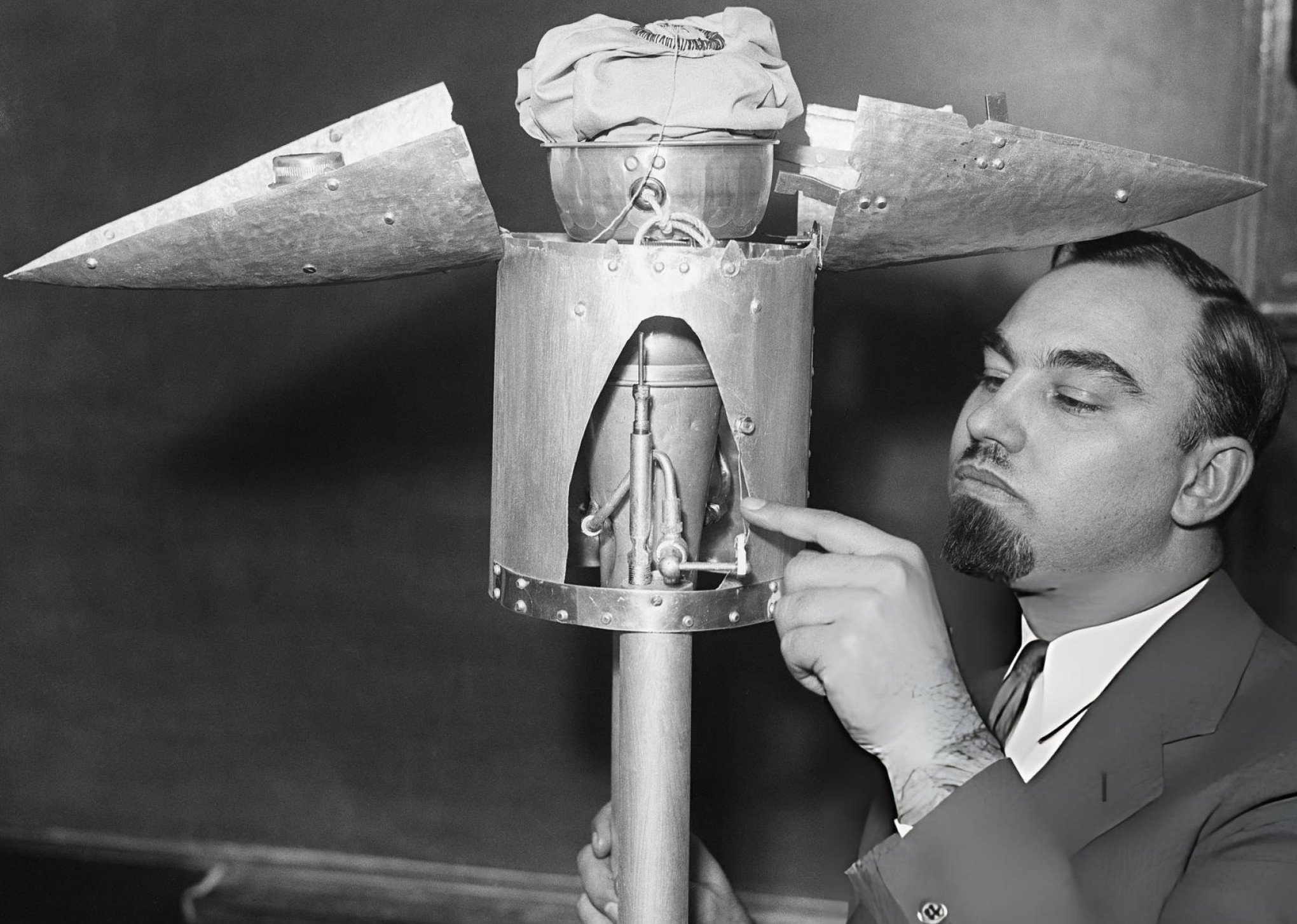
- Pendray with a rocket fueling device in 1932
- Born: May 19, 1901; Omaha, Nebraska
- Died: September 15, 1987 (aged 86); Cranbury, New Jersey
- Occupations: Public relations counsel; author; rocketeer; business executive
- Known for: Public relations, "time capsule"
- Spouse: Leatrice M. Gregory
- Children: 3

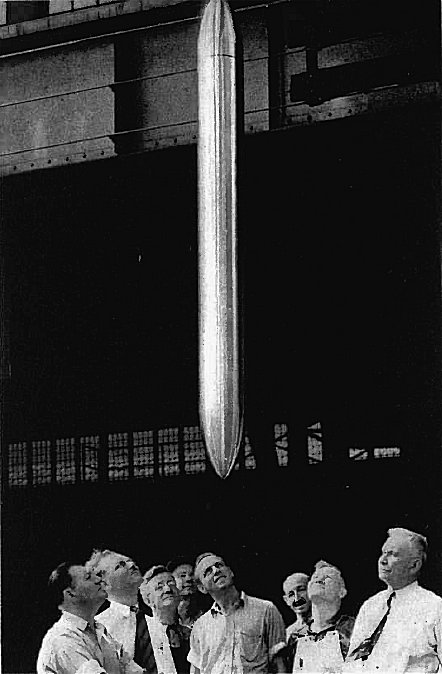
Westinghouse "time capsule" (1939)

George Edward Pendray (May 19, 1901 – September 15, 1987) was an American public relations counselor, author, foundation executive, and founder of the American Interplanetary Society.

== Personal life ==
Leatrice May Gregory, Pendray's first wife, was his partner in Pendray & Company.

A resident of Jamesburg, New Jersey, Pendray died in Cranbury, New Jersey in 1987 at the age of 86.

== Work ==
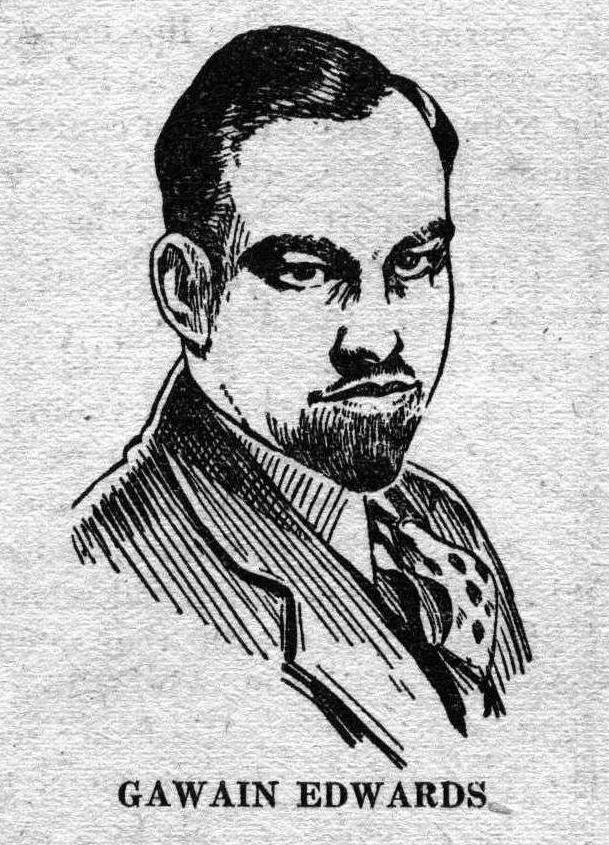
"Gawain Edwards" as depicted in Wonder Stories in 1931

Pendray sometimes used the pen name "Gawain Edwards"; however, he usually wrote under his own name. He wrote articles and fiction for many magazines. Amazing Stories praised Edward's The Earth Tube as "vividly and plausibly written," recommending it "to all lovers of scientific fiction".

- The Earth Tube, 1929
- A Rescue From Jupiter, 1932
- Men, Mirrors and Stars, 1935
- Book of Record of the Time Capsule, 1938
- City Noise, 1940; with Esther Goddard
- The Coming Age of Rocket Power, 1945
- Rocket Development 1948; co-editors Robert Goddard and Esther Goddard
- The Guggenheim Medalists, 1964
- The Papers of Robert H. Goddard, 3 volumes, 1970; co-edited with Esther Goddard
