= Hoplosternum punctatum =

Conservation status
- Near Threatened (IUCN 3.1)

Scientific classification
- Kingdom: Animalia
- Phylum: Chordata
- Class: Actinopterygii
- Order: Siluriformes
- Family: Callichthyidae
- Genus: Hoplosternum
- Species: H. punctatum

Binomial name
- Hoplosternum punctatum Meek & Hildebrand, 1916

Species of fish

Hoplosternum punctatum, the spotted hoplo, is a species of freshwater ray-finned fish belonging to the subfamily Callichthyinae of the family Callichthyidae, the armoured catfishes. This species is only found in the Atrato River basin in Colombia and in the Pacific coastal drainages of Panama, in southern Central America.
