= 149th Mixed Brigade =

- 149.ª Brigada Mixta
- Active: May 1937–February 1939
- Country: Spain
- Allegiance: (Second Spanish Republic) Republican faction
- Branch: Spanish Republican Army
- Type: Infantry
- Size: Brigade
- Engagements: Spanish Civil War

The 149th Mixed Brigade was a unit of the Spanish Republican Army created during the Spanish Civil War. Deployed on the fronts of Madrid, Aragon and Catalonia, the brigade did not play a relevant role in the war.

== History ==
The unit was created in May 1937, on the Madrid front, from one of the battalions of the 75th Mixed Brigade. Command of the unit initially fell (during the training period) to the infantry commander Enrique García Villanueva, who was replaced shortly after by the militia major Santiago Tito Buades; For his part, the chief of staff fell to the infantry captain Juan Bautista Piera Reus. The 149th Mixed Brigade, which was made up of anarchist elements, was assigned to the 6th Division of the II Army Corps. For months the brigade remained located in front of Madrid, without participating in military operations.

In March 1938, after the beginning of the Aragon Offensive, the 149th Mixed Brigade was sent to reinforce the threatened sector. On March 24, however, it lost the town of Velilla de Ebro to enemy pressure and had to retreat. On March 26, it was defending the sector between Fraga and the Ebro river. Briefly added to the subgroup (Note: It was a subgroup, in turn, providing close support to the Autonomous group of the Ebro.) commanded by Lieutenant Colonel Jesús Liberal Travieso, came to participate in the battle of Lleida. With the fall of the city, all its troops crossed to the other side of the Segre River. Later, it was added to the 16th Division of the XII Army Corps.

The brigade came to take part in the Battle of the Ebro. On July 27, it crossed the river, relieving elements of the 35th International Division in the Gandesa sector. On July 31, it was located in front of Villalba de los Arcos, being relieved of this sector on August 3; it was then assigned to cover the entrances to La Fatarella. In mid-August, during one of the nationalist counterattacks, the 149th Mixed Brigade fell back in disorder — despite the fact that the unit was located in the rear. It was later withdrawn from the Ebro front along with the rest of the units of its division and destined for the reserve, being subjected to a reorganization.

In December 1938, at the beginning of the Catalonia Offensive, the 149th Mixed Brigade constituted the reserve for the sector facing Serós. During the enemy attack, the unit abandoned its positions almost without fighting, partly dragged away by the disbandment of the 179th Mixed Brigade. The commander of the unit, militia major Eduardo Pérez Segura, was suddenly dismissed and replaced by the militia major Filemont. The remains of the 149th Mixed Brigade joined the general retreat towards the border.

== Command ==
Commanders

- Infantry Commander Enrique García Villanueva;
- Militia major Santiago Tito Buades;
- Militia major Eduardo Pérez Segura;
- Militia major Filemont;

Commissars

- Francisco Agudo;
- Angel Espolín;
- Mariano Martín Herrero, of the CNT;

== Bibliography ==
- Asenjo, Mariano; Ramos, Victoria (2008). Malagón. Autobiografía de un falsificador (in Spanish). El Viejo Topo.
- Álvarez, Santiago (1989). Los comisarios políticos en el Ejército Popular de la República (in Spanish). Ediciós do Castro.
- Engel, Carlos (1999). Historia de las Brigadas Mixtas del Ejército Popular de la República (in Spanish). Madrid: Almena. ISBN 84-922644-7-0.
- Martínez Bande, José Manuel (1975). La llegada al mar (in Spanish). Madrid: San Martín. ISBN 84-7140-115-0.
- Martínez Bande, José Manuel (1978). La Batalla del Ebro (in Spanish). Madrid: San Martín.
- Martínez Bande, José Manuel (1979). La Campaña de Cataluña (in Spanish). Madrid: San Martín.
