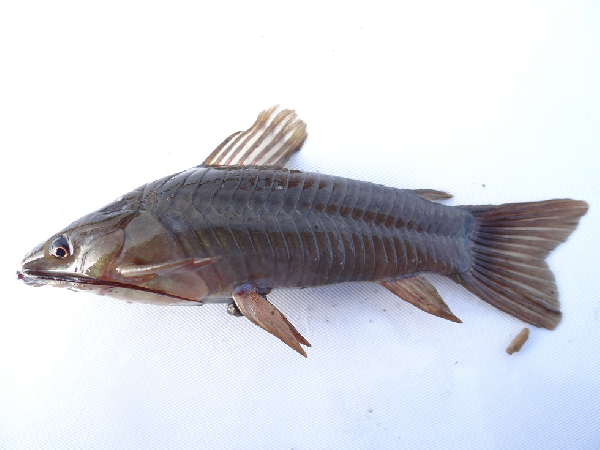

Conservation status
- Least Concern (IUCN 3.1)

Scientific classification
- Kingdom: Animalia
- Phylum: Chordata
- Class: Actinopterygii
- Order: Siluriformes
- Family: Callichthyidae
- Genus: Hoplosternum
- Species: H. magdalenae

Binomial name
- Hoplosternum magdalenae C. H. Eigenmann, 1913

= Hoplosternum magdalenae =

Species of fish

Hoplosternum magdalenae, the striped hoplo, is a species of freshwater ray-finned fish belonging to the subfamily Callichthyinae of the family Callichthyidae, the armoured catfishes. It is found west of the Andes, in the drainages of Sinu River and Magdalena River in Colombia.
