= ARS (rocket family) =

The ARS rocket family was a series of rockets developed by the American Interplanetary Society — later the American Rocket Society — during the 1930s. Based on the German Verein für Raumschiffahrt's (VfR) Mirak rocket, it used a liquid-fueled rocket engine, powered by liquid oxygen and gasoline propellants. The first successful launch, of the ARS-2, took place on May 14, 1933. The design was modified and refined by successive rockets; the last launch of an ARS rocket took place on May 9, 1937.

== Rocket No. 1 ==
Rocket No. 1 was a seven-foot-tall, liquid-oxygen-and-gasoline rocket based on the VfR's Repulsor with an engine just under the nose cone, and two long fuel tanks hanging off the side below. On 12 November 1932 Rocket No. 1 underwent a static fire at a farm near Stockton, New Jersey producing 60 pounds of thrust for 20–30 seconds. The static firing resulted in damage to the rocket, which was ultimately never launched.

== Rocket No. 2 ==
Rocket No. 2 was an improved design of Rocket No. 1 and would be launched at Marine Park at Great Kills, Staten Island on 14 May 1933. Rocket No. 2 reached an altitude of approximately 250 feet before its oxygen tank failed and the rocket fell into the Lower New York Bay where it was recovered by two boys in a rowboat. It would be the first American rocket designed, fabricated, publicly demonstrated, launched, and recovered by an association of volunteers.

== Rocket No. 3 ==
Rocket No. 3 incorporated an experimental concentric propellant tank and unusually long nozzles to investigate cooling and overall efficiency of nozzles. However, the tank would not be adequately filled with liquid oxygen as it boiled away through contact with the warm metal structure. As such the rocket was never launched.

== Rocket No. 4 ==
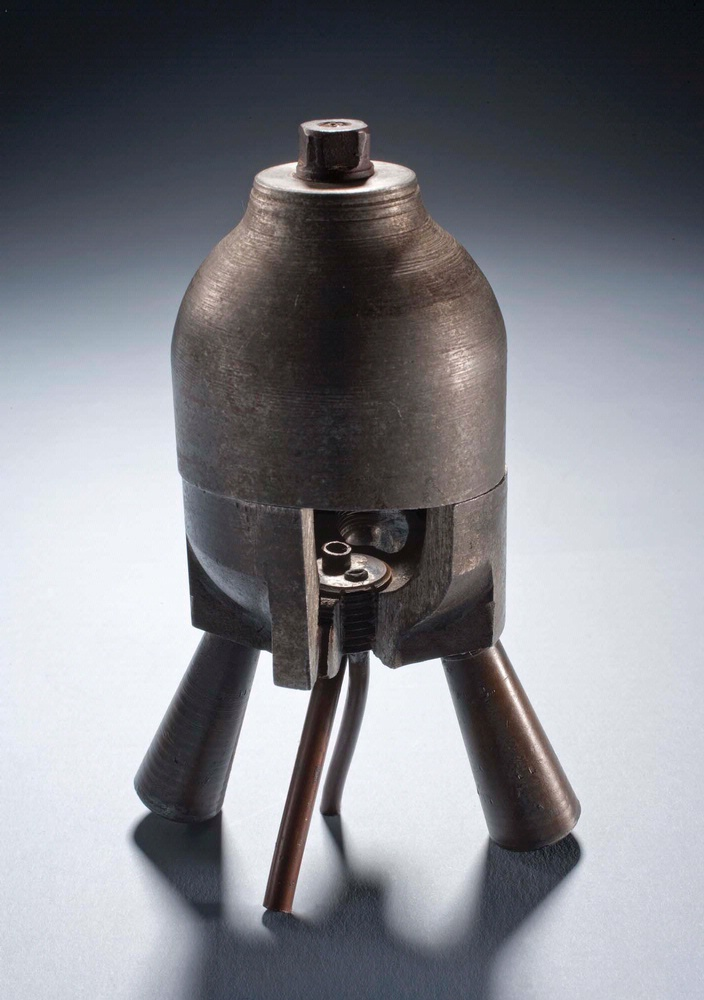
Engine of the ARS-4 rocket

Rocket No. 4 was another experimental design conceived by John Shesta that unlike the rockets designed by the VfR, used a four-nozzle combustion chamber and tandem tanks. Rocket No. 4 would be launched twice, first on 10 June 1934 when the rocket failed due to inadequate fuel flow preventing sufficient thrust and again on 9 September 1934 when the rocket did successfully launch and reached an altitude of 382 feet and a distance of roughly 1,585ft along its flight path. Rocket No. 4's parachutes failed to properly deploy, but regardless, it was viewed as the society's most successful liquid propellant launch.
