= American Rocket Society =

Professional science organization

- Founded: April 4, 1930
- Founder: G. Edward Pendray
- Dissolved: 1963, merged with the Institute of the Aerospace Sciences to become AIAA
- Type: Professional Organization
- Origins: renamed from American Interplanetary Society on 6 April 1934
- Members: 21,000 (1959)

The American Rocket Society was a professional organization founded in 1930 as the American Interplanetary Society by science fiction authors and early spaceflight enthusiasts that merged with the Institute of the Aerospace Sciences to form the American Institute of Aeronautics and Astronautics in 1963.

== History ==
The American Interplanetary Society (AIS) was founded in New York City on 4 April 1930 in the apartment of G. Edward Pendray. Besides Pendray and his wife Leatrice Gregory Pendray, other attendees included: David Lasser, Charles P. Mason, Charles W. Van Devander, Fletcher Pratt, Nathan Schachner, Laurence E. Manning, William Lemkin, Warren Fitzgerald, Adolph L. Fierst, and either Everett Long or Roy A. Giles. Lasser would be named the AIS' first president.

The immediate goal of the AIS was to prove that interplanetary travel is a legitimate long-term scientific and engineering problem, instead of a pure fantasy with the group's first public meeting at the American Museum of Natural History on 30 April 1930. Four days after the AIS was founded Lasser sent a letter to America's premier rocket scientist, Robert Goddard to join, but he declined to attend as he did not want to disclose the technical details of his work, but joined the organization on paper.

In January 1931 French rocket theorist Robert Esnault-Pelterie was scheduled to speak at an AIS event, alongside a screening of Fritz Lang's Frau im Mond, but Esnault-Pelterie became ill shortly before the event, forcing Pendray to substitute as speaker before a crowd of approximately 2,000. Later that year Pendray corresponded with Willy Ley of the German rocket society, Verein für Raumschiffahrt (VfR), and visited him in 1931. During this visit Pendray observed the VfR's experimentation in liquid-propellant, and returned to America determined that the AIS also begin experiments, forming an experimental committee and adopted liquid oxygen and gasoline as its initial propellant.

The members originally conducted their own rocket experiments in New York and New Jersey. The society printed its own journal. The AIS did pioneering work in testing the design requirements of liquid-fueled rockets, with a number of successful test launches of ARS rockets occurring in this period and pointing the way to the United States space program. Its name was changed to American Rocket Society on 6 April 1934. In 1936, the American Rocket Society and its member Alfred Africano were awarded the Prix d'Astronautique by the Société astronomique de France (French Astronomical Society) in recognition of their pioneering tests with liquid fueled rockets.

The Journal of the American Rocket Society was published from 1945–53.

Membership increased rapidly in the 1950s as the government funded "upper air research", and by the end of the decade it had reached 21,000. In early 1963, the ARS merged with the Institute of the Aerospace Sciences to become the American Institute of Aeronautics and Astronautics (AIAA).
