= Percy William Pilcher =

Organist, composer, and British railway photographer

Percy William Pilcher (5 July 1866 – 3 May 1937), ARCO, was an organist, composer, and a railway photographer, who was one of the first in Britain to capture images of moving trains. 250 of his glass plate negatives from the F. Burtt collection are held by the National Railway Museum (NRM) in York, the earliest of which has been dated to around 1881–2. Pilcher sold much of his work to F. Moore's Railway Photographs (later the Locomotive Publishing Company), who published them as uncredited prints and postcards. The corresponding negatives are also now in the possession of the NRM.

== Biography ==
Pilcher was born in Boston, Lincolnshire on 5 July 1866, the son of Margaret (née Westland) and William John Pilcher, FRCS, LRCP. He was educated at Bath College from 1879 to 1884, before moving on to Gonville and Caius College, Cambridge, where he changed subjects from medicine to music. Graduating with a B.A. in 1888 and an M.A. four years later, he studied externally under Frederick Bridge and was appointed to the position of organist at Shrewsbury Abbey in 1892. It is likely that he exerted some influence regarding the design of a new organ the abbey ordered from William Hill & Sons in 1911, but never fully completed. In Shrewsbury, Pilcher is reported to have been on the committee of the local motorcycle club in 1910. He became a member of staff at Shrewsbury School in 1918 and remained there until his retirement in 1935. He died suddenly at his home in the town on 3 May 1937.

Pilcher married Margaret Mowbray Harewood at St Botolph's Church, Boston on 16 April 1895. The couple had four sons, the eldest of whom, Lt. Gerald Aubrey Pilcher (b. 27 February 1896), died at Ypres on 26 October 1917 as a result of wounds received during the Battle of Passchendale. Their second son, Col. Alan Humphrey Pilcher (b. 12 July 1898), served in the British Army during World War I (when he won a Military Cross) and also World War II.

Evidently, Pilcher shared an interest in photography with his brother, Cecil Westland Pilcher, MRCS, LRCP (d. 17 July 1943), who "acquired considerable repute as an artist, photographer and etcher", and was president of the pre-World War I Boston Camera Club.

== Photography ==
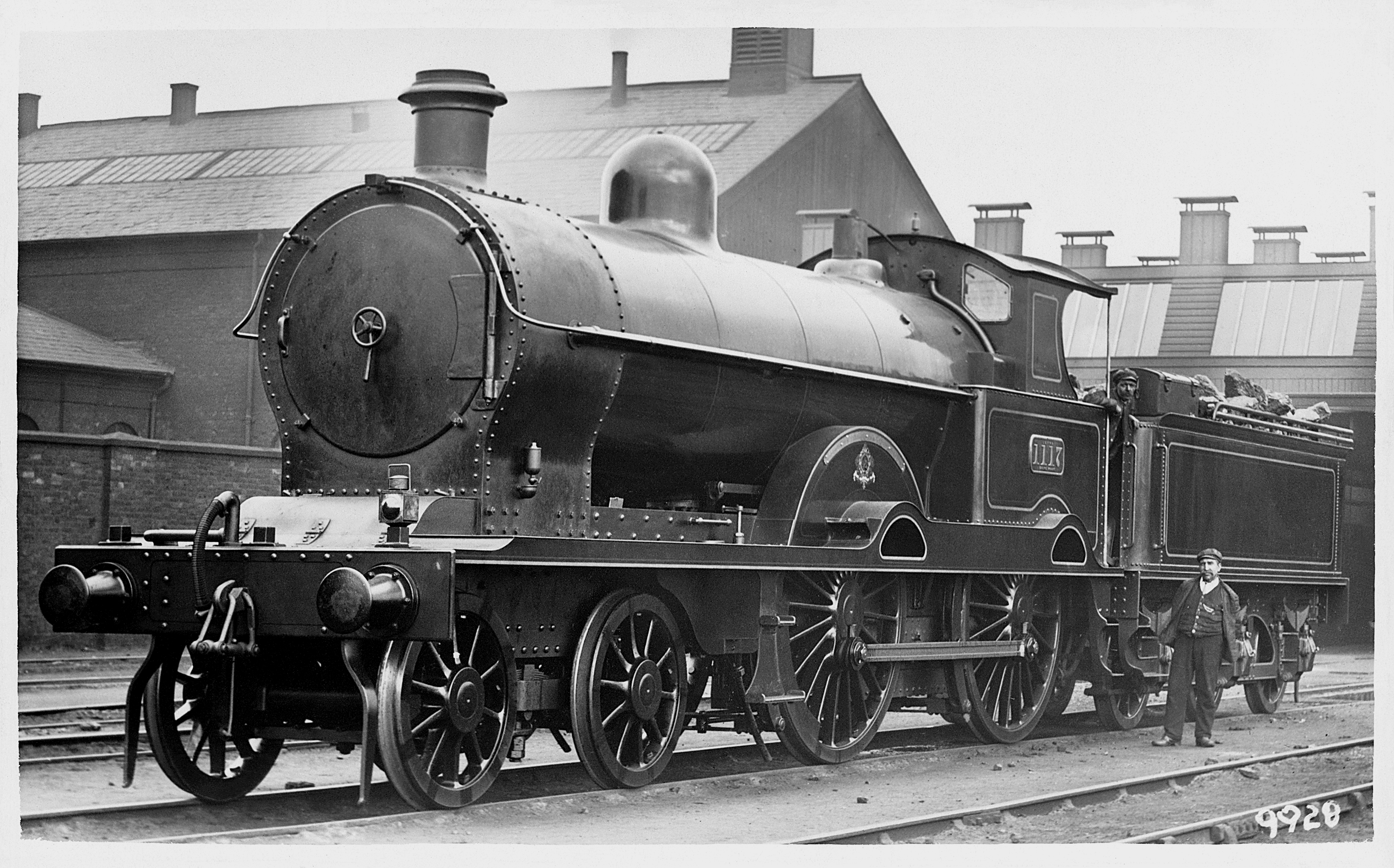
Postcard published by F. Moore from one of Pilcher's glass plate negatives: LNWR Whale Precursor Class locomotive no. 1117 "Vandal" at Shrewsbury engine shed, very soon after being built.

Pilcher's earliest photographs seem to have been taken around 1881–2 in the Boston and Grantham area, and in 1889, whilst a student at Cambridge, advances in the speed of photographic emulsions enabled him to become one of the first people to successfully capture a train in motion (others cited in connection with this feat are Tice F. Budden, Edward J. Bedford, and A. H. Malan). However, the majority of Pilcher's work dates from after his move to Shrewsbury in 1892, when he was presented with the opportunity to photograph an especially diverse selection of rolling stock. In part this was because the town's station was jointly owned by the two largest railway companies in Britain at the time, the Great Western Railway (GWR) and London and North Western Railway (LNWR), but an additional advantage was that both organisations sent their most modern locomotives to Shrewsbury whilst simultaneously consigning those nearing retirement to duties in the area.

From 1896, the publication of illustrated railway magazines provided photographers interested in the subject with a new market for their work, although the standard of reproduction was poor and contributors had little incentive to contemplate "the finer points of their craft". Moreover, the publications involved "were content to publish an interminable series of pictures of trains, taken time after time at some well-known convenient spots, together with the dullest official photographs of locomotives".

A notable event which Pilcher found himself ideally placed to document was the Shrewsbury railway accident of 15 October 1907, when an LNWR passenger and mail train derailled at the junction just to the north of the station, killing 18 people and injuring over 30 more.

Pilcher was a treasurer of the Shropshire Camera Club. At their Annual Invitation Exhibition in 1900, Pilcher showed a set of slides which included a "very fine" portrait of a "North Sea skipper". At the same event in 1903, he sent six slides to be shown, "A Contented Mind" being amongst them.

== Published music ==
Pilcher composed several known, published works for organ, piano, and four-part choir:

=== Organ music ===
- Andante Grazioso (1890) London: Novello, Ewer & Co. (NOV580137).
- Two Preludes (1892) London: Novello, Ewer & Co. (NOV580164).
- Intermezzo (1893) London: E. Donajowski.

An apparently unpublished "scherzo for strings and organ" (c. 1900) is also documented, having been performed by the Shrewsbury Orchestral Society at public concerts on at least two occasions.

=== Piano music ===
- Original Compositions for the Pianoforte. Op. 8. No. 1. Scherzo humoresque. No. 2. Impromptu in E. No. 3. Melody in D flat. Op. 9. No. 1. Tarantelle. No. 2. Nocturne. No. 3. Valse Caprice (1893) London: E. Donajowski.

=== Choral music ===
- Advice to lovers, with words by Sir George Etherege (1892) London: Novello, Ewer & Co. No. 658 from Novello's Part-Song Book, Second Series. A madrigal.

Pilcher also arranged "A Song of the Oar" by F. T. Prior of Shrewsbury School, for solo voice and unison chorus, published by Novello & Co. in 1900.

== See also ==
- The Locomotive Publishing Company
