= Ryszard S. Michalski =

Polish-American computer scientist (1937–2007)

- Born: Ryszard Stanisław Michalski; May 7, 1937; Kalusz
- Died: September 20, 2007 (aged 70); Fairfax
- Education: Silesian University of Technology (Ph.D, 1969); Polytechnic Institute of St. Petersburg (MS, 1961); Universities of Technology, Krakow and Warsaw (BS, 1954–1959)
- Known for: A Father of machine learning The first practical expert system that learned its decision rules from examples (1977); Inferential theory of learning (ITL); Learnable evolution model (LEM); An early successful handwritten alpha-numeric characters recognizing system (1969); Co-founder of Machine Learning (1986)
- Spouse: Elizabeth Marchut-Michalski
- Awards: Officer's Cross of the Order of Merit of the Republic of Poland (2007); Foreign Member of the Polish Academy of Sciences (2000); Fellow of AAAI
- Scientific career
- Fields: Machine learning, Artificial intelligence
- Workplaces: George Mason University (1988–); University of Illinois, Urbana-Champaign (1970–1987); Institute of Automation of Polish Academy of Sciences, Warsaw (1962–1970); Institute of Computer Science of PAS (part time)
- Doctoral students: Hugo de Garis
- Website: www.mli.gmu.edu/michalski/

Ryszard Stanisław Michalski (May 7, 1937 – September 20, 2007) was a Polish-American computer scientist. Michalski was Professor at George Mason University and a pioneer in the field of machine learning.

== Biography ==
Michalski was born in Kalusz near Lvov on 7 May 1937.

He received an equivalent of Bachelor of Science degree in Electrical Engineering at the Universities of Technology in Kraków and Warsaw in 1959; obtained M.S. Computer Science at the Polytechnic Institute of St. Petersburg in 1961; and Ph.D. in Computer Science at the Silesian University of Technology, Gliwice in 1969. In the period 1962–1970 he worked at the Institute of Automation of the Polish Academy of Sciences (PAS) in Warsaw, during which he and Jacek Karpiński developed an early successful learning system for recognizing handwritten alpha-numeric characters.

He emigrated to America in 1970, worked at the University of Illinois at Urbana-Champaign until moved with his research group to the George Mason University in 1988. Although leaving Poland, he worked part-time at the Institute of Computer Science of PAS in Warsaw.

Ryszard S. Michalski died on 20 September 2007 from cancer at his home in Fairfax.

== Academic life ==
Michalski was cofounder of Machine Learning and Inference Laboratory at George Mason University. He earned a patent for the university with Learnable Non-Darwinian Evolution Model (LEM), a form of evolutionary computation, in 2003.

He cofounded the Journal of Machine Learning in 1986 and helped organize the first international multistrategy machine learning conferences in 1991.

=== Work ===
Michalski influenced wide areas, notably in machine learning, but also in the broadly understood areas of data analysis and knowledge discovery. Some of his offspring are listed below. (See more on his homepage at GMU.)

- Learning system for handwritten character recognition (1966)
- AQ algorithm (1969)
- Conceptual clustering (1980)
- Multistrategy learning (1984)
- Logic of human plausible reasoning-with Alan Collins (1979–1989)
- Multistrategy data mining/Knowledge segment (1991)
- Data-driven constructive induction (1991)
- Hypothesis-driven constructive induction (1991)
- Inferential theory of learning (1991)
- Learning trees from rules (1993)
- Natural induction (1996)
- Learnable Evolution Model-LEM (1997)
- Data Inferencing (1998)
- Knowledge Mining (2001)
- Attributional calculus (1998/2004)

== Honors and awards ==
Michalski was elected to Foreign Member of the Polish Academy of Sciences in 2000 and Fellow of AAAI. Poland President honored him with the Officer's Cross of the Order of Merit of the Republic of Poland in July 2007.

== Selected works ==
Michalski was prolific author of scientific works on various topics in computer science, including machine learning, artificial intelligence, and human plausible reasoning. He wrote, co-wrote, or co-edited more than 350 research publications and more than one dozen books. Some of which are listed below. (See more on his homepage at GMU.)

=== Books ===
- 1983. (with Jaime Carbonell & Tom M. Mitchell, Eds.) Machine learning: An artificial intelligence approach. Los Altos, CA: Morgan Kaufmann.
- 1986. (with J.G. Carbonell & Tom Mitchell, Eds.) Machine learning: An artificial intelligence approach. Vol. II. Los Altos, CA: Morgan-Kaufmann.
- 1986. (with Tom Mitchell & J. Carbonell, Eds.) Machine Learning: A Guide to Current Research. Kluwer Academic Publishers.
- 1990. (with Kodratoff, Y, Eds.) Machine learning: An artificial intelligence approach. Vol. III. Los Altos, CA: Morgan-Kaufmann.
- 1993. Multistrategy Learning: A Special Issue of MACHINE LEARNING. Springer.
- 1994. (with George Tecuci, Eds) Machine Learning: A Multistrategy Approach, Volume IV. Morgan Kaufmann
- 1998. (with Ivan Bratko & Miroslav Kubat, Eds.) Machine Learning and Data Mining: Methods and Applications. Wiley

=== Articles ===
- 1980. Pattern recognition as rule-guided inductive inference. IEEE Transactions on Pattern Analysis and Machine Intelligence, 2, 349–361.
- 1980. Knowledge Acquisition Through Conceptual Clustering: A Theoretical Framework and an Algorithm for Partitioning Data into Conjunctive Concepts. Journal of Policy Analysis and Information Systems. 4. 219-244.
- 1986. (with Pat Langley) Editorial: Machine Learning and Discovery. Machine Learning 1: 363–366, 1986. Kluwer Academic Publishers, Boston.
- 1986. (with Brian C. Falkenhainer) Integrating quantitative and qualitative discovery: The ABACUS system. Machine Learning: Volume 1, Issue 4, pp 367–401.
