= Attributional calculus =

Logic and representation system

Attributional calculus is a logic and representation system defined by Ryszard S. Michalski. It combines elements of predicate logic, propositional calculus, and multi-valued logic. Attributional calculus provides a formal language for natural induction, which is an inductive learning process whose outcomes are in human-readable forms.
