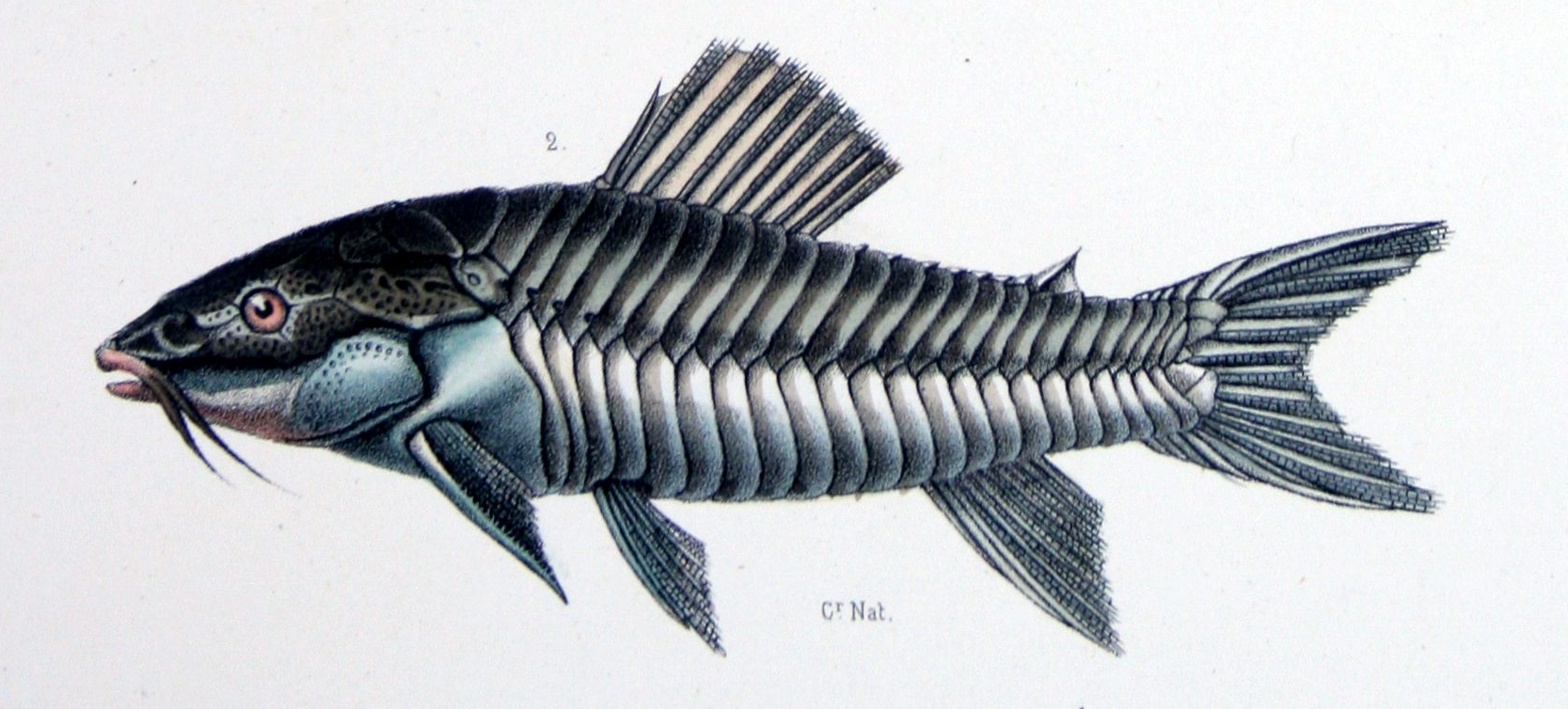
- Hoplosternum littorale

Scientific classification
- Kingdom: Animalia
- Phylum: Chordata
- Class: Actinopterygii
- Order: Siluriformes
- Family: Callichthyidae
- Subfamily: Callichthyinae
- Genus: Hoplosternum; T. N. Gill, 1858

Type species
- Callichthys laevigatus Valenciennes, 1834

Synonyms
- Cascadura Ellis, 1913; Cataphractops Fowler, 1915; Ellisichthys A. Miranda-Ribeiro, 1920; Diasternum Franz, 2001

= Hoplosternum =

Hoplosternum Temporal range: Middle Miocene - Recent

Genus of fishes

Hoplosternum is a genus of freshwater ray-finned fish belonging to the family Callichthyidae and the subfamily Callichthyinae, the armoured catfishes. The genus Holplosternum is found in southern Central America and South America.

A fossil catfish has been identified as Hoplosternum sp. from the middle Miocene in the La Venta formation, Magdalena River basin, Colombia.

== Taxonomy ==
Hoplosternum was first proposed as a genus in 1858 by the American zoologist Theodore Gill, with Callichthys laevigatus designated as its type species. C. laevigatus had been first formally described in 1834 by Achille Valenciennes, with its type locality given as Buenos Aires, Argentina. C. laevigatus is now considered to be a junior synonym of Callichthys littoralis, the basionym of Hoplosternum littorale, which was originally described in 1828 by John Hancock. This genus is included in the subfamily Callichthyinae of the armoured catfish family, Callichthyidae, which is in the suborder Loricarioidei of the catfish order Siluriformes.

== Etymology ==
Hoplosternum combines the Greek hóplon, meaning "shield" or "armour", with "sternum", which is derived from stérnon, which means "breast" or "chest", an allusion to the well-developed coracoid bones in the chests of these catfishes.

== Species ==
Hoplosternum contains the following valid species:

- Hoplosternum littorale (Hancock, 1828) (Atipa)
- Hoplosternum magdalenae C. H. Eigenmann, 1913 (Striped hoplo)
- Hoplosternum punctatum Meek & Hildebrand, 1916

== Distribution ==
Hoplosternum species are found from Panama south to Argentina, including the island of Trinidad, with one species, H. littorale, being introduced to Florida.

== Ecology ==
Hoplosternum is normally found in large schools on the muddy bottoms of slow-moving rivers, pools, drainage ditches, and swampy areas. In water with low oxygen content, the fish are capable of utilizing atmospheric air by taking in a gulp of air at the surface of the water and passing it back to the hind gut. The walls of the gut are lined with tiny blood vessels into which the oxygen from the air can pass, similar to the function of true lungs. The remaining gasses pass out through the anus. When there is a severe drought, these air breathers are able to traverse short stretches of land seeking better conditions. The fish is also capable of making sounds,o both grunts and squeaks.

Like other callichthyines, Hoplosternum species build bubble nests. Among callichthyines, H. littorale has the most complex nest structure.

== Reproduction ==
Hoplosternum is a builder of bubblenests from plant parts, some bottom materials, and bubbles formed by a mouth secretion and air. The male forms a mass of bubbles about 20 cm (8 in.) in diameter and 10 cm (4 in) high. During the time of construction, the female is actively chased away or ignored. When the nest construction is complete, the male will accept the female. The eggs (up to several hundred) are deposited into the nest. The male or the pair will actively protect the nest for about four weeks until the fry come out of the nest at the size of 2.5 cm (1 in).

== Cuisine ==
Hoplosternum is also known by the nickname hassa in Guyana and other parts of South America. It is called cascadoux in Trinidad and Tobago, tamuatá in Brazil, and kwi kwi in Suriname. It is eaten by West Indians and is normally served curried with roti, rice or pigeon peas.
