= June 1937 =

Month of 1937

<<	June 1937					>>
Su	Mo	Tu	We	Th	Fr	Sa
		1	2	3	4	5
6	7	8	9	10	11	12
13	14	15	16	17	18	19
20	21	22	23	24	25	26
27	28	29	30

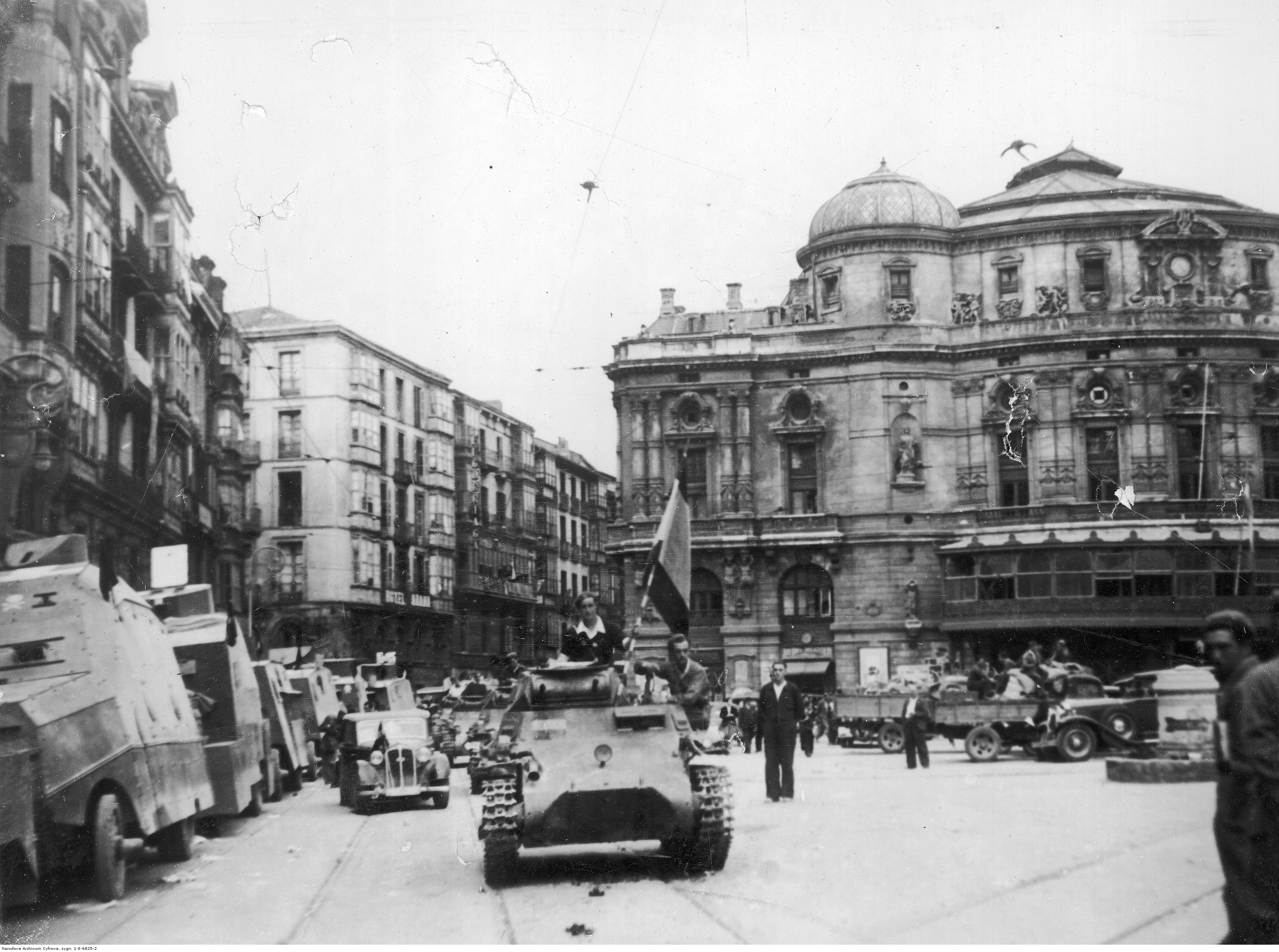
June 19, 1937: Spanish Nationalist rebels led by Generalissimo Francisco Franco capture Bilbao after seven-day battle.

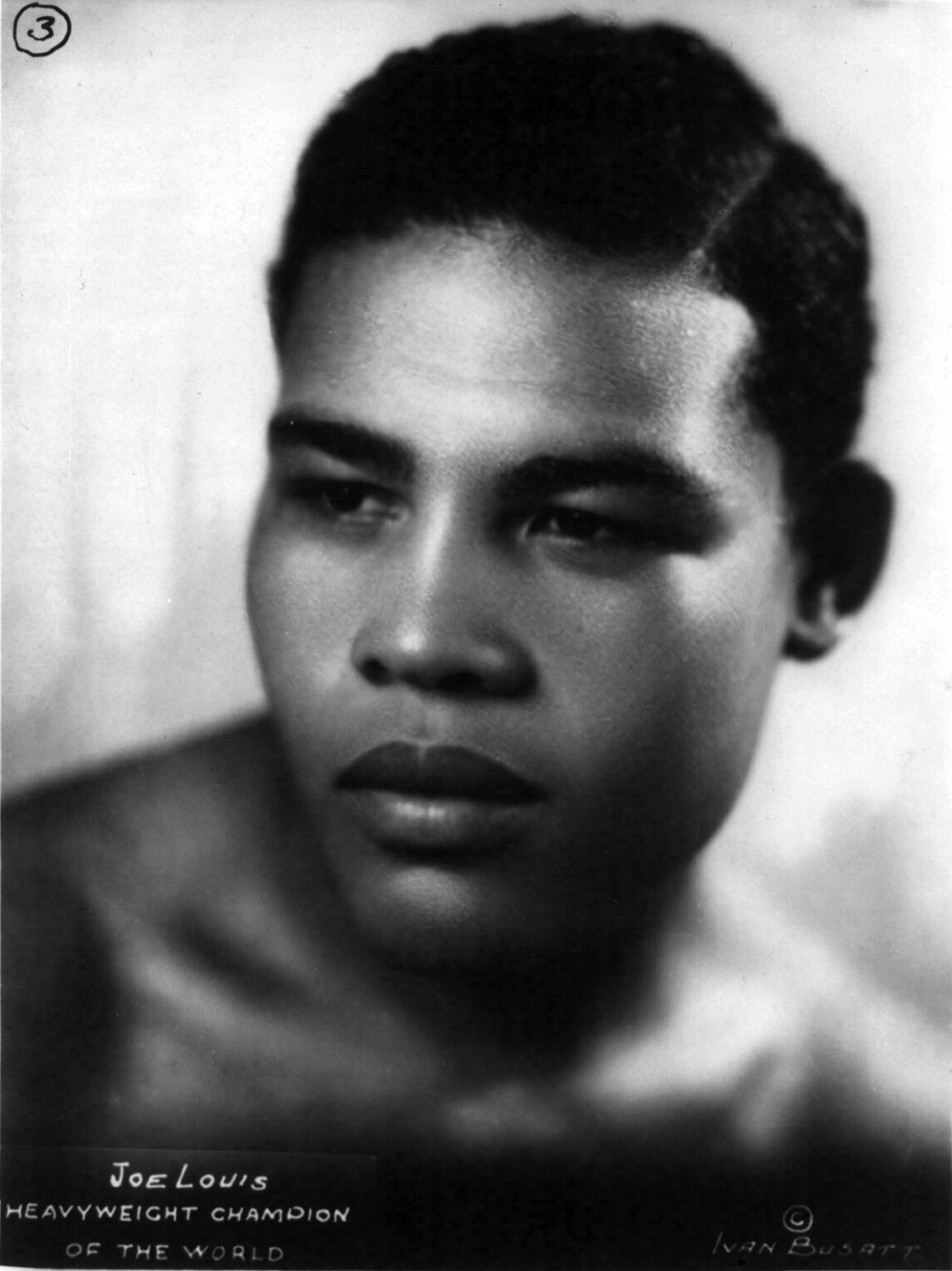
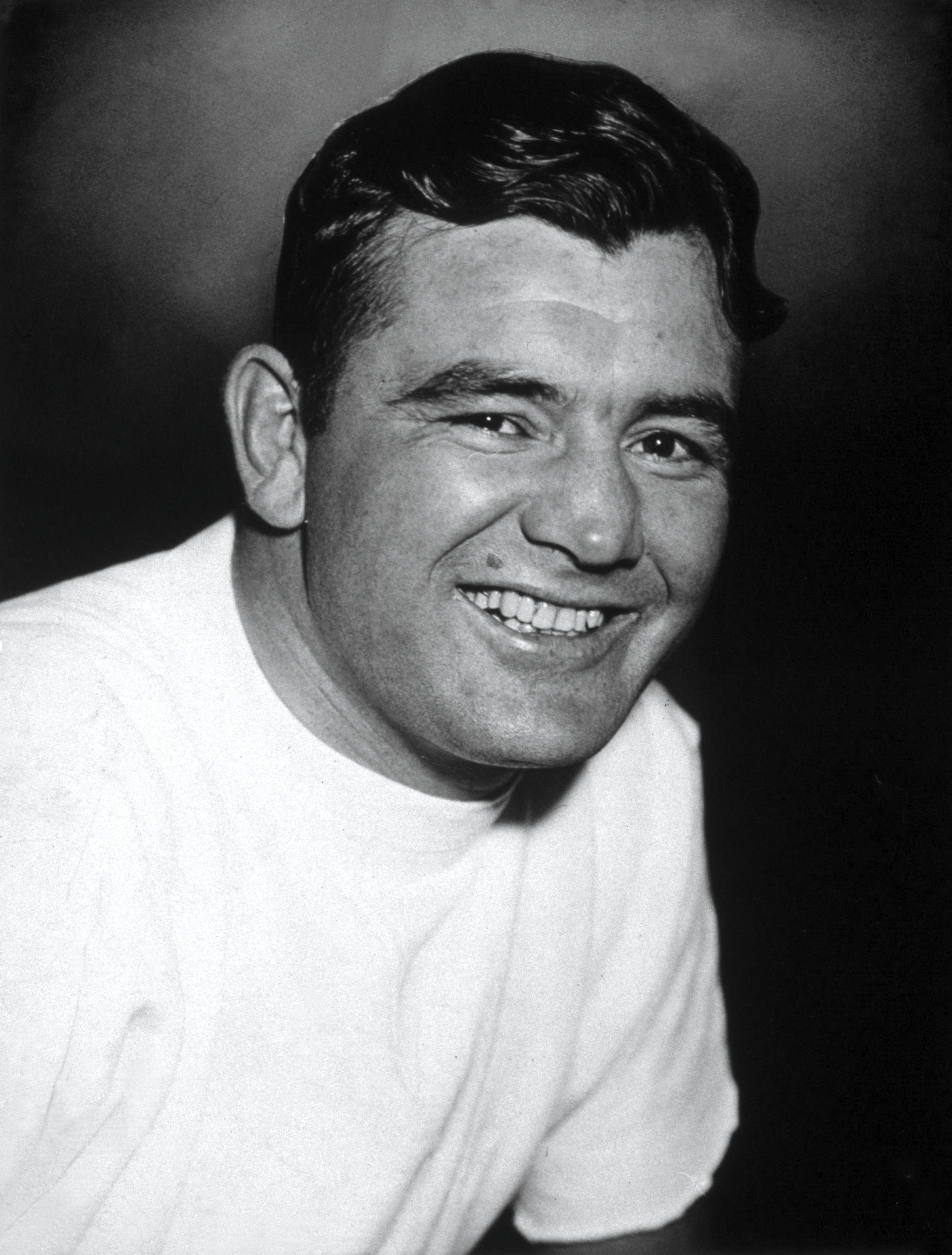
June 22, 1937: Challenger Joe Louis defeats champion Jim Braddock to win undisputed world heavyweight boxing championship.

The following events occurred in June 1937:

== June 1, 1937 (Tuesday) ==
- In newspapers across the U.S., Oldsmobile announced the first automatic transmission available to the public, to be a feature in the 1938 model Oldsmobile Eight. The advertisement offered demonstrations the Automatic-Safety-Transmission at local dealers and boasted "First News of the Most Sensational Transmission Development in 20 years... An Astonishing New Automatic Gear-Shift That Sets a New World Standard of Driving Ease, Performance and Economy... New! Nothing Else Like It in the World!"
- Aviator Amelia Earhart and her navigator, Fred Noonan, departed the United States in her Lockheed Model 10 Electra twin-engine airplane to begin her mission to become the first woman to circumnavigate the Earth. Earhart and Noonan took off from Miami at 5:55 in the morning local time toward San Juan, Puerto Rico, leaving the United States for the last time, and landed at 12:30 in the afternoon. By the end of the month, they were in New Guinea at Lae.
- Bill Dietrich of the Chicago White Sox pitched an 8-0 no-hitter against the St. Louis Browns. The feat was the only no-hitter of the 1937 MLB season and the first in the Major Leagues since August 31, 1935.
- In Italy, the Ministry of Popular Culture ordered all foreign words and names to be Italianized. Louis Armstrong, for example, was to be known as Luigi Fortebraccio.
- Born:
  - Morgan Freeman, American actor, director and narrator, 2004 Academy Award winner for Best Supporting Actor; in Memphis, Tennessee
  - Rosaleen Linehan, Irish actress; in Dublin

== June 2, 1937 (Wednesday) ==
- Rioting broke out around İskenderun and Antioch after the Syrian parliament refused to ratify the League of Nations' decision to make the İskenderun district autonomous.
- Willis Van Devanter, who had served on the U.S. Supreme Court since 1911, retired at the age of 78 after a new law had passed providing for full pay in retirement for any justice who retired after reaching 70.
- German War Minister Werner von Blomberg began a three-day visit to Italy to discuss military ties between the two nations.
- The first Printer's Devilry puzzle, a form of crossword invented by "Afrit" (Alistair Ferguson Ritchie) was published, making its initial appearance in The Listener, a British weekly magazine.

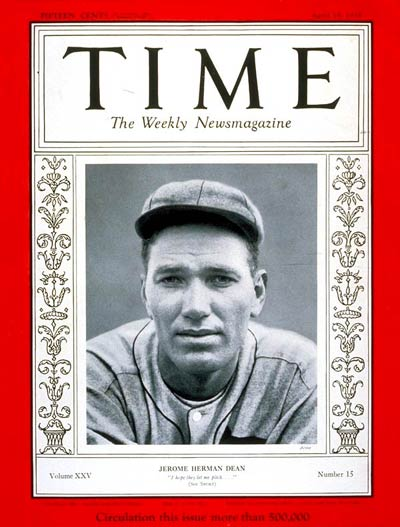
Jay "Dizzy" Dean

- St. Louis Cardinals pitcher Dizzy Dean was suspended by National League President Ford C. Frick for referring to Frick and umpire George Barr as "the two biggest crooks in baseball today." Dizzy Dean refused to sign a letter of apology and threatened to sue Ford Frick for $250,000, but did issue a "letter of explanation" and was reinstated on June 5. He lost $500 during the course of his suspension.
- Born:
  - Jimmy Jones, U.S. singer-songwriter; in Birmingham, Alabama (d. 2012)
  - Sally Kellerman, American actress and singer; in Long Beach, California (d. 2022)
  - Don Turnbull, English journalist, editor and game designer; in Preston, Lancashire(d. 2003)
- Died: Louis Vierne, 66, French organist and composer collapsed from a stroke while performing a concert at the Notre-Dame de Paris cathedral. As he was playing the closing section of "Stèle pour un enfant défunt" from his Triptyque Opus 58, Vierne suddenly fell forward, then off of the bench.

== June 3, 1937 (Thursday) ==
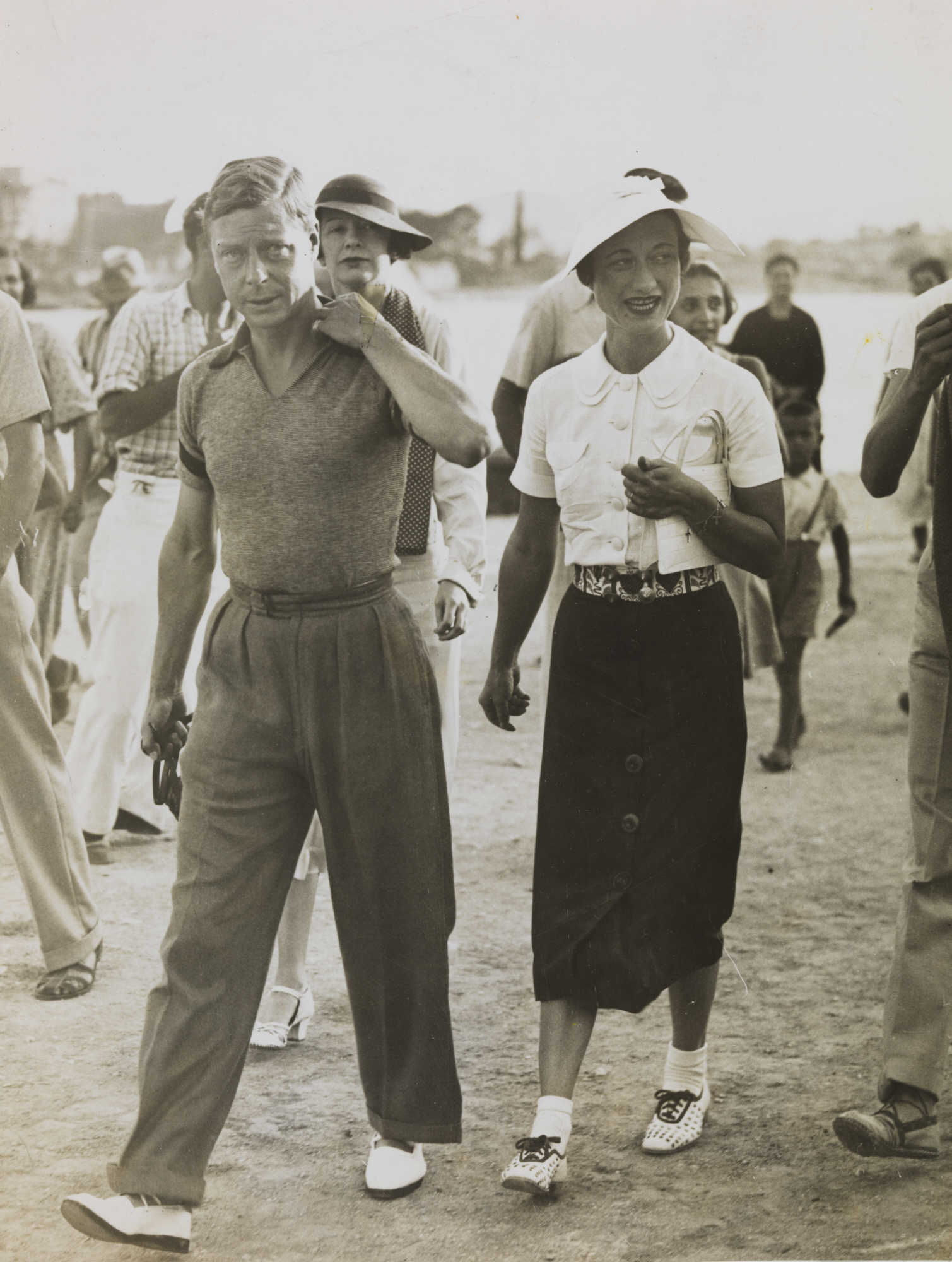
The former King and the former Mrs. Simpson

- The Duke of Windsor, formerly King Edward VIII, and Wallis Warfield Simpson were married at the Château de Candé in Monts, Indre-et-Loire in France. Reportedly, the religious ceremony by an Anglican priest came "after the wedding party had come in from highballs and cocktails on the terrace," and no member of the British royal family was present at the ceremonies.
- American Communist Juliet Stuart Poyntz, who had worked secretly for the Soviet Union as a spy against the U.S., vanished shortly after she severed relations with the Soviets. She was last seen in public as she was leaving her apartment at the American Woman's Association clubhouse at 353 West 57th Street in New York City and was apparently kidnapped while outside her apartment building. Her disappearance was not reported in the press until December 18.
- Born: Solomon P. Ortiz, U.S. Representative for Texas for 28 years from 1983 to 2011 politician, in Robstown, Texas
- Died: Emilio Mola, 49, Spanish Nationalist commander and one of the four leaders of the military uprising that began the Spanish Civil War, was killed along with five other people when their airplane crashed. Flying in a fog, the Airspeed Envoy struck the side of a mountain near the town of Briviesca. The other three uprising leaders had been José Sanjurjo (who died in a crash in 1936); Manuel Goded (who was captured and executed by the Nationalist government in 1936) and Francisco Franco, who would control Spain for the next 38 years.

== June 4, 1937 (Friday) ==
- The first modern shopping cart, invented by supermarket owner Sylvan Goldman, was introduced at the Humpty Dumpty he owned in Oklahoma City. While vertical metal baskets on a frame with wheels had been introduced in some stores in 1933, Goldman's cart was the first of the shape and size that would become the standard that would still be used almost 90 years later.
- The Battle of Pochonbo took place in the northern section of Japanese-occupied Korea as a unit of 150 members of the Northeast Counter-Japanese United Army guerrilla group crossed the border from China and attacked a detachment of the Japanese Imperial Army at Pochon-up and briefly occupied the town before being forced to retreat. According to North Korea, the 25-year-old commander of the Sixth Division of the Counter-Japanese guerrillas, Kim Il Sung, led the group into battle and destroyed different Japanese-operated municipal services. Kim would later become the Great Leader of North Korea upon its founding in 1945.
- Prince Fumimaro Konoe became the new Prime Minister of Japan, replacing General Senjūrō Hayashi and serving until 1939.
- Nazi Germany's Navy, the Kriegsmarine, held its first maneuvers off Heligoland since the island was refortified in defiance of the Treaty of Versailles. Only a skeleton fleet participated because so many ships were deployed in Spain.
- Born:
  - Mortimer Zuckerman, Canadian-born U.S. media mogul, journalist, and billionaire; in Montreal
  - Gorilla Monsoon (ring name for Robert James Marella), American professional wrestler and commentator; in Rochester, New York(d. 1999)
- Died: Helmut Hirsch, 21, German Jew convicted of conspiring in a bombing plot against the government, was executed by guillotine.

== June 5, 1937 (Saturday) ==
- War Admiral, who had captured the Kentucky Derby and the Preakness in May, won the Belmont Stakes by three lengths to become only the fourth thoroughbred horse to win the U.S. Triple Crown.
- French troops were rushed to the İskenderun region to control the rioting between Arabs and Turks.
- Died: John Challen, 72, Welsh cricketer and footballer for the Wales national teams from 1887 to 1890

== June 6, 1937 (Sunday) ==
- The city of Rabaul, capital of the Territory of New Guinea, was destroyed by an eruption of the Tavurvur volcano and 507 people were killed. Most of the island's residents had been evacuated by ships from several nations prior to the blast.
- The Soviet Union inaugurated North Pole-1 (Severnia Polyos-1), the world's first "drifting ice station", beginning operations (including an airstrip) on a floating ice floe located only 12 miles (19 km) from the North Pole.
- In the Spanish Civil War the Segovia Offensive, started on May 31 by the Spanish Republic's Army to divert the Nationalist rebels, was abandoned after the loss of 3,000 troops, 1,000 of whom were in the XIV International Brigade.
- The Coppa Italia, the premier tournament of Italian association football, was won by Genoa 1893 (now Genoa CFC) over AS Roma 1–0, at the Stadio Comunale Giovanni Berta (now the Stadio Artemio Franchi) in Florence. finished sixth in the 1936–37 Serie A league and AS Roma 10th, while Serie A champion Bologna FC 1909 had been eliminated in the first round.
- Born: Yan Shunkai, Chinese comedian, actor and film director; in Shanghai (d. 2017)

== June 7, 1937 (Monday) ==
- Benito Mussolini and Galeazzo Ciano became the first recipients of the Order of the German Eagle.
- Born:
  - Roberto Blanco, German singer and actor; in Tunis
  - Neeme Järvi, Estonian conductor; in Tallinn

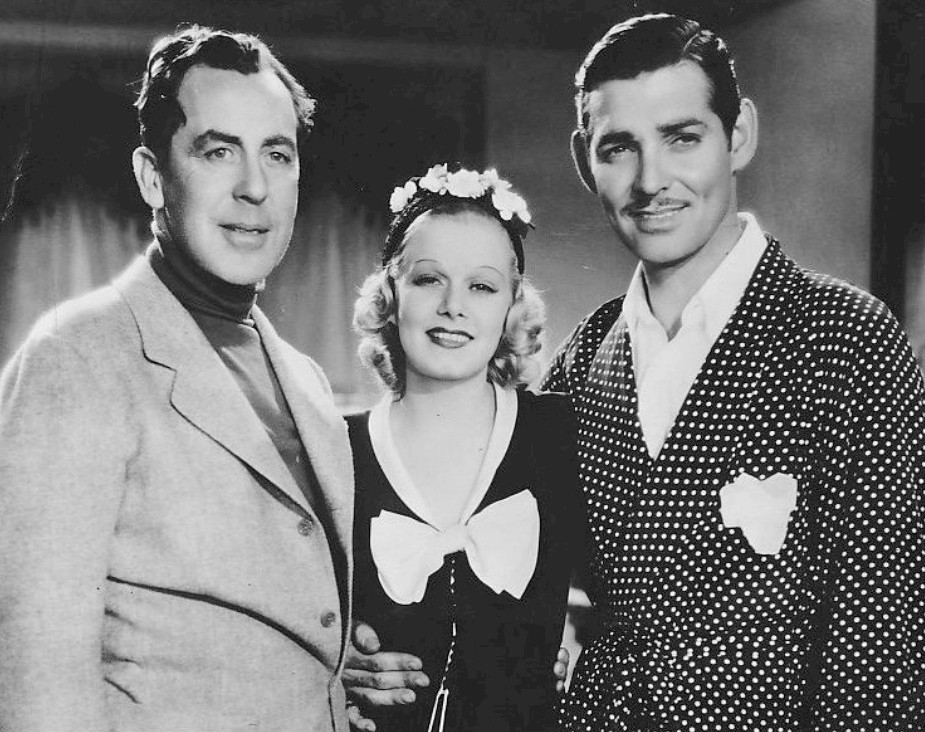
The last photo of Jean Harlow (pictured with Robert Conway and Clark Gable), taken May 29 during the filming of Saratoga.

- Died: Jean Harlow (stage name for Harlean Harlow Carpenter), 26, American actress, died from kidney failure, nine days after having become ill during the filming of a scene in her final movie, Saratoga.

== June 8, 1937 (Tuesday) ==
- In London, representatives of Argentina, Australia, Great Britain, Ireland, Norway, South Africa, Germany and the United States reached an agreement to stop the dangerous reduction of the world's whale stocks through whaling.
- In San Juan, Puerto Rico, an assassination attempt on the life of U.S. District Judge Robert A. Cooper, the day after he had sentenced Pedro Albizu Campos and eight other Puerto Rican nationalists to long terms at the U.S. Penitentiary in Atlanta. The assailants fired at least 12 bullets at Cooper's car as he was driving past them, though neither Cooper nor his bodyguard Francisco Davila were injured.
- The German Postal Ministry decreed that all non-Aryans must retire.
- A total solar eclipse that had the longest (at more than seven minutes) totality since the year 1098, was visible over the Pacific Ocean. Occurring between 18:04 to 23:17 UTC, it had the distinction of beginning at sunrise on Wednesday, June 9, local time over the Gilbert and Ellice Islands, and ending at sunset on Tuesday, June 8, local time in Peru.
- The Carl Orff composition Carmina Burana premiered in Frankfurt.
- The French war film La Grande Illusion (The Grand Illusion) directed by Jean Renoir was released.
- Born: Toni Harper, American child singer; in Los Angeles (d. 2023)
- Died: Monroe Owsley, 36, American stage and film actor known for Honor Among Lovers with Claudette Colbert, died of a heart attack.

== June 9, 1937 (Wednesday) ==
- The Amateur Rowing Association (ARA) of Great Britain, under criticism for excluding the Australian National Team from the Grand Challenge Cup a year earlier because the crew, all policemen, were excluded from the ARA definition of amateurism because they had been employed for wages, permanently repealed its exclusionary policy. In 1886, the ARA had barred any person "who is or has been by trade or employment for wages a mechanic, artisan or labourer." The Henley Royal Regatta followed suit the next day, as both organizations changed their rules to bar only people who had accepted financial compensation for competing in sport.
- The funeral of Jean Harlow was held at a chapel in the Forest Lawn Memorial Park in Glendale, California. William Powell, Lionel Barrymore, Clark Gable, Spencer Tracy and Norma Shearer were among the mourners in attendance.
- The Citizens' War Memorial was unveiled in Christchurch, New Zealand.
- The Girl Guides temporarily formed a new chapter, the "1st Buckingham Palace Company", with 20 girls who were children of people who worked at the Royal Household and Palace, including 11-year-old Princess Elizabeth, daughter of King George VI. At the same time, the 14-member Brownie Pack chapter for younger girls, including 6-year-old Princess Margaret.
- Born: Harald Rosenthal; German hydriobiologist; in Berlin
- Died:
  - Carlo Rosselli, 37, the former leader of Italy's Unitary Socialist Party and a critic of Italy's Fascist leader Benito Mussolini, was shot to death along with his brother Nello Rosselli, 36. The gunmen were members of the French fascist group La Cagoule, apparently after being hired by the Mussolini government. The two were visiting the French resort town of Bagnoles-de-l'Orne when they were killed.
  - Francisco Olazábal, 50, Mexican-American Christian evangelist and faith healer, died eight days after being fatally injured in a car accident.

== June 10, 1937 (Thursday) ==
- German-born biochemist Hans Krebs and his colleague William Arthur Johnson first described the citric acid cycle— commonly called the "Krebs cycle" — in a short manuscript sent to Nature, the British weekly scientific journal. The editor of Nature rejected the submission and suggested that he "submit it for early publication to another periodical." Krebs wrote a longer version of his paper which was published two months later by the Dutch journal Enzymologia.
- Nazi Germany announced an ambitious 15-year development plan for the city of Hamburg that envisioned the construction of a 60-story skyscraper and a suspension bridge across the Elbe.
- Born:
  - Luciana Paluzzi, Italian film actress; in Rome
  - Richard Foreman, American avant-garde playwright; as Edward L. Friedman in New York City (d.2025)
- Died:
  - Sir Robert Borden, 82, Prime Minister of Canada from 1911 to 1920
  - Dennis Kincaid, 31, British novelist and civil servant, known for The Grand Rebel: An Impression of Shivaji, Founder of the Maratha Empire (1936), drowned while swimming in the ocean during a rough sea.
  - Jane Foss Barff, 73, Australian women's rights advocate.

== June 11, 1937 (Friday) ==
- The secret Moscow trial known as the Case of Trotskyist Anti-Soviet Military Organization began.
- The comedy film A Day at the Races, starring the Marx Brothers, was released.
- Born:
  - Robin Warren, Australian pathologist and Nobel laureate; in Adelaide, South Australia (d. 2024)
  - Don Fleming, American college and professional football player; in Bellaire, Ohio (killed in construction accident,. 1963)
- Died:
  - R. J. Mitchell, 42, British aircraft designer known for the Supermarine flying boats, died from colorectal cancer. Mitchell would later be the subject of the 1942 British film The First of the Few.
  - Máté Zalka, 41, Hungarian writer and revolutionary, was killed in the Spanish Civil War while fighting for the International Brigades in aid of the Spanish Second Republic.

== June 12, 1937 (Saturday) ==
- The Trotskyist Anti-Soviet Military Trial ended swiftly with eight Soviet generals shot for treason the day after being found guilty of accusations of espionage. Those executed were Marshal of the Soviet Union Mikhail Tukhachevsky; General Boris Feldman; Colonel General Vitaly Primakov; General Vitovt Putna; General Ieronim Uborevich; General Iona Yakir; General Roberts Eidemanis; and General August Kork.
- The Battle of Bilbao started in the Spanish Civil War as the Nationalists launched an assault on the city. The attack prompted the evacuation of 1,500 children on the oceean liner Habana, with an escort by the Royal Navy warship HMS Hood to transport "los niños de la guerra" to the United Kingdom. Within seven days, Bilbao would be under Nationalist control.
- The Spanish Republicans launched the Huesca Offensive in an ultimately unsuccessful attempt to divert the Spanish Nationalists attack on Bilbao.
- Sidney Kingsley's popular Broadway play Dead End, which introduced the "Dead End Kids" franchise of 89 films, closed after 687 performances.
- Golfer Ralph Guldahl won the U.S. Open, defeating Sam Snead by two strokes.
- The Greater Texas & Pan-American Exposition opened in Dallas, Texas.
- The body of Henry Clay Torrence of Richmond, California, was recovered on Angel Island in San Francisco Bay. Torrence was the first person to die by falling from the Golden Gate Bridge after its opening, but whether his death was an accident, suicide or murder is unknown.
- Born:
  - Mujaddid Ahmed Ijaz, Pakistani-born American experimental physicist known for the discovery of new isotopes; in Baddomalhi, Punjab Province, British India (d. 1992 of cancer)
  - Vladimir Arnold, Ukrainian mathematician known for the Kolmogorov–Arnold representation theorem, the Arnold conjecture and for Arnold invariants; in Odessa, Ukrainian SSR, Soviet Union (d. 2010 of pancreatitis)
  - Dr. Sidney M. Wolfe, American physician and consumer advocate against unsafe pharmaceuticals; in Cleveland (d.2024)
- Died:
  - Royal Navy Captain Cecil Ryther Acklom, 65, Romanian-born British Navy officer knowwn for the development of the torpedo
  - Maria Ulyanova, 59, Soviet Russian revolutionary and younger sister of Vladimir Lenin, died of heart disease.

== June 13, 1937 (Sunday) ==
- The Spanish Nationalists under the command of Generalissimo Francisco Franco came within 2 miles (3.2 km) of Bilbao, capturing a range of hills east of the city. The Nationalists captured Las Arenas the next day, cutting Bilbao off from the sea.
- Keio University defeated Kobe University of Commerce, 3 to 0, to win Japan's Emperor's Cup soccer football championship.
- Died: William F. Lloyd, 72, Prime Minister of the Dominion of Newfoundland from 1918 to 1919

== June 14, 1937 (Monday) ==
- Brazil set aside land for the first of 76 national parks, as a decree of President Getúlio Vargas created the Itatiaia National Park from parts of the states of Rio de Janeiro and Minas Gerais.
- The Irish Parliament was dissolved and new elections called for July 1.
- The Social Credit backbenchers' revolt in Alberta came to an end when Premier William Aberhart finally got a budget passed in the legislature by a vote of 40–7.
- The Happy Gang, a popular radio show that would run for 22 years on the CBC Radio Network premiered on the radio station CRCT, before moving in October to the other CBC affiliates. The first cast had host Bert Pearl ("that slap-happy chappy, the Happy Gang's Own Pappy"), trumpeter Bob Farnon, violinist Blain Mathé and organist Kay Stokes, the only cast member who would remain with the show during its entire run.
- Born: Jørgen Leth, Danish documentary filmmaker and sports commentator; in Aarhus (d. 2025)

== June 15, 1937 (Tuesday) ==
- An avalanche killed 16 people on a German expedition making an ascent of the Himalayan mountain of Siniolchu in Sikkim, now part of India. The Deutsche Himalaja-Stiftung team, led by Karl Wien, was camping for the night when, at 12:10 in the morning local time, a cornice broke above Wien's camp, burying tents in snow 10 feet (3.0 m) high. Seven German climbers and nine Sherpa guides were crushed to death.
- A total reward of $1,500 was ordered by U.S. Attorney General Homer Cummings for members of the Brady Gang of armed robbers, led by Al Brady. The Justice Department offered $500 apiece for any information furnished to the FBI resulting in the apprehension of Brady, James Dalhover or Clarence Lee Shaffer Jr. The Brady gang was traced four months later to Bangor, Maine, where Everett Hurd, owner of Dakin's Sporting Goods Store, had been approached by the gang for the purchase of several Thompson submachine guns and 500 rounds of .30-caliber ammunition. On October 12, 1937, because of Hurd's tip, FBI agents were ready when Brady, Dalhover and Shaffer returned to the store to collect their purchase. Dalhover was captured alive while Brady and Shaffer were killed in a shootout.
- Switzerland recognized the Italian conquest of Ethiopia.
- The one-act ballet Checkmate, created by choreographer Ninette de Valois and composer Arthur Bliss, premiered, making its debut at the Théâtre des Champs-Élysées in Paris. The ballet featured characters based on pieces from the game of chess, with dancers portraying red and black pieces, built around a romance between the "Red Knight" (Harold Turner) and the "Black Queen" (June Brae).
- Born:
  - Waylon Jennings, American country music singer and actor, known for the theme from The Dukes of Hazzard; near Littlefield, Texas (d. 2002)
  - Herbert Feuerstein, Austrian-born German comedian, magazine editor and television actor; in Zell am See (d. 2020)
  - K. A. Siddiqui, Pakistani botanist and genetic engineer; in Indore, Central Provinces and Berar, British India (d.2009)
  - Alan Thornett, British Trotskyist activist; in Oxfordshire
- Died: William P. Connery Jr., 48, U.S. Representative for Massachusetts since 1923, and chairman of the House Labor Committee, died from food poisoning.

== June 16, 1937 (Wednesday) ==
- Spanish Prime Minister Juan Negrín banned the Communist political party POUM (Partido Obrero de Unificación Marxista or Workers' Party for Marxist Unification). Party Chairman Andreu Nin, who had served as the Justice Minister for Revolutionary Catalonia during its brief existence as an autonomous state within Spain, was arrested along with other leaders. After his arrest, Nin was turned over to Soviet agents within Spain and was not seen in public again.
- Germany and Italy rejoined neutral ship patrols around Spain.
- Born:
  - Simeon Sakskoburggotski, who ruled Bulgaria as King Simeon II from 1943 to 1946, and later was elected as Prime Minister to serve from 2001 to 2005; in Sofia
  - August Busch III, American businessman and chairman of the board of the Anheuser-Busch beer brewing company from 1977 to 2006, as well as being the great-grandson of the company's founder Adolphus Busch; in St. Louis, Missouri
  - Charmian May, English actress; in Purbrook, Hampshire (d. 2002)
  - Marilyn Van Derbur, American TV hostess and motivational speaker who was crowned as Miss America 1958; in Denver, Colorado
- Died: Alexander Chervyakov, 45, Soviet Belarusian Communist leader, committed suicide before being arrested as part of the Great Purge.

== June 17, 1937 (Thursday) ==
- An explosion on the Spanish Navy battleship Jaime I killed at least 50 crew while the ship was in harbor at the Republic's naval base in Cartagena, according to a statement from the Spanish government, which provided a state funeral for the dead sailors, although later accounts placed the death toll at "at least 200".
- A state funeral was held in Germany for 31 victims of the May 29 Deutschland incident.
- The adventure film King Solomon's Mines premiered in the United Kingdom.
- The drama film The Road Back starring John King and Richard Cromwell premiered at the Globe Theatre in New York City.
- The Cuban band Orquesta Casino de la Playa recorded "Bruca maniguá", Arsenio Rodríguez's first hit.
- Born:
  - Clodovil Hernandes, Brazilian fashion designer, television host and politician who was the first openly gay member of the Brazilian Congress; in Catanduva, São Paulo (d.2009)
  - Arthur Schmidt, American film editor and winner of two Academy Awards for editing of Forrest Gump and Who Framed Roger Rabbit; in Los Angeles (d.2023)
- Died: Marvel Rea, 35, American silent film actress, committed suicide 10 months after having been kidnapped and raped by a gang of three men.

== June 18, 1937 (Friday) ==
- In Spain, the Nationalists captured the Santo Domingo hills northeast of Bilbao after a week-long assault and surrounded the city completely.
- Achille Starace, Secretary of the National Fascist Party, decreed that all party members were required to subscribe to Benito Mussolini's newspaper, Il Popolo d'Italia.
- Born:
  - Vitaly Zholobov, Soviet Ukrainian cosmonaut on the 1976 Soyuz 21 mission to the Salyut 5 space station, later the Governor of Kherson Oblast from 1985 to 1996; in Zburjevka, Ukrainian SSR
  - Gail Godwin, American novelist; in Birmingham, Alabama
  - Wray Carlton, American football player, AFL and CFL running back; in Wallace, North Carolina
- Died: Gaston Doumergue, 73, President of France from 1924 to 1931

== June 19, 1937 (Saturday) ==
- In the Spanish Civil War, the Battle of Bilbao ended with the Nationalists capturing the city. At the same time, the Republicans' Huesca Offensive failed to turn back the Nationalists.
- In Trinidad and Tobago, oil workers led by union organizar Tubal "Buzz" Butler walked out on strike. When police attempted to arrest Butler as he was addressing a crowd in Fyzabad, rioting began on the island of Trinidad.
- What would later be dubbed the "Women's Day Massacre" occurred in Youngstown, Ohio in fighting between Youngstown police and strikers during the "Little Steel strike". Two people died and 23 were injured over two days of rioting.
- The Australian Academy of Art, an attempt by the conservative Australian government to give official endorsement of specific genres of art, was founded at a hotel in Canberra by delegates from Australia's states, led by future prime minister Robert Menzies. The Academy would be dissolved in 1946.
- Pennsylvania Governor George H. Earle declared martial law in Johnstown in order to prevent violence at the Bethlehem Steel Corporation's mill at Cambria during an ongoing strike. Earle sent 500 Pennsylvania State Troopers and Highway Patrol to close the mill and evacuate the people inside, then enforce the law within the city. The United Mine Workers voluntarily called off a planned Sunday march of 40,000 miners.
- Born: Bak Lung-won, the White Dragon King (Bak Lung-wong), Thailand-born Hong Kong Taoist said to have the power to bless the careers of his clients toward success, including Jackie Chan, Tony Leung and Shu Qi; as Chow Yam-nam, in Pattaya (d.2013)
- Died:
  - J. M. Barrie, 77, Scottish author and dramatist known for creating Peter Pan
  - Yakov Doletsky, 48, Polish-born Soviet journalist who served the executive director of the Soviet news agency TASS from 1925 to 1937, committed suicide after learning that he was to be arrested as part of Stalin's Great Purge.

== June 20, 1937 (Sunday) ==
- The longest transpolar flight up to that time, from Moscow to the United States over the North Pole, was completed as Valery Chkalov, Georgy Baydukov and Alexander Belyakov landed their Tupolev ANT-25 airplane at an airfield at the Vancouver Barracks at Vancouver, Washington. Though their original destination was Oakland, California, the Soviets' landing demonstrated that a north-south flight over the North Pole between two northern nations was shorter than a flight on an east-west route. The flight was made to test the prospects of trans-polar air travel.
- All Catholic schools in the Nazi German state of Bavaria were declared abolished by order of the Gauleiter (state premier) Adolf Wagner.
- The Geibeltbad Pirna, at the time the largest (2,000 square meters or 21,500 square feet) outdoor swimming pool in the world, opened near Dresden, Germany. The Geibeltbad had a capacity for as many as 2,500 people.
- A crowd of 101,000 fans attended the 1937 German football championship to watch FC Schalke 04 defeat 1. FC Nürnberg, 2 to 0, to win the Viktoria Trophy of German soccer football (fußball).
- Born: Rosa Luna, Uruguayan dancer (d. 1993)
- Died: Henny Magnussen, 58, the first woman barrister in Denmark, died from heart disease.

== June 21, 1937 (Monday) ==
- Léon Blum resigned as Prime Minister of France when the Senate refused to give him special powers to deal with the country's financial crisis.
- The Wimbledon tennis tournament was televised for the first time, as BBC Television commentator Freddie Grisewood gave commentary on the opening matches for the few people in London who had a television set. Using three television vans to supply the equipment, the BBC was able to show a live event outside of its studios for the first time. For 25 minutes, Grisewood spoke as viewers saw parts of two opening matches, starting with Bunny Austin of England against George Lyttleton Rogers of Ireland, followed by Jack Crawford of Australia against Roderich Menzel of Czechoslovakia. Crawford and Austin won their matches and advanced to the second round.
- Ohio Governor Martin L. Davey ordered 4,500 National Guardsmen to Youngstown to stop rioting during the Little Steel strike against Republic Steel.
- Born: Sizakele Sigxashe, South African anti-apartheid activist and first director of the nation's National Intelligence Agency; in South Africa (d. 2011)
- Died: Janis Pauluks, 71, Prime Minister of Latvia for six months in 1923

== June 22, 1937 (Tuesday) ==
- Joe Louis won boxing's World Heavyweight Championship with an eighth-round knockout of champion James J. Braddock at Comiskey Park in Chicago.
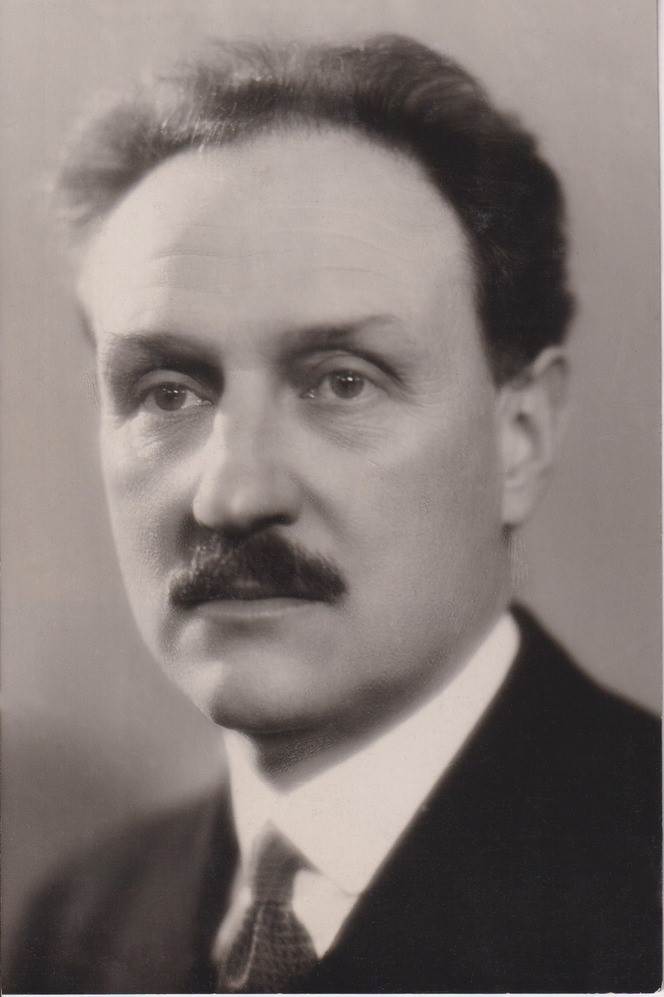
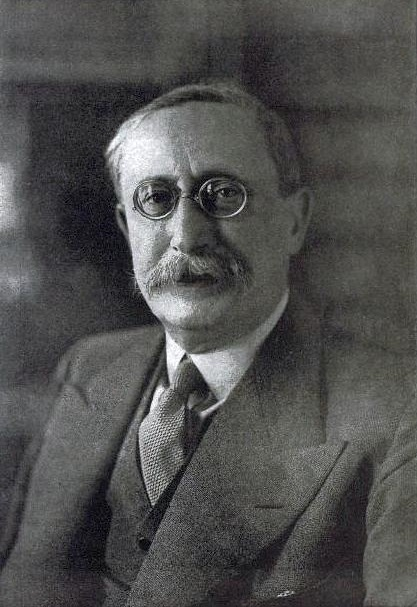
June 22, 1937: Chautemps replaces Blum as French Prime Minister.
- Camille Chautemps became Prime Minister of France for the third time.
- An espionage tribunal was established in the Spanish Republic with the primary task of putting members of POUM on trial.
- Two Soviet gun boats were reported to have attacked Manchukuo troops near Heiho, on the Amur River.
- Born: Chris Blackwell, British record producer, 2001 Rock and Roll Hall of Fame inductee who founded Island Records and popularized reggae music; in Westminster, London
- Died: Jean-Joseph Rabearivelo, 36, Malagasy author and Africa's first modern poet, committed suicide by swallowing potassium cyanide.

== June 23, 1937 (Wednesday) ==
- Hitler sent the strongest units of the Kriegsmarine toward Valencia for a "demonstration" after dropping out of the international neutral ship patrol for the second time, since Britain and France refused to allow Germany to secure satisfaction for an alleged Spanish submarine attack on the cruiser Leipzig. The government of the Second Spanish Republic warned that it would fight back if any power shelled a city within the Republic.
- The All India Football Federation (AIFF), governing body of soccer football in India, was founded in Shimla (at the time the summer capital of British India, located in the Punjab Province, by representatives of nine regional associations the Indian Football Association (IFA, serving the Bengal Province), Army Sports Control Board, North-West India Football Association, Bihar Olympic Association, Western India Football Association (WIFA, serving the Bombay Province, Madras Football Association, United Provinces Sports Control Board, Mysore Football Association, and Ajmer and Mewar Football Association.
- Born: Martti Ahtisaari, President of Finland from 1994 to 2000, and 2008 Nobel Peace Prize laureate; in Viipuri (d. 2023)

== June 24, 1937 (Thursday) ==
- Paul Robeson made an important speech on the Spanish Civil War at the Royal Albert Hall in London during a benefit to raise funds for Basque refugee children. "There is no standing above the conflict on Olympian heights. There are no impartial observers", Robeson said. "The liberation of Spain from the oppression of fascist reactionaries is not a private matter of the Spaniards, but the common cause of all advanced and progressive humanity."
  the new Liechtenstein flag

the Haiti flag

- The 8th Imperial Conference, which had opened on May 14 with the Prime Minister of the United Kingdom hosting the Prime Ministers of Canada, Australia, New Zealand, South Africa and Southern Rhodesia, the Secretary of State for India and the Chief Minister of Burma.
- The Principality of Liechtenstein added a crown to its national flag so that it would no longer be identical to the flag of Haiti, remedying a problem that had gone unnoticed until both nations had participated in the 1936 Summer Olympics.

== June 25, 1937 (Friday) ==
- An innovation by promoters of professional wrestling, the "steel cage match" made its debut
- Neville Chamberlain made his first major foreign policy speech as Prime Minister of the United Kingdom in the British House of Commons, advising against overly criticizing Germany's involvement in the Spanish Civil War because of the danger of a larger European war. "There are sometimes conditions to be found when an incautious move or even a sudden loud exclamation may start an avalanche," he said, adding "That is just the condition in which we are finding ourselves to-day. I believe, although the snow may be perilously poised it has not yet begun to move, and if we can all exercise caution, patience and self-restraint we may yet be able to save the peace of Europe."
- The historical adventure film Wee Willie Winkie, based on a novel by Rudyard Kipling and starring Shirley Temple and Victor McLaglen, premiered in Los Angeles.
- Born:
  - Nawaf Al-Ahmad Al-Jaber Al-Sabah, Emir of Kuwait from 2020 to 2023; in Kuwait City (d.2023)
  - Keizō Obuchi, Prime Minister of Japan from 1998 to 2000; in Nakanojō, Gunma Prefecture (d. 2000)
- Died: Colin Clive, 37, English film actor known for starring in Frankenstein and its 1935 sequel, Bride of Frankenstein, died of tuberculosis.

== June 26, 1937 (Saturday) ==
- The eleventh annual English Greyhound Derby was held at a track at the track at London's White City Stadium. It was won by Wattle Bark, who set a new record for fastest speed by running the 500 yards (460 m) in 29.26 seconds.
- Mary Pickford and Charles "Buddy" Rogers were married in a simple ceremony in Los Angeles.
- Born: Robert Coleman Richardson, American experimental physicist; in Washington, D.C. (d. 2013)

== June 27, 1937 (Sunday) ==
- Martin Niemöller gave what would be his last sermon in Nazi Germany, stating, "No more are we ready to keep silent at man's behest when God commands us to speak. For it is, and must remain, the case that we must obey God rather than man."
- Born:
  - Mehdi Hasan, Pakistani journalist and news agency chief; in Panipat, Punjab Province, British India (d.2022)
- Died:
  - Bertha Worms, 69, French-born Brazilian painter
  - Harold Heygate, 52, English cricketer best known for the 1919 "Heygate Incident" where he was a spectator recruited to play for Sussex in a first-cricket game

== June 28, 1937 (Monday) ==
- The Soviet Communist Party's Politburo issue a decree directing the creation of a three-member panel to determine which political prisoners in West Siberia should be executed as part of the Great Purge. The NKVD Order No. 00447 decree, titled "Regarding operations to repress former kulaks, criminals, and other anti-Soviet elements" was issued by NKVD Director Nikolai Yezhov on July 30, 1937. Robert Eikhe, a candidate member of the Communist Party's ruling Politburo, was appointed as the Party's representative with Sergei Mironov to make final approval over which of 26,000 defendants would be marked for execution.
- The new French Finance Minister Georges Bonnet addressed the country's financial crisis by closing the stock market and suspending all commercial payments in gold and foreign currencies until further notice.
- Béla Kun, who had founded the Communist Hungarian Soviet Republic in 1919 and served as its first leader, was arrested by the NKVD after being denounced as Trotskyite with anti-Soviet objectives. He would be executed in prison on August 29, 1938.
- The Soviet Union executed and additional 36 people who were convicted of espionage during the Great Purge.
- Born:
  - Ron Luciano, American baseball umpire; in Endicott, New York (d. 1995)
  - Charlie Flowers, American college football star and inductee to the College Football Hall of Fame; in Marianna, Arkansas (d.2014)
- Died: George Warren Russell, 83, New Zealand politician

== June 29, 1937 (Tuesday) ==
- The Spanish Nationalists occupied Balmaseda.
- Canadian Prime Minister William Lyon Mackenzie King had separate meetings with Hermann Göring and Adolf Hitler in Berlin. Mackenzie King's diary entry that day described Hitler as "a man of deep sincerity and a genuine patriot."
- The Lewiston–Auburn shoe strike, which had started on March 25, ended after three months without concessions to the strikers.
- Bronko Nagurski, an NFL star in professional football (and later inductee into the Pro Football Hall of Fame), won the world heavyweight pro wrestling championship at a bout in Minneapolis by defeating champion Dean Detton.

== June 30, 1937 (Wednesday) ==
- The first emergency telephone number in the world, 999 was inaugurated by the United Kingdom. While dialing the operator was a means of reaching help for an emergency, the 999 signal activated a buzzer and a red light at the switchboard to get immediate attention. The U.S. 911 system would not be inaugurated until more than 30 years later in 1968.
- Germany's Reichsminister of Church Affairs, Hanns Kerrl, decreed that the government would control all funds of Protestant churches. Thereafter, ministry officials oversaw all aspects of the churches' financial activities, from revenues collected during church services, and their expenditures including ministers' salaries.
- The record for highest altitude by a human being was broken as RAF Flight Lieutenant M.J. Adam reached 53,937 feet (16,440 m) flying a Bristol Type 138 over the United Kingdom.
- Portugal ceased cooperation with the Non-Intervention Committee patrol agreement, and ordered British observers off its soil.
- To celebrate the anniversary of the 1910 founding of the Boy Scouts of America, the BSA's first National Jamboree opened in Washington D.C., with 25,000 scouts camping out on the grounds of the National Mall. The event closed on July 9.
- Franklin Delano Roosevelt, Jr., son of the President of the United States, and Ethel du Pont, heiress to the du Pont family fortune, were married in Wilmington, Delaware in the American society wedding of the decade.
- Born:
  - Noel Black, American film and television director, screenwriter and producer; in Chicago (d. 2014)
  - Dinkar Joshi, Indian novelist; in Bhadi Bhandaria, Bombay Province, British India (now Gujarat state)
  - Larry Henley, American songwriter best known for penning the lyrics of "Wind Beneath My Wings"; in Odessa, Texas (d. 2014)
  - Warren John Nutter, American murderer (d. 2021)
- Died: Frank A. Vanderlip, 72, American banker known for the founding of the U.S. Federal Reserve System, for serving as the president of the National City Bank of New York (now Citibank from 1909 to 1919, and for introducing the Montessori school to the United States.
