= 1937 Coppa Italia final =

3rd Coppa Italia final
- Event: 1936–37 Coppa Italia
Genova 1893	Roma
1	0
- Date: 6 June 1937
- Venue: Stadio Comunale Giovanni Berta, Florence
- Referee: Francesco Mattea

The 1937 Coppa Italia final was played on 6 June 1937 between Genova 1893 and Roma. Genoa won 1–0.

== Match ==
6 June 1937

Genova 1893	1–0	Roma
Torti 79'

Stadio Comunale Giovanni Berta, Florence
Referee: Francesco Mattea

Genova 1893	Roma

GK	1	(Italy) Manlio Bacigalupo
DF	2	(Italy) Paolo Agosteo
DF	3	(Italy) Mario Genta
MF	4	(Italy) Pietro Pastorino
MF	5	(Italy) Giuseppe Bigogno
MF	6	(Italy) Emanuel Fillola
FW	7	(Italy) Sante Pietro Arcari III
FW	8	(Italy) Mario Perazzolo
FW	9	(Italy) Luigi Torti
FW	10	(Italy) Luigi Scarabello
FW	11	(Italy) Alfredo Marchionneschi
Manager:
(Austria) Hermann Felsner

GK	1	(Italy) Cesare Valinasso
DF	2	(Italy) Eraldo Monzeglio
DF	3	(Italy) Luigi Allemandi
MF	4	(Italy) Evaristo Frisoni
MF	5	(Italy) Fulvio Bernardini
MF	6	(Italy) Andrea Gadaldi
FW	7	(Italy) Amedeo Amadei
FW	8	(Italy) Pietro Serantoni
FW	9	(Italy) Dante Di Benedetti
FW	10	(Italy) Alfredo Mazzoni
FW	11	(Italy) Ernesto Tomasi
Manager:
(Italy) Luigi Barbesino
