= Geibeltbad Pirna =

Public bath and water sport facility in Pirna near Dresden, Saxony in Germany

Coordinates: 50.946018°N 13.940674°E

- Company type: Private company limited by shares
- Industry: Restaurants, Wellness, Sport, Gastronomy
- Founded: 20 June 1937; 88 years ago
- Headquarters: Pirna
- Area served: Dresden
- Key people: Olaf Schwarze (General Manager)
- Number of employees: c. 25
- Website: geibeltbad-pirna.de

The Geibeltbad Pirna is a public bath and water sport facility in Pirna near Dresden, Saxony in Germany. Finished under the Nazis on June 20, 1937, it is one of the largest baths in the world. Completely paid by the Anna Marie Geibelt Foundation (House of Wettin Royalists) and constructed on a her mud area, between April - June 20, 1937 (three months construction only). The foundation got its inspiration from the International Hygiene Exhibition, were the public bath in that new form had been invented. The 20,000 square metre site was renovated and upgraded in 2001-02 to include an indoor swimming pool, wellness centre and other facilities. From 1937 to 1990 Geibeltbad was a venue for the German swimming championships as well as a training site. In 2006, the bath welcomed 233,588 visitors.

== Location ==
Pirna is located in a wooded valley between Viehleite and Kohlberg and can be reached by taking a thirty-minute train ride from Dresden on the Dresden S-Bahn "S1" followed by a ten-minute bus trip on the Neundorf (Pirna) "N-Line" to the Geibeltbad stop.

== Structure after modification 1999 since 2002 ==
=== Outdoor pools ===
There is a 8 by 50 metres (26 ft × 164 ft) open air pool, a non-swimmer pool (250 m ³), a 10 m tower with 1 m, 3 m and 5 m stages with a diving pool with 850 m ³ capacity. In addition in the east part and western part are paddling pools for children.

In addition there are cabin wings, which extend between old and new entrances in the style of the 1930s. Several playgrounds are available, such as "Gacetto", spider, sliding pole, table tennis and 2 match-fair Beach volleyball places. At the end of August the Saxonia championships are held here.

In addition the exterior installation has a capacity for approximately 5000 visitors. The external pools are all heatable. At warm periods in summer up to 2500 visitors are expected. On the former meadow is a paddle pool and a mud pool for children. The paddle pool includes fountains.

=== The leisure time bath ===
The leisure time bath is at the same time indoor swimming bath, wellness bath and sauna bath. The pool is 25 m long.

It has a 34 °C and a 15 °C basins. The nonswimmer basin has massage druses and neck emitters. Then there is still another steam sauna, what has the characteristic to lies in the bath central and openly. The giant chute is manufactured from high-grade steel and it can see from the inside into the outside. It has also a water playground. From the interior may be swim also after outside; into the 32° warm external basin. From there can be go also to the free bath. This happens with the "Coin", which is worth 40 euros.

=== Sauna ===
There are 6 different saunas in the Geibeltbath Pirna. It accommodates two dry saunas (80 °C - 100°C), a low temperature sauna with 50 °C - 60 °C, a tepidarium with 30 °C -45 °C and a Finnish Kelo Sauna with 500-year-old pine wood. There are two types of steam saunas, with 100% air humidity, 40 °C - 45 °C and a brine inhalation bath with steam temperature of 45 °C. Medicinal herbs are included. Then there is a health spa where mud can be applied. The mud consists of algae and chalk.

In the Tepidarium are heated areas with warm and cold water pools and rest areas. A bar is available in this area.

=== Gastronomy ===
There is a restaurant at the main entrance and a snack terrace in the outdoor pool, both of which have a good view. There is a vitamin drink bar in the tepidarium.

== Courses ==
First logo (2002-2021)

Monday to Thursday children training is available starting from 6 years old. The course is for 14 days (8 training days altogether).

Swimming gymnastics is available as a training course. For sports training "Aqua-Power" in on offer.

== Events ==
Outside of the summer season on every first Monday of the month is a nude swimming session from 22:00 am - 2.00 pm at the leisure time pool.

There is a midnight sauna and night swimming in the winter months, every first Saturday of the month from 10pm until 2am.

== Facilities ==
There is a restaurant at the main entrance, the snack bar at the exterior bath and a bar at the tepidarium. The restaurant is for all visitors.

The spa had its own shuttle service to Dresden and Heidenau.

== Awards ==
- IOC/IAKS Award 2005
- German championships 1950
- Movie location as "Bad Johannstadt / Bath of Dresden-Johannstadt" district) of the Tatort "Déjà-vu" (about a pedophile murderer of a boy at 28min 5sec) 2017.

== Gallery ==
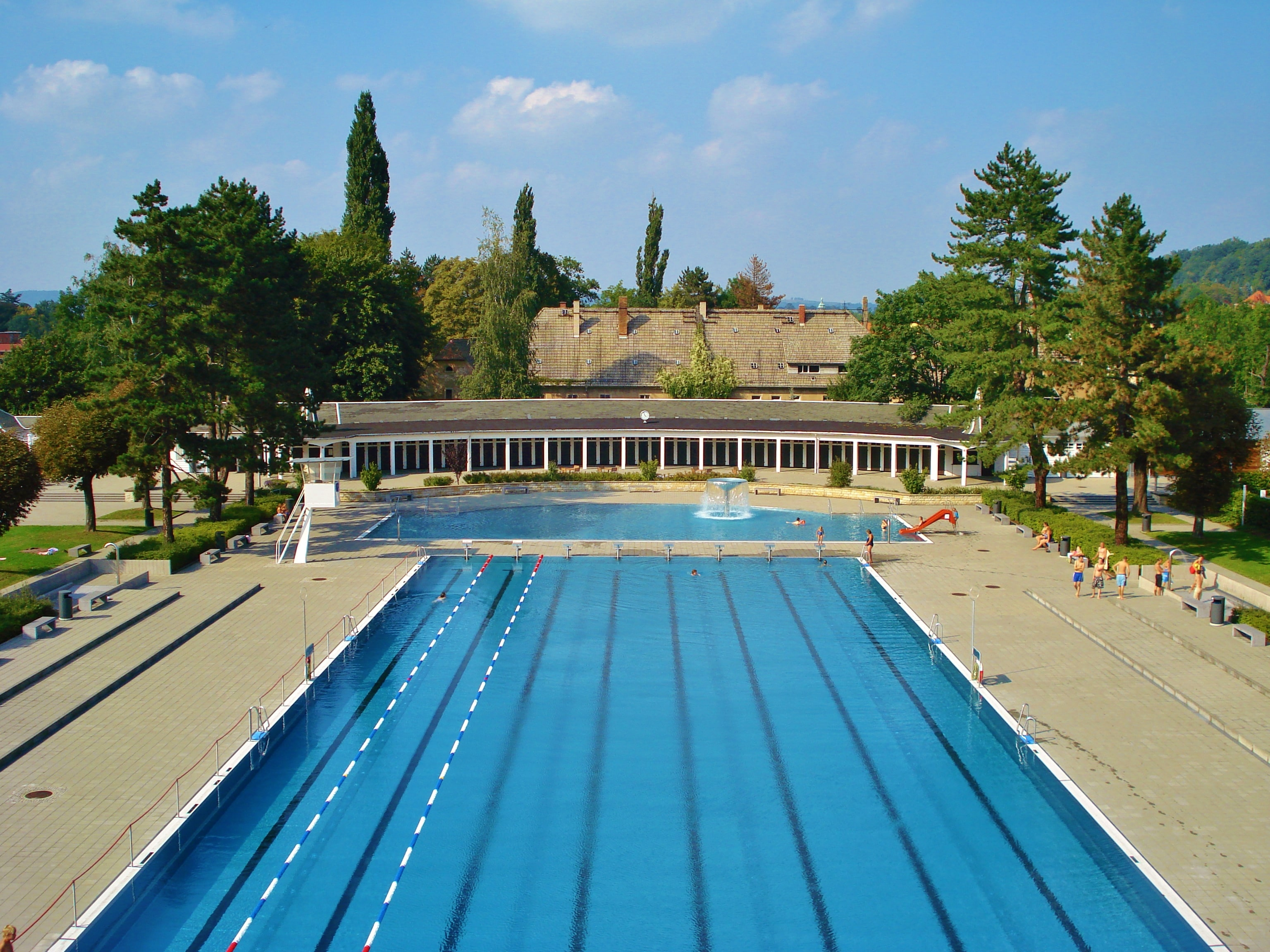

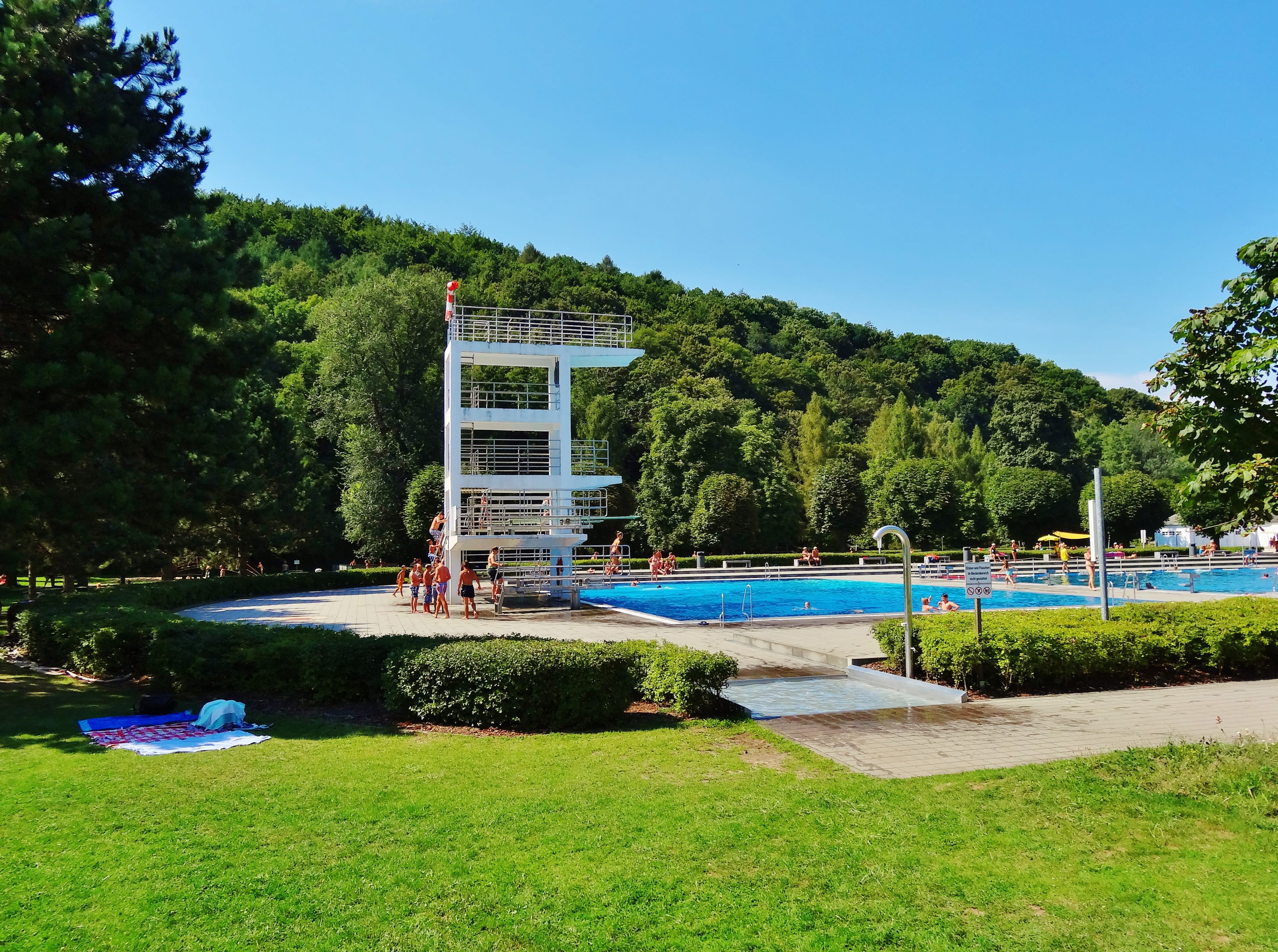

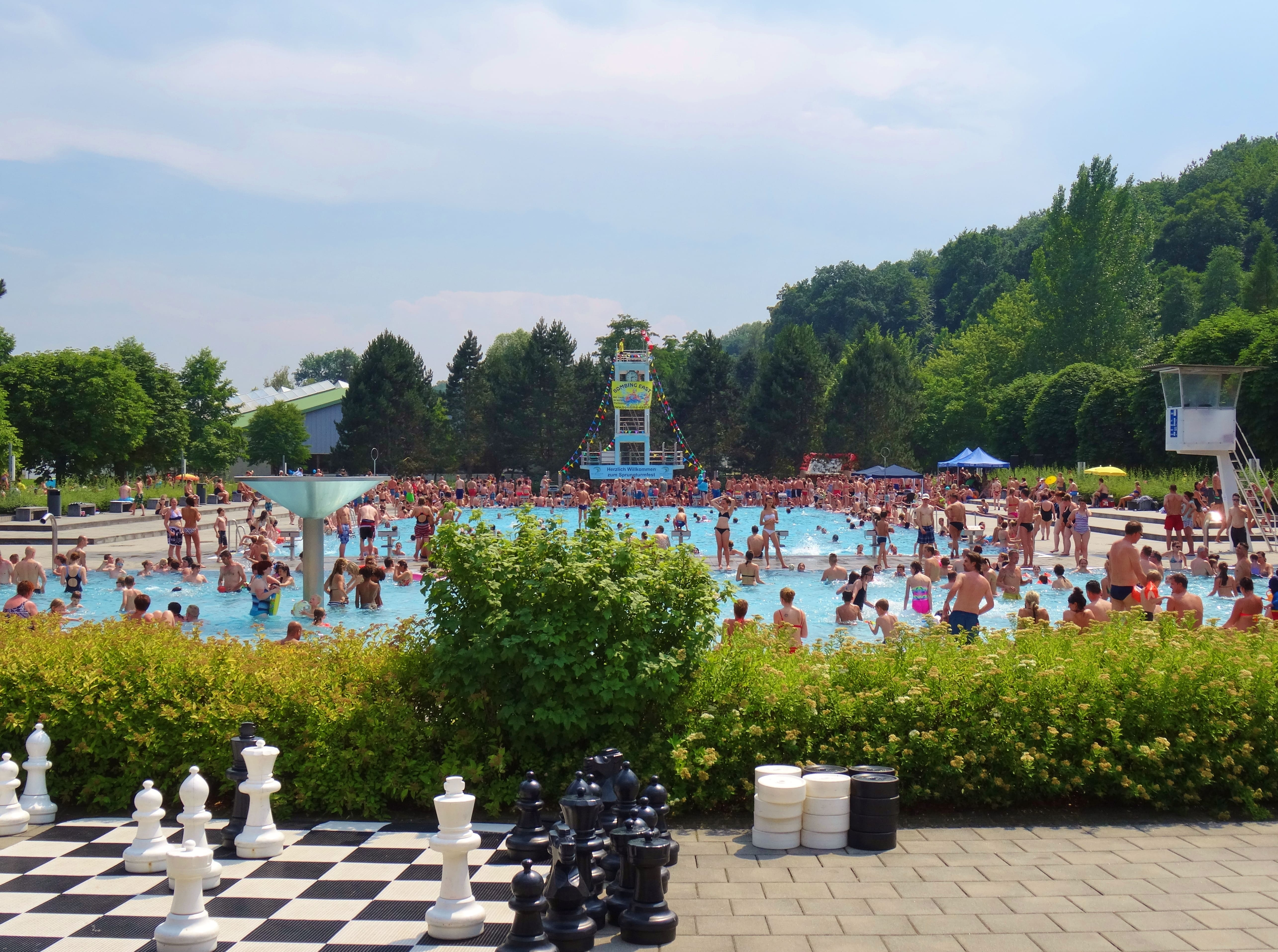

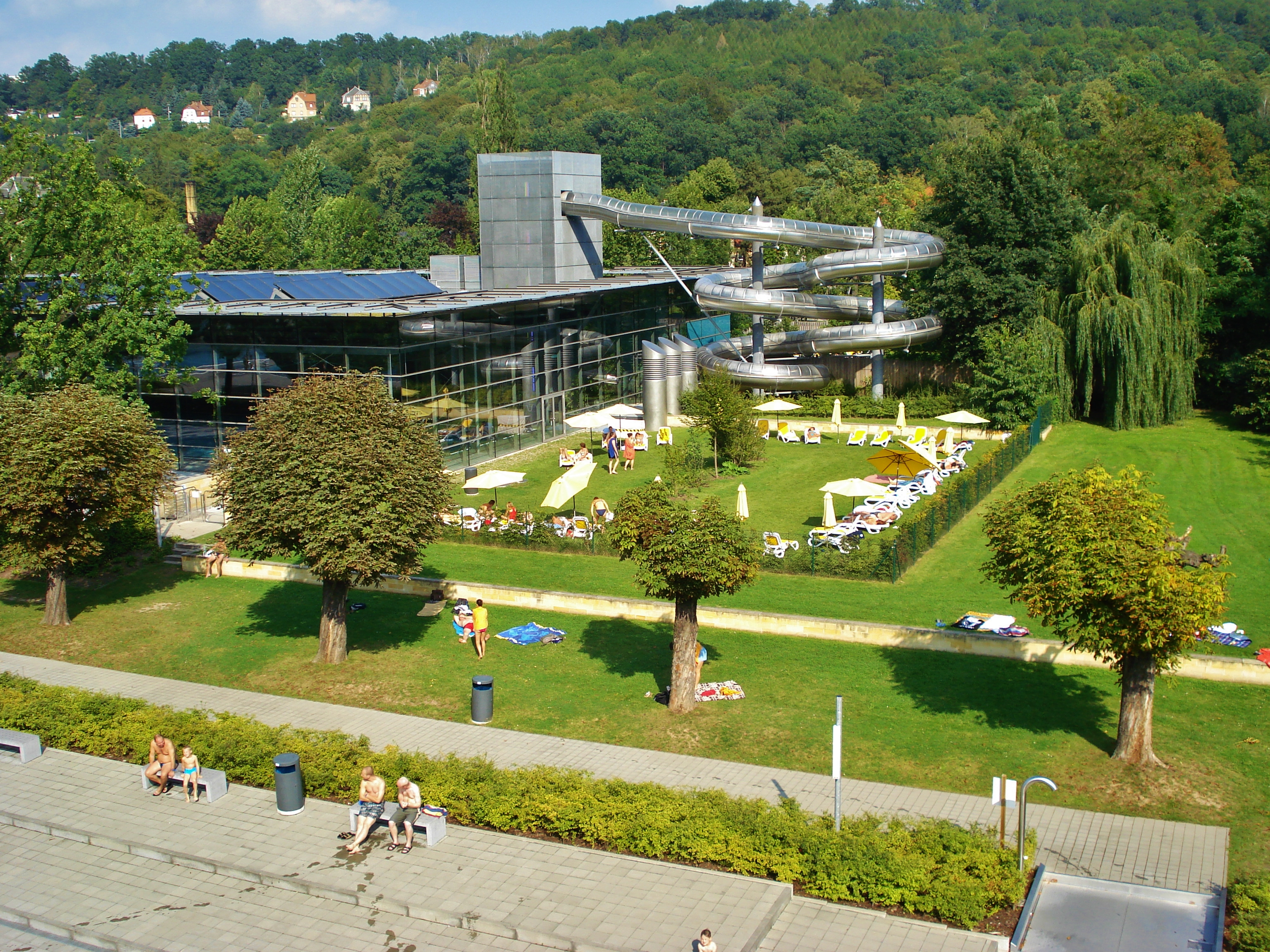

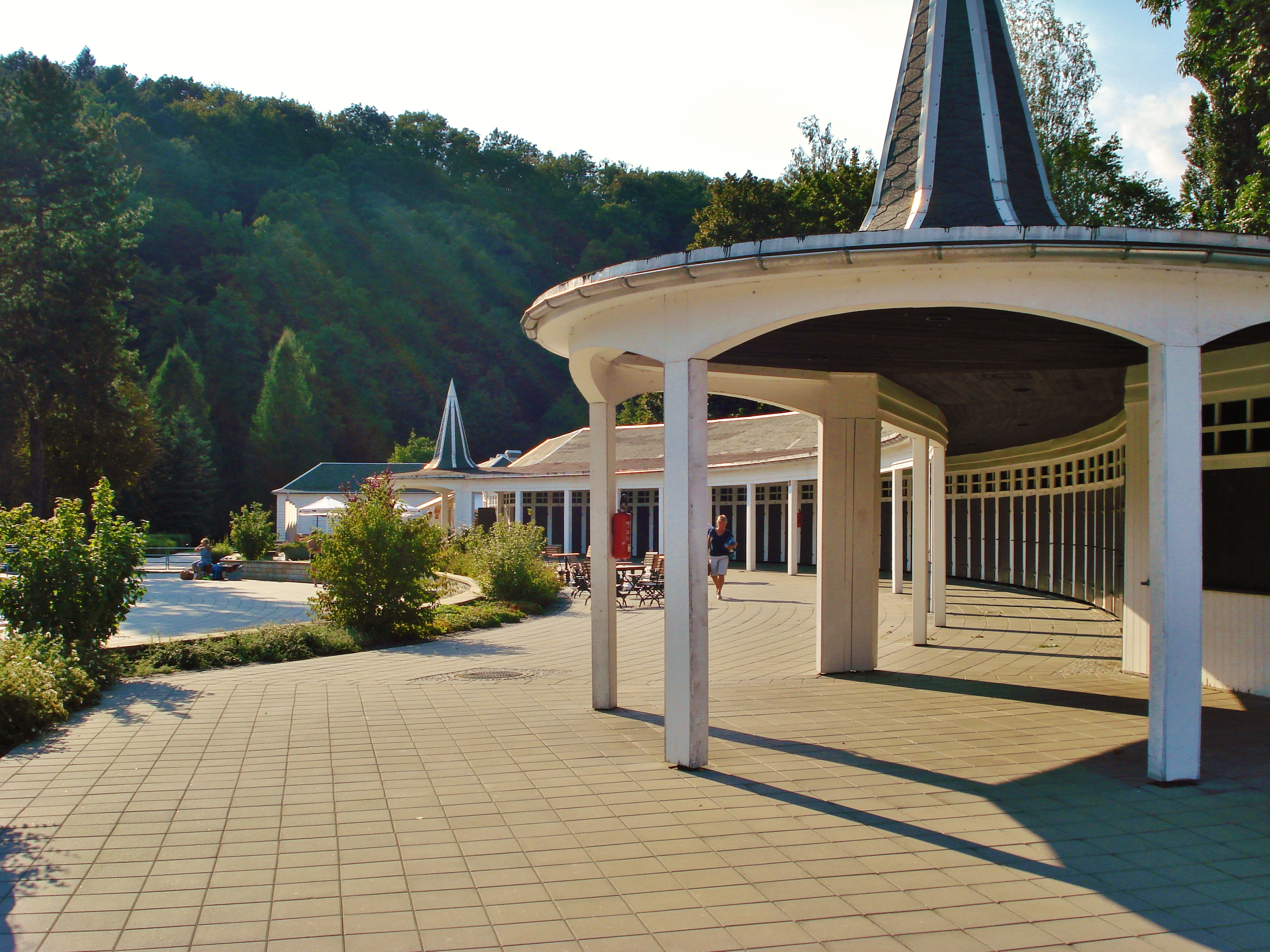

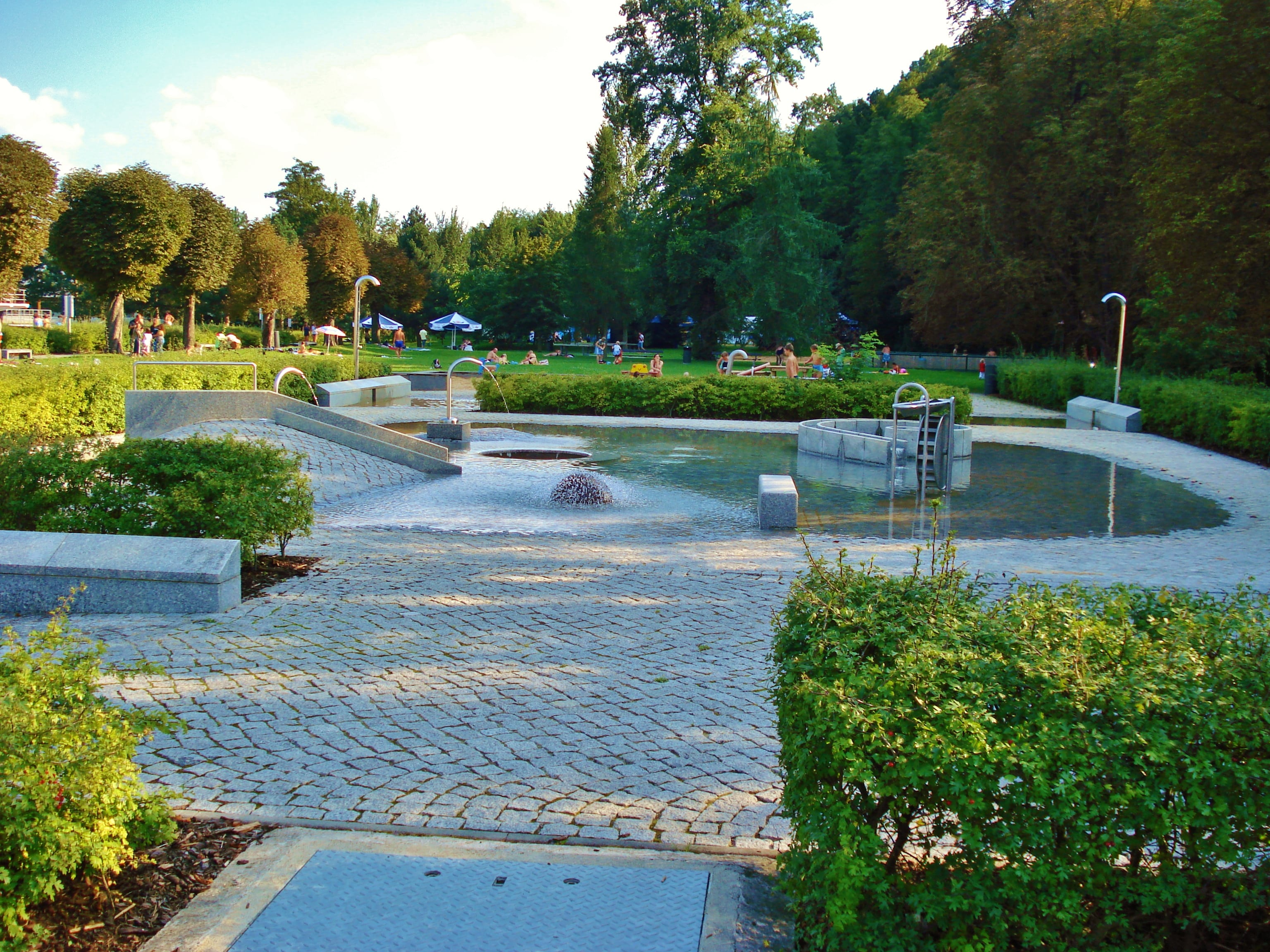

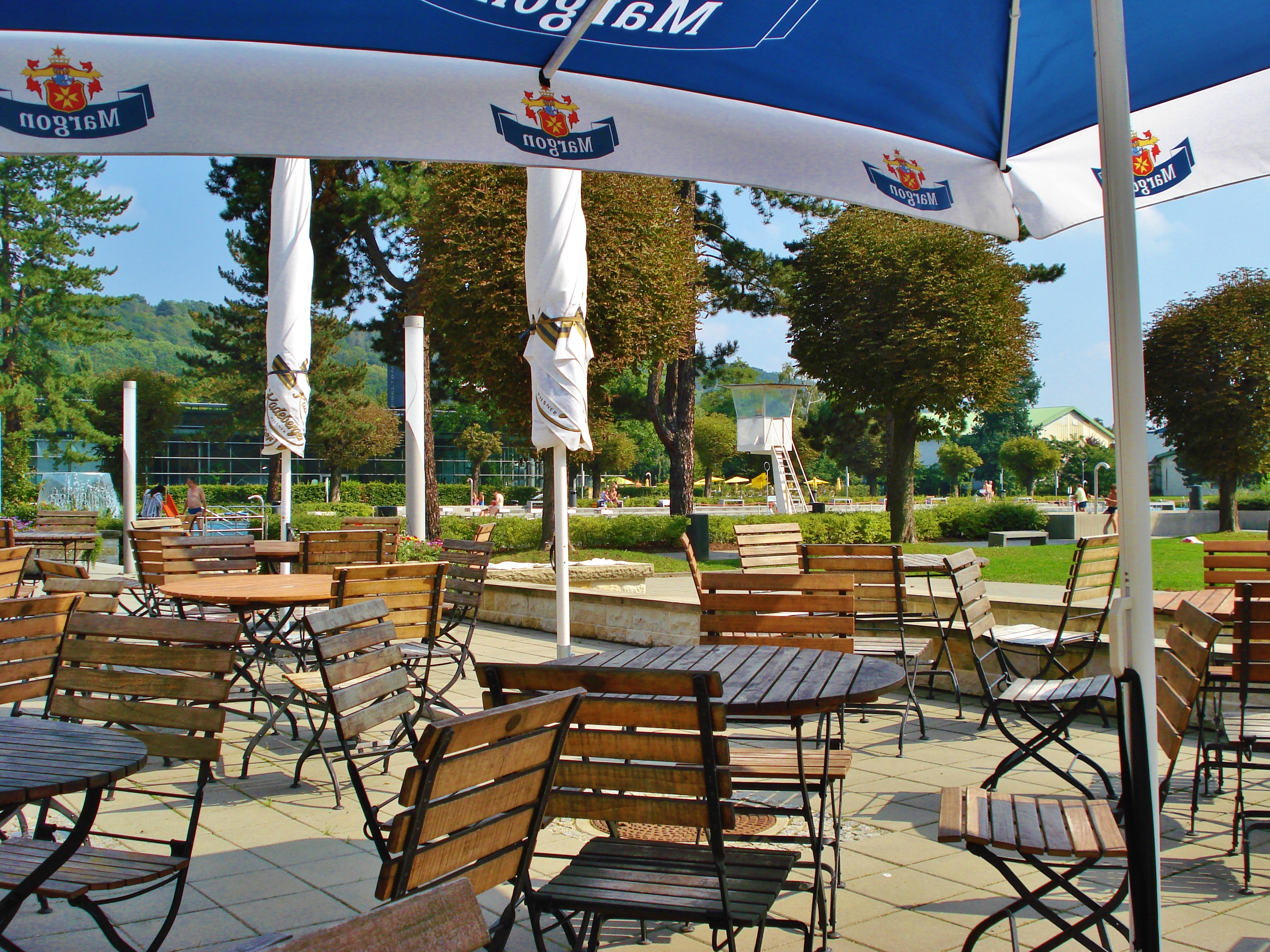

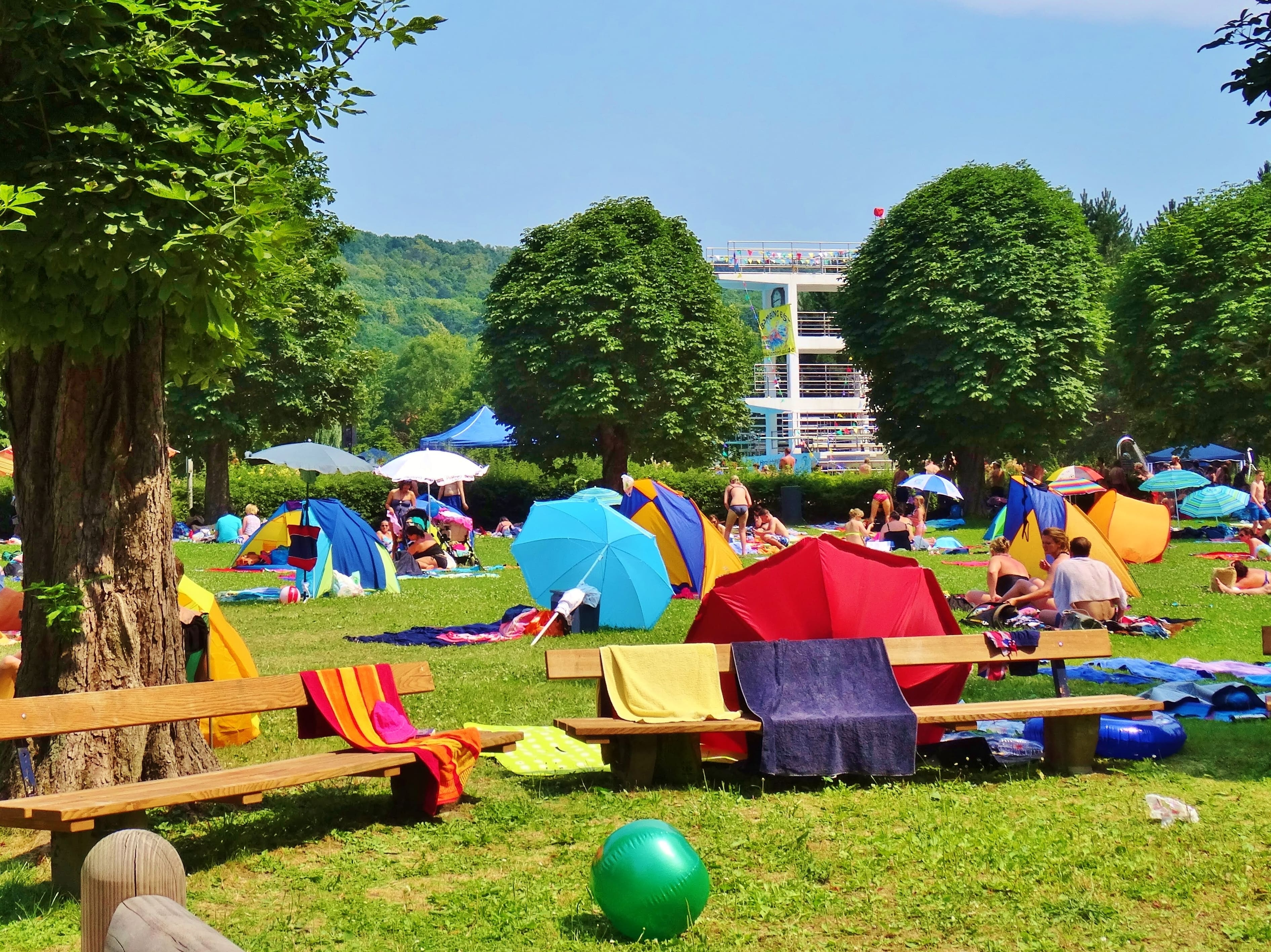

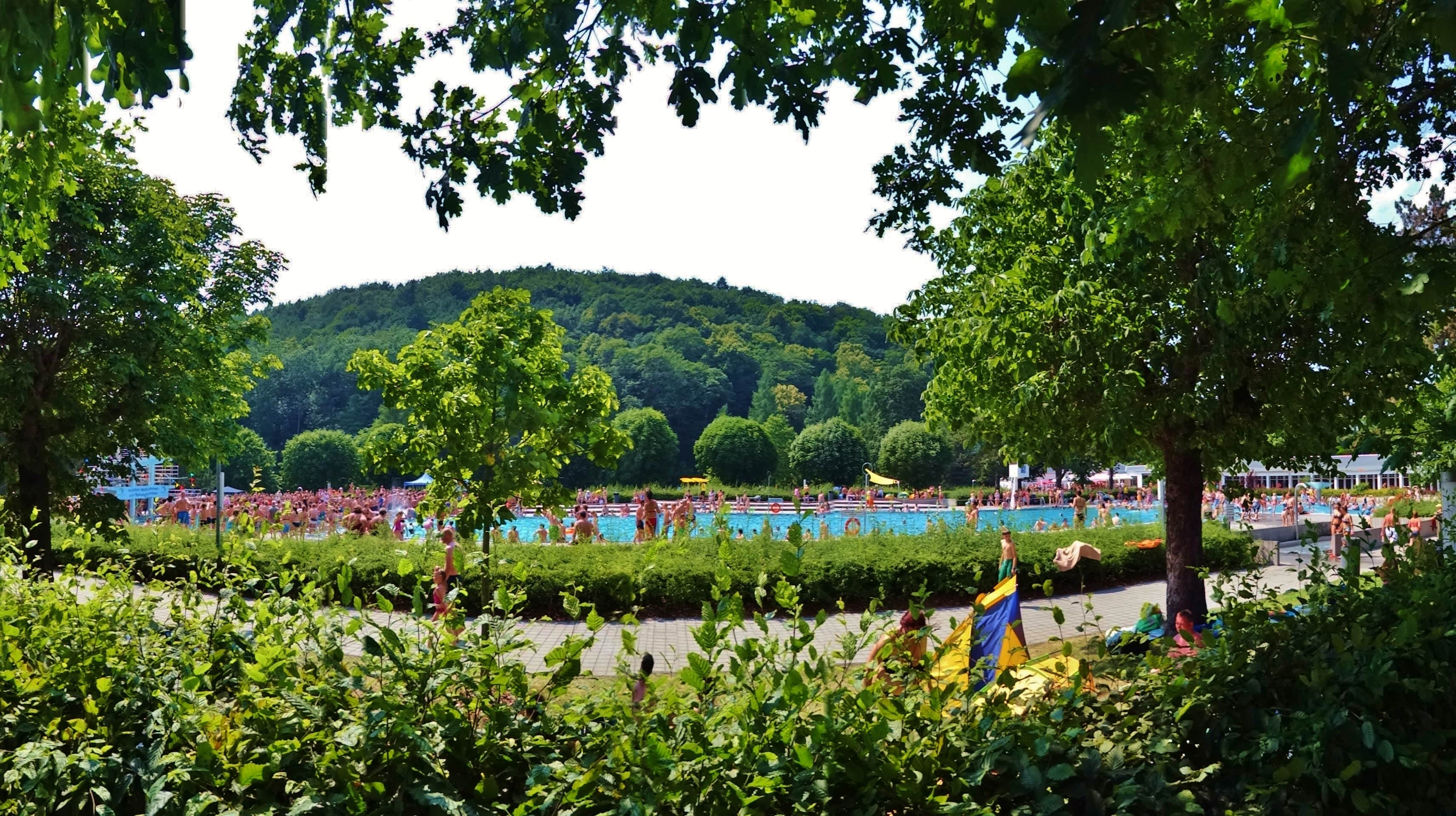

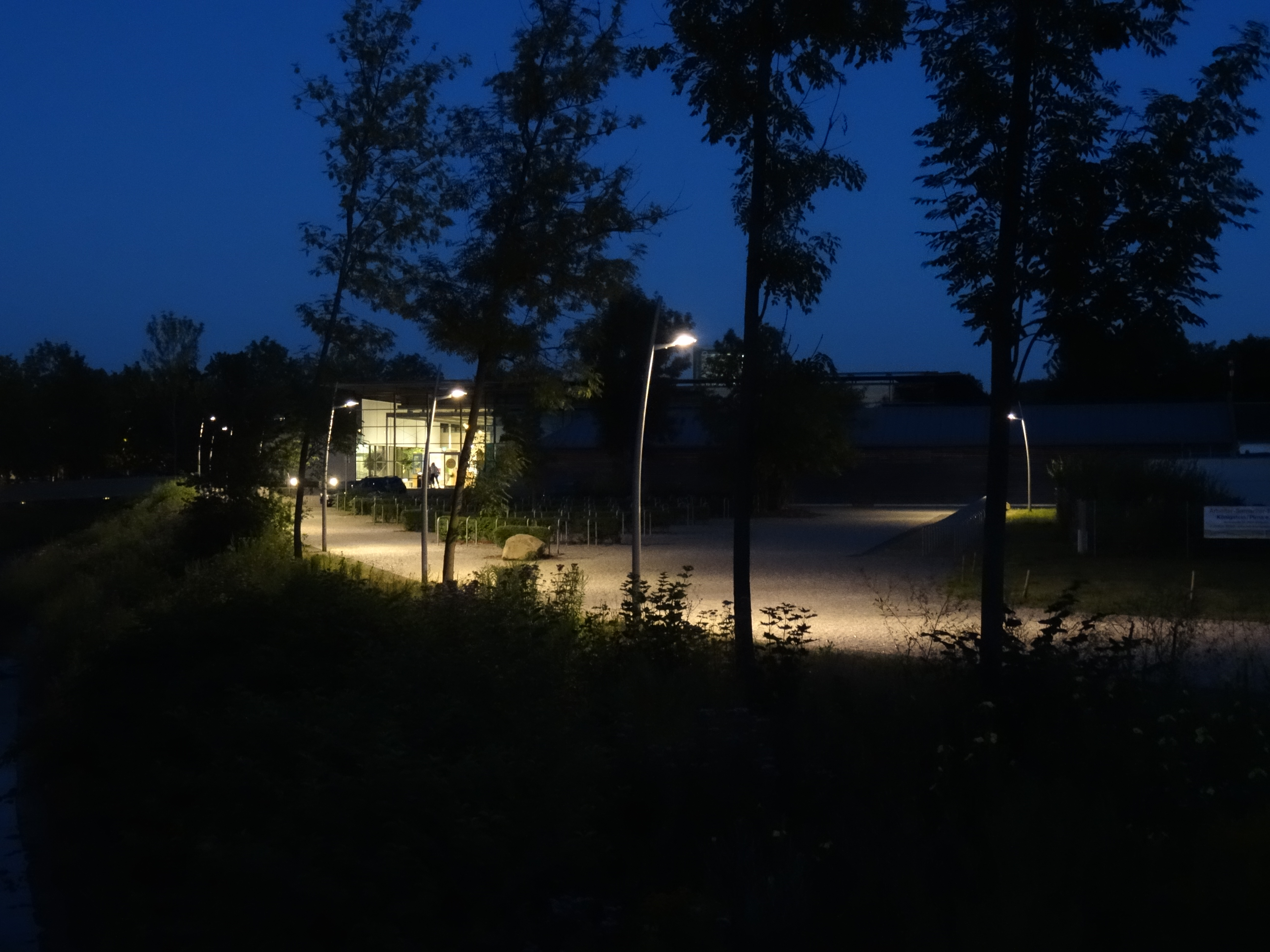

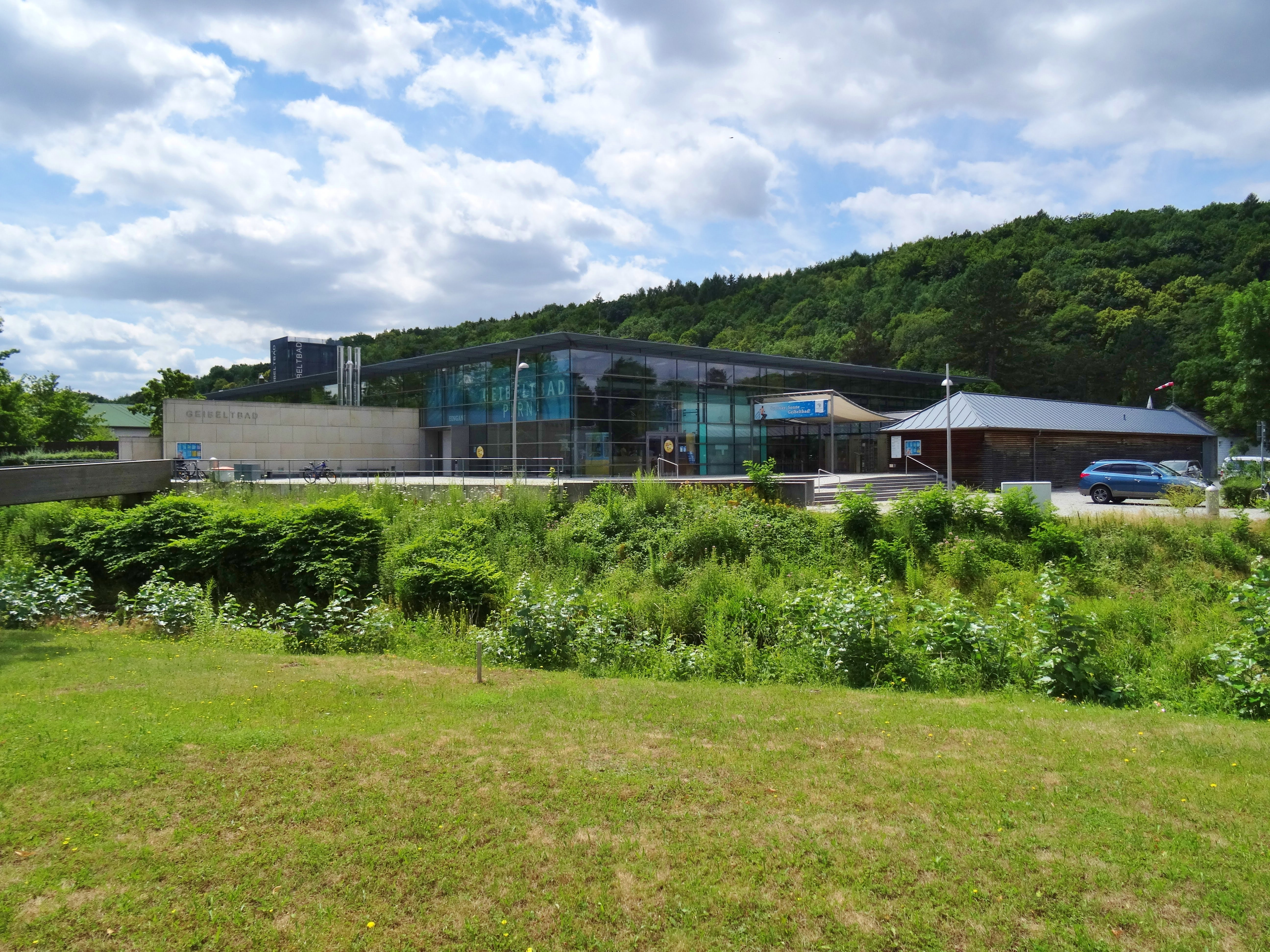

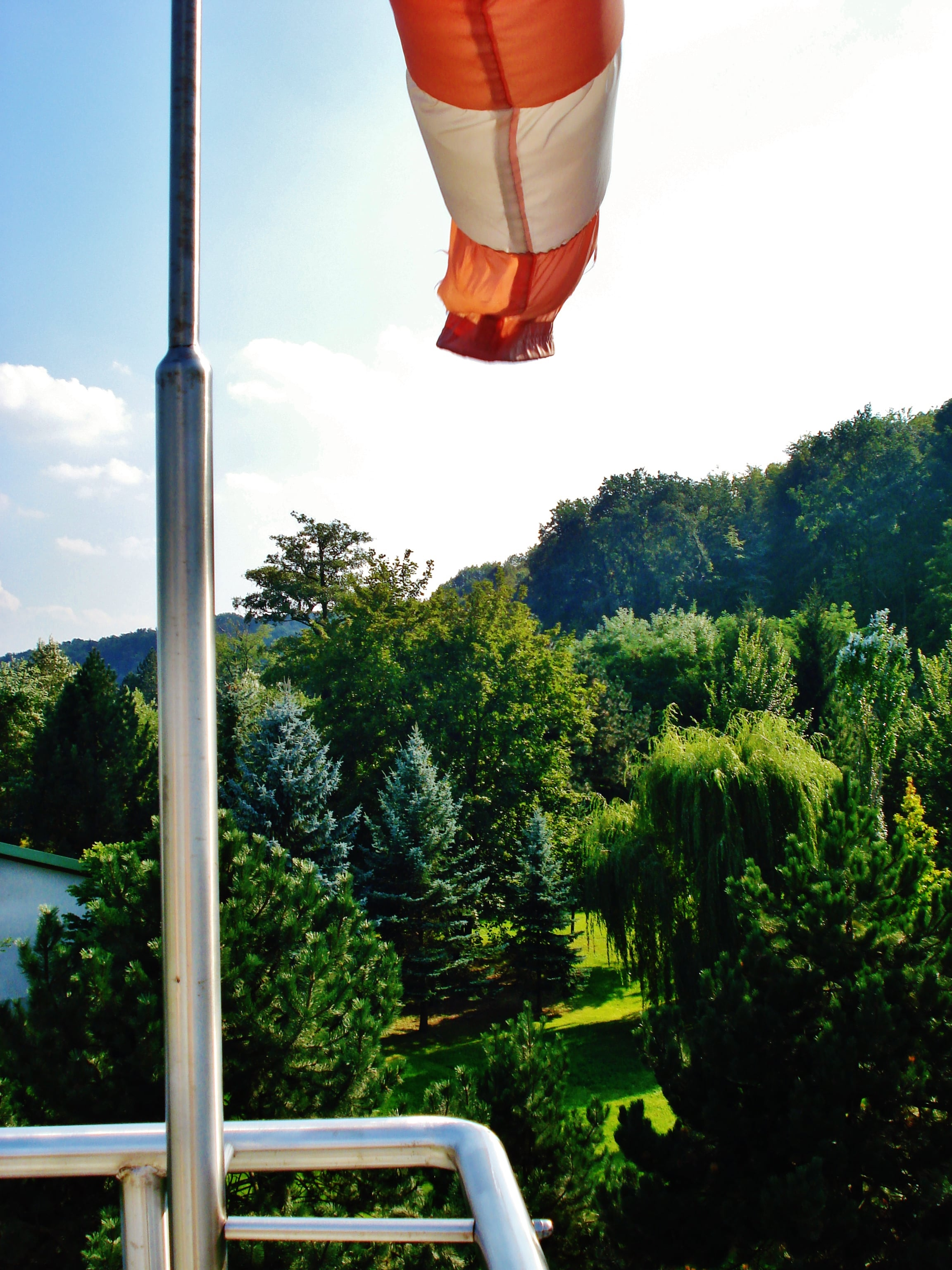

== See also ==
Olympic-size swimming pool
