= Paolo Agosteo =

Italian footballer

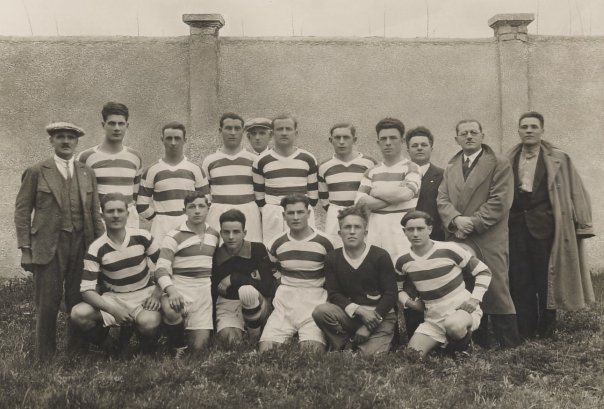
- The Aurora Pro Patria 1919 team in the 1928-29 season. From left, standing: Bekey (coach), Bocchi, Bonivento, Fizzotti, Rosanna, Borsani, Carlo Reguzzoni, Gregar, Caimi, Marcora (president), Giuseppe Reguzzoni; squatting: Agosteo, Colombo, Moltrasio, Giani, Speroni, Crosta.

Personal information
- Date of birth: 27 November 1908
- Place of birth: Catania, Italy
- Height: 1.82 m (5 ft 11 1/2 in)
- Position: Defender

Senior career*
Years	Team	Apps	(Gls)
1927–1928	Pavia		
1928–1933	Pro Patria	124	(1)
1933–1935	Ambrosiana-Inter	59	(7)
1935–1938	Genova 1893	70	(3)
1938–1939	Lazio	0	(0)
1939–1941	Alba Roma		
- * Club domestic league appearances and goals

Paolo Agosteo (born 27 November 1908) was a professional Italian football player.

== Honours ==
- Coppa Italia winner: 1936/37.
