= Printer's Devilry =

Form of cryptic crossword

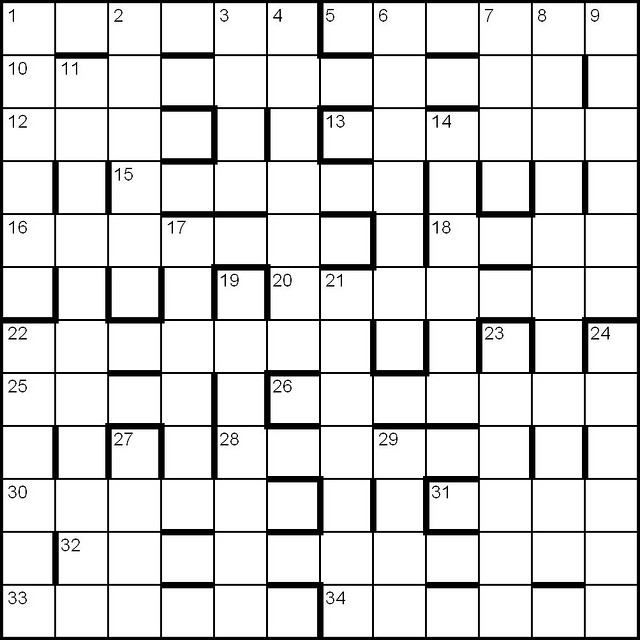
A barred grid, the kind used by Ximenes and Azed in their puzzles

A Printer's Devilry is a form of cryptic crossword puzzle, first invented by Afrit (Alistair Ferguson Ritchie) in 1937. A Printer's Devilry puzzle does not follow the standard Ximenean rules of crossword setting, since the clues do not define the answers. Instead, each clue consists of a sentence from which a string of letters has been removed and, where necessary, the punctuation and word breaks in the clue rearranged to form a new more-or-less grammatical sentence. The challenge to the solver is to find the missing letters, which will spell out a word or phrase that should be entered into the grid.

== History ==
Afrit's first Printer's Devilry puzzle appeared in The Listener on 2 June, 1937 in puzzle 377. Its original preamble, setting out the rules, read as follows:

The lights are complete words which were originally 'hidden' in the clues. It is to be assumed that the compositor, seeing that certain consecutive letters spelt a word or words, removed them and closed up the gap, sometimes taking a further liberty with the spacing and punctuation, but not altering the order of the letters. There is only one break in each clue, and the lights show the omitted letters in their original order.

— Afrit

Other later crossword setters have picked up the form, including Ximenes and Azed, and it has also found use in mixed puzzles that combine several different clue types on a single grid. Ximenes noted that it was one of the most popular non-plain puzzle types and typically set a Printer's Devilry every eight months, while most other puzzle types only appeared annually. The name plays on the term printer's devil, an old term for a printer's apprentice.

== Examples ==
Like a standard cryptic crossword clue, the surface reading of a Printer's Devilry clue has nothing to do with the answer. However, a cryptic crossword clue according to Ximenean rules comprises wordplay and a definition. Neither of these are present in a Printer's Devilry. For example, in the following clue:

A galling remark – an effective riposte is difficult (7)

— Azed, 1,888

the correct answer is INSTATE, which can be slotted into the clue to form a new sentence: "Against a telling remark, an effective riposte is difficult". To produce this sentence, a space is deleted between "a" and "galling", two spaces are added into "instate" and the dash is replaced by a comma.

In his analysis of Printer's Devilry clues, Ximenes noted that it was a popular type, arguably easier than the standard cryptic but with the potential to be made more difficult by concealing the position of the break. A difficult Printer's Devilry clue can therefore involve substantial changes to the structure of the sentence, not just the addition of the clue word, as in:

"When he was dancing at the center, I could not see Jose like Tex," pens Esther. "'E were too high." (8)

— Bernard Lacy, New York Magazine volume 3 issue 4

which must be significantly adjusted to produce the sentence: "When he was dancing at the center, I could not see Jose Limon as ticket expenses there were too high" with the clue word MONASTIC.

However, the letters of the clued word always appear in order, and they always appear consecutively – the sentence is only ever broken in a single place.

In Printer's Devilry clues, the surface can be ungrammatical or nonsensical, but the complete sentence should always be logical and natural. A common mistake when setting Printer's Devilry clues is to do the reverse and contrive a sentence which reads naturally on its surface, but which when combined with the answer produces a sentence that is not idiomatic and therefore is impossible to guess. An example of this, criticized by Ximenes, is:

Do all the lines of travel cross in Galway? Slack supervision (6)

— Ximenes slip 525

The answer to this clue is MORALE, producing the sentence "Do all the lines of tram or a level crossing always lack supervision?" – a sentence Ximenes described as "so unnatural that the clue would be almost insoluble". It is also considered poor form for the break to appear at the beginning or end of a word.
