= Andrea Gadaldi =

Italian footballer and coach (1907-1993)

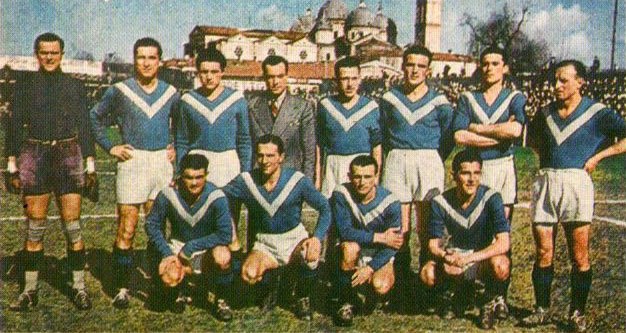

Personal information
- Date of birth: August 25, 1907
- Place of birth: Leno, Italy
- Date of death: January 16, 1993 (aged 85)
- Place of death: Brescia, Italy
- Height: 1.78 m (5 ft 10 in)
- Position: Defender

Senior career*
Years	Team	Apps	(Gls)
1925–1933	Brescia	155	(1)
1933–1940	Roma	180	(3)
1940–1942	Brescia	51	(1)

Managerial career
- 1947–1948: Brescia
- 1960: Brescia
- * Club domestic league appearances and goals

Andrea Gadaldi (August 25, 1907 – January 16, 1993) was an Italian professional football player and coach.

He played for 10 seasons (271 games, 4 goals) in the Serie A for Brescia Calcio and A.S. Roma.
