= Evaristo Frisoni =

Italian footballer (born 1907)

Personal information
- Date of birth: October 1, 1907
- Place of birth: Brescia, Italy
- Height: 1.69 m (5 ft 6 1/2 in)
- Position: Midfielder

Senior career*
Years	Team	Apps	(Gls)
1925–1934	Brescia	188	(32)
1934–1938	Roma	103	(4)
1938–1941	Brescia	76	(8)
- * Club domestic league appearances and goals

Evaristo Frisoni (born October 1, 1907) was an Italian professional football player. Frisoni played for 8 seasons (207 games, 21 goals) in the Serie A for both Brescia Calcio and A.S. Roma.

His older brother, Berardo Frisoni, also played football professionally. To distinguish them, Berardo was referred to as Frisoni I and Evaristo as Frisoni II. He is the father of Walter Frisoni.
