= Alistair Ferguson Ritchie =

British crossword compiler (1890–1954)

Alistair Ferguson Ritchie (1890–1954) was a crossword compiler, under the pseudonym Afrit. The son of a post office clerk, he was born in 1890 and brought up in King's Lynn. He was head boy at King Edward VII Grammar School there and graduated from Queens' College, Cambridge in 1911.

He trained for Holy Orders at Bishop's Hostel, Liverpool and was ordained deacon in 1912, and priest in 1913 . From 1912 to 1918 he was curate at St Paul's church, Southport and from 1918 to 1924 he was St Mary's church, Waterloo and also an assistant master at Merchant Taylors' School, Crosby. From there he went to Wells as Head of the Cathedral School and also as a priest vicar at the cathedral. He resigned as Priest Vicar in 1935 as the growing school needed his full attention.

In 1946 he was made a prebendary (honorary canon) of Wells Cathedral in recognition of his service to Wells and the diocese. In 1920 he married, Violet Minett who also taught at Merchant Taylor's, Crosby, and they had four children. He died in harness on 8 April 1954, aged 63, prompting a letter to The Times.

He was a sportsman in his youth and besides crosswords, his interests included book-binding and bee-keeping. He was a remarkable croquet player and the Wells Cathedral School still maintains his croquet lawn. At the school he kept bees in what had been the 'laundry garden'. When the bees took the garden over he persuaded volunteers to help take care of them. It seemed to the pupils that the volunteers emerged unscathed, whereas the headmaster, despite cloaking himself in hats and veils, always managed to get stung.

Recalling the headmaster's crossword expertise, one student related the headmaster saying to him, "Congratulations, you won the Observer crossword prize last week. Would you be good enough to let me have it some time?" Ritchie, who could no longer enter under his own name, had exhausted all the names of the members of staff and was now using those of members of the sixth form.

The puzzles of Afrit (his pen name, a powerful demon of Arabian mythology, which happened to be hidden in his initials and surname) first appeared in The Sketch and The Listener. For the Listener he compiled 127 crosswords from 1932 to 1948. These were usually impossibly difficult, often securing no correct entries. At The Listener he created several enduring formats of variety puzzle, including the popular Playfair and Printer's Devilry types. Later he composed easier puzzles for the Sphere and a collection of his Armchair Crosswords was published in 1949, considered a classic in the crossword world.

Afrit's book Armchair Crosswords was republished in 2009 by Rendezvous Press.
