= Bert Pearl =

Canadian radio entertainer

- Born: Bert Shapira; 2 February 1913; Winnipeg, Manitoba, Canada
- Died: 17 June 1986 (aged 73); Los Angeles, California, United States
- Occupations: Radio entertainer, singer, pianist, writer
- Known for: Founder and emcee of The Happy Gang

Bert Pearl (born Bert Shapira; 2 February 1913 – 17 June 1986) was a Canadian radio entertainer, singer, pianist and writer. He was best known as the founder, pianist and master of ceremonies of the CBC Radio variety program The Happy Gang. The program was broadcast for more than 20 years and Pearl was described by United Press International as one of Canada's major radio stars from the 1930s to the 1950s. He later moved to Hollywood, where he worked as a musical co-ordinator and writer of special material for television programs associated with Jimmy Durante and Gisele MacKenzie.

== Early life ==
Pearl was born Bert Shapira in Winnipeg, Manitoba, on 2 February 1913 to Boruch and Dina. He attended Aberdeen School and St. John’s High School before enrolling in pre-medical studies at the University of Manitoba on an Isbister scholarship. He moved to Toronto during the Great Depression, intending to earn money to continue his medical education, but instead found work in broadcasting with the Canadian Broadcasting Corporation.

== Career ==
=== Early broadcasting work ===
Pearl began his broadcasting career in Winnipeg at CKY, where he was hired for a variety program featuring local performers. In 1935, he moved to Toronto, which was becoming a centre for Canadian network broadcasting. His work as a pianist and performer led to regular CBC employment.

=== The Happy Gang ===
In 1937, CBC regional program director George Taggart was assigned to develop a weekday half-hour variety program. Pearl was chosen to lead the group and serve as master of ceremonies; the original musicians included Pearl, trumpeter Robert Farnon, violinist Blain Mathé and organist Kathleen Stokes. Herb May became the program’s first regular announcer, and George Temple was appointed producer. The program debuted on 14 June 1937 and became known as The Happy Gang.

Pearl’s on-air introduction described him as “that slap-happy chappy, the Happy Gang’s own pappy”. The program combined light music, comedy, sentimental songs and audience-friendly banter, and was broadcast across Canada by CBC and private stations on the network. The Canadian Communications Foundation states that the program reached about two million listeners and led the national ratings for much of its run.

The program’s opening and closing theme, originally a parody of the 1917 song “Smiles”, was later replaced by the original song “Keep Happy With the Happy Gang”. The Canadian Encyclopedia and a later article by Alan Redway state that Pearl wrote the theme.

Although the program projected cheerfulness, Pearl took a serious approach to planning and presenting the show, including programs geared to holidays, seasons and special events. He was described as the driving force behind the program. The Happy Gang remained on the air for 22 years.

=== United States broadcasting and Hollywood work ===
The Happy Gang was also heard in the United States. A 1949 article in Radio Showmanship listed the program’s United States first broadcast as 15 March 1948 and stated that it aired on the Mutual Broadcasting System from Monday to Friday, 1:15 to 1:45 p.m.

Pearl later moved to California. In Hollywood, he worked as a musical co-ordinator and writer of special material for The Jimmy Durante Show and The Gisele MacKenzie Show. He also wrote lyrics for guest performers including Bobby Darin, Jimmie Rodgers, Jane Powell, Ray Bolger, The Diamonds and cast members of Bonanza.

Pearl continued to perform as a pianist, including appearances in Hollywood clubs, nightclubs and with the Winnipeg Symphony Orchestra. He also returned to Canada for special appearances, including a 1975 Happy Gang reunion concert at the Canadian National Exhibition in Toronto, a 1978 tour of Saskatoon, Regina and Lethbridge, and a final performance by the group at the ACTRA Awards in Toronto.

== Honours ==
In 1982, Pearl was made a member of the Order of the Buffalo Hunt by the Province of Manitoba. He was also named an honorary citizen of Winnipeg. The Blood Indian Band named him “Chief Happy Voice in the Sky”.

== Death ==
Pearl died in Los Angeles, California, on 17 June 1986, at the age of 73, after a long illness with cancer and had lived in Los Angeles for several years before his death. He was survived by his sister, Frances Isaacs Pearl of Hollywood, three nephews and a niece.

== Legacy ==
Pearl is remembered as a figure in mid-20th-century Canadian radio entertainment. Through The Happy Gang, he helped create one of CBC Radio’s best-known variety programs, associated especially with Depression-era, wartime and postwar Canadian broadcasting.
