= K. A. Siddiqui =

Pakistani botanist and Sufi poet (1937–2009)

K.A. Siddiqui
- Born: Khushnood Ahmed Siddiqui; 15 June 1937
- Died: 17 March 2009 (aged 71); Tando Jam, Pakistan
- Education: University of Sindh (B.Sc.); Reading University (Ph.D)
- Known for: cereal crops
- Awards: Fellow Pakistan Academy of Sciences, Fellow Third World Academy of Sciences; D. Sc. Reading University
- Scientific career
- Fields: Botany biotechnology
- Workplaces: Sindh Agriculture University; Pakistan Atomic Energy Commission; University of Sindh

Khushnood Ahmed Siddiqui, also known as Dr. K. A. Siddiqui (1937–2009), was a renowned Pakistani botanist and Sufi poet from Sindh, known widely for his work in genetic engineering (mainly in developing various cereal crops and wheat varieties, as well as for his spiritual poetry and literary works, influenced by his mentor, Sindhi poet Umar Bin Muhammad Daudpota and Sufi poet Shah Abdul Latif Bhittai.

== Biography ==
Siddiqui was born on 15 June 1937 in pre-partition India in the city of Indore, with his parents migrated to newly liberated Pakistan and settled in the historic city of Sukkur in the Sindh province.

He did his early schooling and high school education from Sukkur. After graduating from the Sindh Agriculture College, Sakrand (affiliated with University of Sindh) in 1956, he was appointed as a Lecturer of Botany at the then Sindh Agriculture College, Tando Jam (now the Sindh Agriculture University). He won a competitive award of the prestigious Commonwealth Scholarship to pursue higher studies in England and earned his Ph.D. in Cytogenetics from Reading University in 1964. His doctorate was followed by a post-doctoral scholarship from Canada upon completion of which he joined the Pakistan Atomic Energy Commission, posted at the Nuclear Institute of Agriculture (formerly Atomic Energy Agricultural Research Centre), Tando Jam, as Senior Scientific Officer (8 June 1967). He was later given the charge as the Head of Plant Genetics Division in PAEC. During his successful career, he was appointed on important appointments as Principal Scientific Officer, Chief Scientific Officer and Chief Scientist, including serving as the Director of the center from 1992–1997. He retired from public service in 1997 and remained a consultant with the Higher Education Commission and University of Sindh, Jamshoro. He also served as a visiting senior scientist with the Danish Atomic Energy Commission, Denmark, from 1970 to 1972.

As per Pakistan Botanical Society, "Dr. Siddiqui has made a significant contribution in the field of plant breeding and genetics particularly in the evolution of wheat, rice, sugarcane, pulses and the oil seed crop varieties through the use of conventional (hybridization) and mutation breeding techniques.". A number of prominent wheat varieties were produced by his team including, the Jauhar-78, Sindh-81, Sarsabz, Soghat-90 and Kiran-95. He authored more than 200 national and international publications, which included scientific research papers, conference proceedings and scientific books, published in a number of renowned periodicals and journals.

He received a number of national and international honors and awards, including Dr. Borlaug Gold Medal (1986), Open Gold Medal, Pakistan Academy of Sciences Award (1988), Commonwealth Science Council Award (1993), Lateef Gold Medal for Eminence in Science and Technology (1994), AlKhwarzmi International Award (1995) and Bhittai Academy Award (1995), in addition to being awarded with fellowships with the Pakistan Academy of Sciences and TWAS. As a recognition of his prowess in genetic engineering, Reading University awarded him an honoris causa degree of Doctor of Science (D.Sc.) in 2001.

Siddiqui died as a result of a massive heart attack at his home in Tando Jam, on 17 March 2009, survived by his wife and children. An obituary was published in Dawn on 25 March 2009. A foundation has been made in his name to promote agricultural science.
