= The Happy Gang =

Canadian radio show

The Happy Gang display at the CBC Museum, 2009

The Happy Gang was a Canadian Broadcasting Corporation radio lunchtime variety show that ran from 1937 to 1959. During the Golden Age of Radio and well into the 1950s, it was one of Canada's most popular programs. In its heyday, it had about two million listeners a day. The show was known for its "spontaneous humor, music, and corny jokes."

The Happy Gang debuted on June 14, 1937 on station CRCT, a CBC affiliate in Toronto, later known as CBL. Originally intended as just a summer fill-in, it gained a following, and was moved to the CBC network four months later. The Happy Gang ran for 22 years, totalling nearly 4900 broadcasts, until it was finally cancelled in late August 1959. The series also served as the template for CBC's French language service, Les Joyeux Troubadours (fr), which was broadcast from 1941 to 1977.

== Early years ==
In 1937, CBC Regional Program Director George Taggart was given the assignment to come up with a Monday-through-Friday half-hour variety program that would fill the period 1:00 to 1:30 p.m. E.S.T. His tight budget permitted only four musicians. To “lead the band”, and as Master of Ceremonies, Taggart’s choice was Bert Pearl, whose real name was Bert Shapira. Credited with coming up with the concept that became the Happy Gang, Pearl's on-air persona was "that slap-happy chappy, the Happy Gang's Own Pappy." His fellow musicians were trumpeter Robert (Bob) Farnon, violinist Blain Mathé and organist Kathleen (Kay) Stokes. Stokes was already a popular entertainer; she had been the staff organist at CFRB in Toronto, and was also known in vaudeville and on the air as "Canada's Sweetheart of the Theatre Organ." She was the only female member of the Happy Gang, and she remained with them throughout their 22 years on the air. The fact that Stokes was the Happy Gang's only female member was mentioned in the show's signature song: they would sing "It’s the Happy Gang with the boys and Kay Stokes. We hope you’ll like our music and our songs and our jokes..."

Herb May, who served his apprenticeship with CBO Ottawa and had been moved to Toronto, became the show’s first regular announcer. George Temple was appointed the Happy Gang's first producer, and he remained a producer for the show till 1955. The Happy Gang show was originally broadcast at 11:30 a.m.; it was later moved to 1 in the afternoon. Singer-accordionist Eddie Allen joined in 1938 and stayed with the Gang for the remainder of their history, along with Mathé and Stokes. After Bert Pearl's departure in 1955, Allen became the Happy Gang's Master of Ceremonies.

The show had an iconic opening which became a catch-phrase for Canadian listeners: first there was the sound of someone knocking at the door—it was actually violinist Blain Mathé, rapping on his violin. Then a voice asked, "Who's there?" The response, "It's the Happy Gang." And the reply, "Well, come on in!"

The Happy Gang was also heard in the United States. A 1949 article in Radio Showmanship stated that the program aired on the Mutual Broadcasting System from Monday to Friday, 1:15 to 1:45 p.m., and listed its United States sponsorship model as co-operative. The article stated that the program had originated in Canada in June 1937 and that the Mutual Broadcasting System had carried it in the United States since 1938.

== Members ==
In addition to original members Pearl, Stokes, Mathé, and Farnon, other members of the Happy Gang troupe throughout its history included:

- trumpeter Bobby Gimby - from 1943–April 1959
- saxophonist-clarinetist Cliff McKay - 1943–1952 and returned to replace Gimby
- keyboardist Jimmy Namaro - 1943–1959
- bassist Joe Niosi - 1945–1959
- organist Lou Snider - 1948–1957
- pianist Lloyd Edwards - 1950–1959
- saxophonist-clarinetist Bert Niosi - 1952–1959
- accordionist Les Foster - 1955–1959
- Guest Singer Ron Sherman aka Ronald Schuman Late 1950s?

The show's announcers were Herb May until 1938, Hugh Bartlett 1938–1952, and Barry Wood 1952–1959.

== War years ==
By the time of World War II, millions of Canadians regarded the Happy Gang as friends. The show was "corny and wholesome," and during difficult times, the music and the jokes provided some much needed cheer. This was especially true during the war years. For example, the Gang performed the patriotic "There'll Always Be An England" nearly every day, giving hope to the listeners when the war effort seemed to be going badly. And songs of faith like "The Lord's Prayer" inspired and comforted listeners whose sons were fighting overseas. The members also made personal appearances, and participated in benefit concerts to support the war effort. Canadian ships at sea played phonograph records by the Happy Gang during the war years; the members also received a number of awards from the government. In addition, during the war, Happy Gang trumpet player Robert Farnon joined the Canadian army and became the conductor of the Allied Expeditionary Forces Canadian Band; he took the band to England and ended up staying, performing patriotic songs on the BBC.

== Later years ==
June Callwood wrote a profile of the Happy Gang for Maclean's Magazine in 1950 titled "The Not-So-Happy Gang" which revealed that despite their on-air camaraderie, ensemble members did not get along and that "it is possible one half the Gang would cheer happily if the other half was fired" and that host Bert Pearl, while respected by his crew, was frustrated and unhappy with his role. According to an anonymous CBC producer Callwood spoke to, "It’s killing him to slosh around with that always-smiling routine.” Regardless of disharmony behind the scenes, the programme continued to be successful with an estimated audience of 2.5 million in 1950.

In 1952, Barry Wood took over from Hugh Bartlett as the Happy Gang's new announcer, and served in that role for the show's final years.

In 1955, Bert Pearl suddenly left the Happy Gang, which was still very popular, although its audience was aging. There was no explanation given for his departure, and rumors and speculation swirled in the press that he had a serious illness or perhaps a drinking problem. Neither was true: years later, he explained that the pressure of constantly performing, with little time off for eighteen years, led to a nervous breakdown. He moved to California, where he became the music coordinator for Jimmy Durante's NBC-TV program as well as occasionally writing songs for Durante's guest vocalists.

When The Happy Gang was cancelled in 1959, some of the members continued to perform. In addition to Pearl, who mainly performed in the United States, and Farnon, who had a successful career in England as a composer and conductor, Bobby Gimby had some success in Canada as a bandleader and songwriter. And Blain Mathé became a member of the Toronto Symphony Orchestra.

Long after The Happy Gang had left the air, replaced by The Tommy Hunter Show in the summer of 1959, the troupe (except for Blain Mathé and Robert Farnon), reunited in 1975 at the Canadian National Exhibition; a record 20,000 fans attended their performance; Bert Pearl came back for that concert. Also performing was Kay Stokes, who was 81 by this time. She received two standing ovations. Some of the Gang, especially Bert Pearl, had expressed concern that so many years later, they would be forgotten, but the positive reaction they received from the audience showed that the Happy Gang had remained an important part of growing up in Canada.

A small exhibit of the show opened at CBC Museum in 2005, and remained until the space's closure in 2017. A small display, featuring Kay Stokes' organ, photos and news clippings, remains in the Ivan Harris Gallery in the lower level of the CBC's Canadian Broadcasting Centre.
