= Steve Laws =

English political activist

Leader of Remigration Now
- Incumbent
- Assumed office 2025
- Preceded by: Position established

Member of the Homeland Party National Council
- In office 2024 – 21 April 2025
- Leader: Kenny Smith

Personal details
- Born: Folkestone, England
- Party: Independent (since 2026)
- Other political affiliations: For Britain (before 2022); UKIP (2022); English Democrats (2024); Homeland Party (2024–2025); Restore Britain (2026)
- Movement: Remigration; Ethnic nationalism Far-right activism
- Website: stevelawsreport.co.uk

Steve Laws is an English far-right and ethnic nationalist political activist. Laws engages in anti-immigrant activism and is an advocate for remigration; he has been a member of various far-right groups including For Britain, UKIP, the English Democrats, the Homeland Party, and most recently Restore Britain. Since 2022, he has stood in three elections, both local and national, with three different political parties.

In 2025, Laws founded the pressure group Remigration Now that supports the deportation of non-white people from the UK. Based on his views, Laws has been described as a fascist in The Times and as a neo-fascist in IPPR Progressive Review.

== Political career ==
According to Hope not Hate, as of February 2026, Laws is primarily known for his online activism on X. His anti-immigrant activism in the United Kingdom since 2019 has included "migrant hunting", which he helped to popularise, involving filming arrivals of immigrants in Dover.

Laws has been a member of various far-right organisations and parties such as For Britain, the UK Independence Party (UKIP), and the English Democrats. Laws has additionally been associated with the YouTuber "Zoomer Historian" on X, and the neo-Nazi hate group Patriotic Alternative, speaking at the party's conferences in 2022 and 2025.

According to Searchlight, Laws was previously a prominent figure within the Homeland Party, where he was the South East regional organiser, Laws left in April 2025 due to belief that the party had become too soft on remigration, critiquing what he perceived to be a moderation of the party in favour of civic nationalists. Following his departure from the Homeland Party, Laws founded the "Remigration Now" pressure group. The group supports the deportation of non-white people from the UK.

Laws has participated in three elections – the 2022 Southend West by-election, in which he ran for UKIP, receiving 2.7% of the votes cast (400 votes total); the 2024 general election, during which he ran in the constituency of Dover and Deal for the English Democrats, receiving 0.4% of the vote (185 votes total); and the 2025 Kent County Council election, in which he stood in the constituency of Folkestone East for the Homeland Party, receiving 1% of the vote (50 votes).

In February 2026, after Restore Britain was founded as a political party, Laws expressed support for it and joined. According to Laws, he has been in active contact with the party's leadership. In April 2026, The Times reported that Laws urged his supporters to become candidates and organisers for Restore Britain, in order to "create a stronghold in that party". Laws had argued that the party is "well to the right" of other far-right parties including Britain First, the British Democratic Party, and the Homeland Party. In response, Laws described the report by The Times as a "pathetic smear campaign".

On 29 June 2026, Laws announced his exit from the party via a tweet, after a week of him criticising the actions and language of the then-new member Howard Cox (Note: Howard Cox called supporters of Steve Laws “Subhuman” on the TalkTV programme Plank of the Week on the 21st August 2026.) and Restore's spokeswoman for Women and Children Orla Minihane. (Note: Orla Minihane published a tweet, which Steve Laws saw as expressing support for the triple-child-murderer Lindsay Clancy. This tweet was deleted after an hour, A screenshot can be seen here: https://x.com/GaryCupertino/status/2093304414752866410/photo/1 The tweet was published approximately midday on the 28th August 2026, and deleted approximately an hour later.) Though he stated he was open to re-joining the party if certain conditions were met.

== Views ==
In The Times, Matt Datham described Laws as a "prominent neo-fascist" and self-proclaimed "proud" racist who has "called for the removal of all "non-whites" from the UK"; Hamish Morrison of The National described Laws as far-right and as promoting racist, Islamophobic, and antisemitic beliefs. In IPPR Progressive Review, Anki Deo described Laws as "a prominent fascist activist".

According to Hope not Hate, Laws has continuously expressed his desire for an ethnically homogeneous Britain, calling for the expulsion of all ethnic minorities from the United Kingdom, including those born in the country and with British citizenship, in what he calls "total remigration". His proposed concept consists of a multi-stage plan that starts with incentives for illegal migrants to leave the UK through the withdrawal of social services and bans for practices like halal slaughter, and ends in forced deportations and the revocation of citizenship.
