= Sevenoaks District Council elections =

Local government elections in Kent, England

Sevenoaks District Council elections are held every four years to elect Sevenoaks District Council in Kent, England. Since the last full review of boundaries in 2003 the council has comprised 54 councillors, representing 26 wards.

== Council elections ==
Composition of the council
Year	Conservative	Liberal Democrats (Note: Includes totals for the predecessors of the Liberal Democrats, the Liberal Party and SDP (both of which participated in the Alliance).)	Labour	Green	UKIP	Independents & Others	Council control after election
Local government reorganisation; council established (54 seats)
1973	29	6	6	–	–	13	Conservative
1976	36	4	2	0	–	12	Conservative
New ward boundaries (53 seats)
1979	36	4	1	0	–	12	Conservative
1983	37	4	1	0	–	11	Conservative
New ward boundaries (53 seats)
1987	34	7	0	0	–	12	Conservative
1991	31	11	0	0	–	11	Conservative
New ward boundaries (53 seats)
1995	17	20	11	0	0	5	No overall control
1999	33	9	9	0	0	2	Conservative
New ward boundaries (54 seats)
2003	33	8	10	0	0	3 (Note: Including 2 Independent Team)	Conservative
2007	41	7	5	0	0	1	Conservative
2011	47	2	4	0	0	1	Conservative
2015	49	2	1	0	1	1	Conservative
2019	46	3	1	0	0	2 (Note: 2 Hextable Independent)	Conservative
2023	33	14	0	4	0	3	Conservative

== District result maps ==
2003

2007

2011

2015

2019

2023

== By-election results ==
=== 2003-2007 ===
Dunton Green and Riverhead by-election 10 June 2004
Party	Candidate	Votes	%	±%
Conservative		901	61.8	+10.0
Liberal Democrats		331	22.7	+22.7
Labour		225	15.4	−32.8
Majority		570	39.1	
Turnout		1,457		
Conservative hold		Swing		

Kemsing by-election 5 May 2005
Party	Candidate	Votes	%	±%
Conservative		1,097	50.9	−13.0
Liberal Democrats		1,060	49.1	+13.0
Majority		37	1.7	
Turnout		2,157		
Conservative hold		Swing		

=== 2007-2011 ===
Swanley St Mary's by-election 19 February 2009
Party	Candidate	Votes	%	±%
BNP	Paul Golding	408	41.3	+41.3
Labour	Mike Hogg	332	33.6	−21.7
Conservative	Tony Searles	247	25.0	+0.1
Majority		76	7.7	
Turnout		987		
BNP gain from Labour		Swing		

=== 2011-2015 ===
Cowden and Hever by-election 29 March 2012
Party	Candidate	Votes	%	±%
Conservative	Christopher Neal	296	78.5	N/A
UKIP	Lorraine Millgate	81	21.5	N/A
Majority		215	57.0	
Turnout		377		
Conservative hold		Swing		

Crockenhill and Well Hill by-election 29 March 2012
Party	Candidate	Votes	%	±%
Labour	Jenny Dibsdall	304	58.3	N/A
Conservative	Adrian Crossley	177	34.0	N/A
UKIP	Christopher Heath	40	7.7	N/A
Majority		127	24.4	
Turnout		521		
Labour gain from Independent		Swing		

Crockenhill and Well Hill by-election 26 September 2013
Party	Candidate	Votes	%	±%
UKIP	Steve Lindsay	216	35.7	+28.0
Labour	Rachel Waterton	188	31.1	−27.2
Conservative	Allrik Birch	139	23.0	−11.0
Liberal Democrats	Philip Hobson	62	10.2	+10.2
Majority		28	4.6	
Turnout		605		
UKIP gain from Labour		Swing		

=== 2015-2019 ===
Swanley Christchurch and Swanley Village by-election 13 October 2016
Party	Candidate	Votes	%	±%
Conservative	Clare Barnes	311	34.6	−24.1
Labour	Jacqueline Griffiths	274	30.5	+2.3
Liberal Democrats	Krish Shanmuganathan	183	20.4	+20.4
UKIP	Medina Hall	131	14.6	+14.6
Majority		37	4.1	
Turnout		899		
Conservative hold		Swing		

Penshurst, Fordcombe and Chiddingstone by-election 3 August 2017
Party	Candidate	Votes	%	±%
Conservative	Sue Coleman	438	58.8	+5.5
Liberal Democrats	Richard Streatfeild	253	34.0	+0.2
Labour	Annette Webb	54	7.2	+7.2
Majority		185	24.8	
Turnout		745		
Conservative hold		Swing		

Farningham, Horton Kirby and South Darenth by-election 30 August 2018
Party	Candidate	Votes	%	±%
Conservative	Brian Carroll	542	55.7	−1.7
Liberal Democrats	Krish Shanmuganathan	260	26.7	+26.7
Labour	Emily Asher	171	17.6	−5.5
Majority		282	29.0	
Turnout		973		
Conservative hold		Swing		

=== 2019-2023 ===
Brasted, Chevening and Sundridge by-election 6 May 2021
Party	Candidate	Votes	%	±%
Conservative	Keith Bonin	1,051	54.3	+2.6
Liberal Democrats	Sandra Robinson	704	36.3	+36.3
Labour	Neil Proudfoot	182	9.4	−9.5
Majority		347	17.9	
Turnout		1,937		
Conservative hold		Swing		

Brasted, Chevening and Sundridge by-election 3 March 2022
Party	Candidate	Votes	%	±%
Conservative	Nigel Williams	820	58.7	+7.0
Liberal Democrats	Clare Coombe	524	37.5	+37.5
Labour	Theo Michael	52	3.7	−15.2
Majority		296	21.2	
Turnout		1,396		
Conservative hold		Swing		

Fawkham and West Kingsdown by-election 5 May 2022
Party	Candidate	Votes	%	±%
Conservative	Emily Bulford	892	71.4	+32.4
Labour	Jordan Selvey	202	16.2	+16.2
Liberal Democrats	Tristan Ward	156	12.5	+12.5
Majority		690	55.2	
Turnout		1,250		
Conservative hold		Swing		

Penshurst, Fordcombe and Chiddingstone by-election 9 June 2022
Party	Candidate	Votes	%	±%
Liberal Democrats	Richard Streatfeild	343	54.4	N/A
Conservative	Ian Butcher	288	45.6	N/A
Majority		55	8.8	
Turnout		631		
Liberal Democrats gain from Conservative		Swing		

=== 2023-2027 ===
Hextable by-election 5 March 2026
Party	Candidate	Votes	%	±%
Conservative	Lee Allen	600	38.9	+19.3
Reform UK	Daniel Kersten	406	26.3	+26.3
Liberal Democrats	Ashley Wassall	367	23.8	+23.8
Independent	Jackie Griffiths	108	7.0	+7.0
Green	Oliver Young	62	4.0	+4.0
Majority		194	12.6	
Turnout		1,543		
Conservative gain from Independent		Swing		

Halstead, Knockholt and Badgers Mount by-election 26 March 2026
Party	Candidate	Votes	%	±%
Conservative	Tony Marshall	561	44.2	−20.7
Reform UK	George Pender	378	29.8	+29.8
Liberal Democrats	Stephen Maines	266	20.9	−14.2
Green	Robert Royston	65	5.1	+5.1
Majority		183	14.4	
Turnout		1,270		
Conservative hold		Swing		
