= 2022 Southend West by-election =

2022 UK parliament by-election

- 3 February 2022

Southend West constituency
- Turnout: 24.0% (▼43.4 pp)
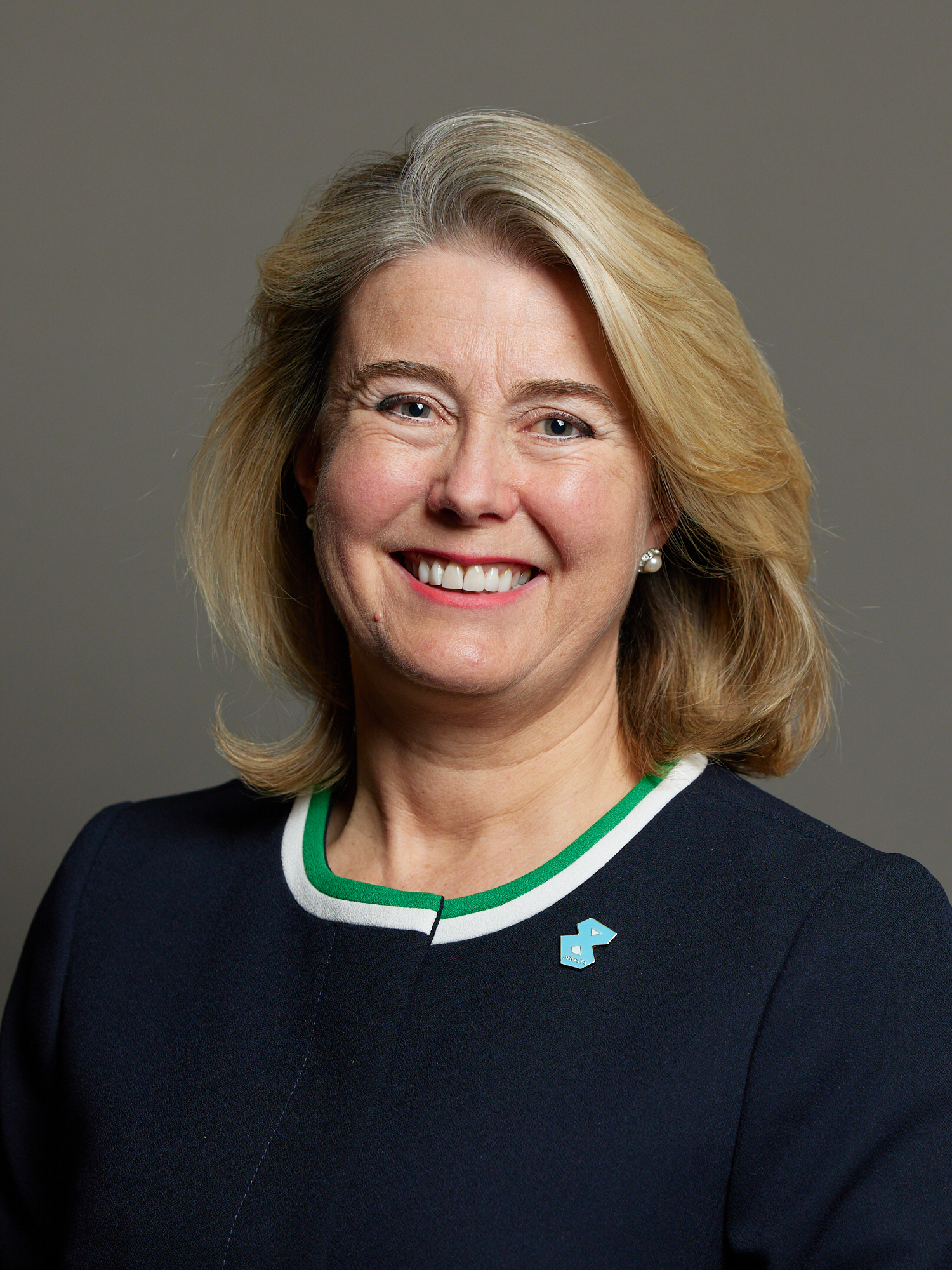
	First party
Candidate	Anna Firth
Party	Conservative
Popular vote	12,792
Percentage	86.1%
Swing	▲26.9 pp
MP before election
Sir David Amess
Conservative
Elected MP
Anna Firth
Conservative

A by-election for the United Kingdom parliamentary constituency of Southend West was held on 3 February 2022, following the murder of incumbent Conservative Party MP Sir David Amess on 15 October 2021. It was won by Anna Firth who held the seat for the Conservatives with 86% of the vote.

The major opposition parties declined to stand out of respect for Amess, similarly to the 2016 Batley and Spen by-election—held after Labour Party MP Jo Cox was murdered.

== Background ==
On 15 October 2021, Amess, who had been the MP for the Southend West constituency for more than 20 years, was stabbed multiple times at a constituency surgery, and was later pronounced dead at the scene despite efforts to treat his injuries. Amess was first elected to represent the seat in 1997. His death left the seat vacant, triggering the by-election. His funeral was held on 22 November 2021. The writ setting the date of the by-election was moved on 5 January 2022, with the date of the election being set for 3 February.

The constituency is one of two covering Southend-on-Sea in Essex. The other seat is Southend East and Rochford. Other towns in the seat include Leigh-on-Sea and Westcliff-on-Sea. It voted Leave by 56% to 44% in the 2016 EU referendum.

Southend West has elected Conservative MPs since it was created in 1950. Prior to Amess, the seat had only had two other MPs: Henry Channon (1950–1958), and his son Paul Channon (1959–1997), who served in the government of Margaret Thatcher as Trade and Industry Secretary and Transport Secretary.

== Candidates ==
In the days after the murder of Amess, the Labour Party, the Liberal Democrats, the Green Party and Reform UK each stated they would not field a candidate in opposition to the Conservative nominee. This follows the precedent set by the Conservatives and other major parties in the 2016 Batley and Spen by-election following the murder of Labour MP Jo Cox. Patrick Maguire, writing in The Times, was critical of this decision, citing the 1990 Eastbourne by-election following the assassination of the constituency's MP by the Provisional Irish Republican Army (IRA), which was contested by all the major parties and saw the seat change hands.

The Southend West Conservative Association said they wanted a local person selected to be the candidate. The party said they were waiting until after Amess' funeral on 22 November to select their candidate. Applications were opened on 25 November.

The following were reported as applying: Gavin Chambers, Epping Forest District councillor; Anna Firth; Seena Shah; Andrew Sheldon, leader of Castle Point Borough Council; Tamkeen Shaikh, previously stood for Southend Borough Council, and for Barking at the 2019 general election; Kevin Buck, James Courtenay and Alex Bright, Southend councillors; and Katie Channon, the daughter-in-law of Paul Channon, Southend West MP until 1997.

On 11 December 2021, Firth was selected as the Conservative candidate. She unsuccessfully contested Erith and Thamesmead in 2015 and Canterbury in 2019, and was a barrister and councillor on Sevenoaks Council. She was the chair of the Conservative Policy Forum.

The British Freedom Party said their leader, Jayda Fransen, would stand. (Note: Nominally, Fransen stood as an independent — The British Freedom Party was not a registered political party) She had most recently stood as an independent in the 2021 Batley and Spen by-election, finishing in 15th place with 50 votes, or 0.13% of the vote.

UK Independence Party (UKIP) announced its immigration spokesman Steve Laws as a candidate. The announcement, which the party linked to its critiques of the Conservative Party's immigration policy, was condemned by the Conservatives and a Labour councillor.

Graham Moore represented the English Constitution Party, which fielded a candidate for the first time.

Catherine Blaiklock was the founder and first leader of the Brexit Party, before moving to the English Democrats.

Olga Childs stood as an unaligned independent.

The candidates in the election were announced on 11 January 2022.

== Campaign ==
It was reported in The Times on 15 January 2022 that Conservative campaigners believed that the effect of the Downing Street parties controversy would mean the "turnout could be dire", citing comments by a "veteran activist" that they had been "met with a wall of disapproval such that [they] have never had before in 25 years of doing this."

On 21 January 2022, Childs announced via her campaign Twitter account that she would not be campaigning due to ill health. She asked voters to ignore her name on the ballot paper.

During the campaign, Firth stressed continuity with Amess. Anderson, Downton and Fransen were all opposed to further lockdowns and COVID-19 vaccine mandates for healthcare staff, while Blaiklock, Fransen and Laws all supported greater immigration controls. Jason Pilley talked about protecting health services, ending the "war on drugs" and making cannabis a legalised and regulated industry. A report by Hope not Hate on the candidates in the by-election noted that Pilley's manifesto also called for the far-right activist Tommy Robinson (Stephen Yaxley-Lennon) to be appointed to the House of Lords. Moore said he would ask the Government to make Southend a free port.

== Result ==
2022 Southend West by-election
Party	Candidate	Votes	%	±%
Conservative	Anna Firth	12,792	86.1	+26.9
Psychedelic Movement	Jason Pilley	512	3.4	New
UKIP	Steve Laws	400	2.7	New
English Democrat	Catherine Blaiklock	320	2.2	New
Independent	Jayda Fransen	299	2.0	New
Heritage	Ben Downton	236	1.6	New
Freedom Alliance	Christopher Anderson	161	1.1	New
English Constitution Party	Graham Moore	86	0.6	New
Independent	Olga Childs	52	0.3	New
Majority		12,280	82.7	+51.6
Turnout		15,942	24.0	–43.4
Rejected ballots		1,084	6.8	
Registered electors		66,354		
Conservative hold		Swing		

The number of spoilt ballot papers rose four-fold to 1,084, greater than the number of votes for any of the losing candidates. Some bore remarks critical of the Prime Minister Boris Johnson which a BBC analysis described as "a sign that events in Westminster have played out here at the polls". Firth said that the low turnout and high number of spoilt ballot papers were not connected to the ongoing government Partygate scandal, arguing that "you would expect a high number of spoilt ballots in an election where there is actually no left wing candidate standing at all". The 24% turnout was just below that in the 2016 Batley and Spen by-election – which was similarly uncontested by the opposing main parties following the murder of the previous MP – and the third lowest since 1945.

== Previous result ==
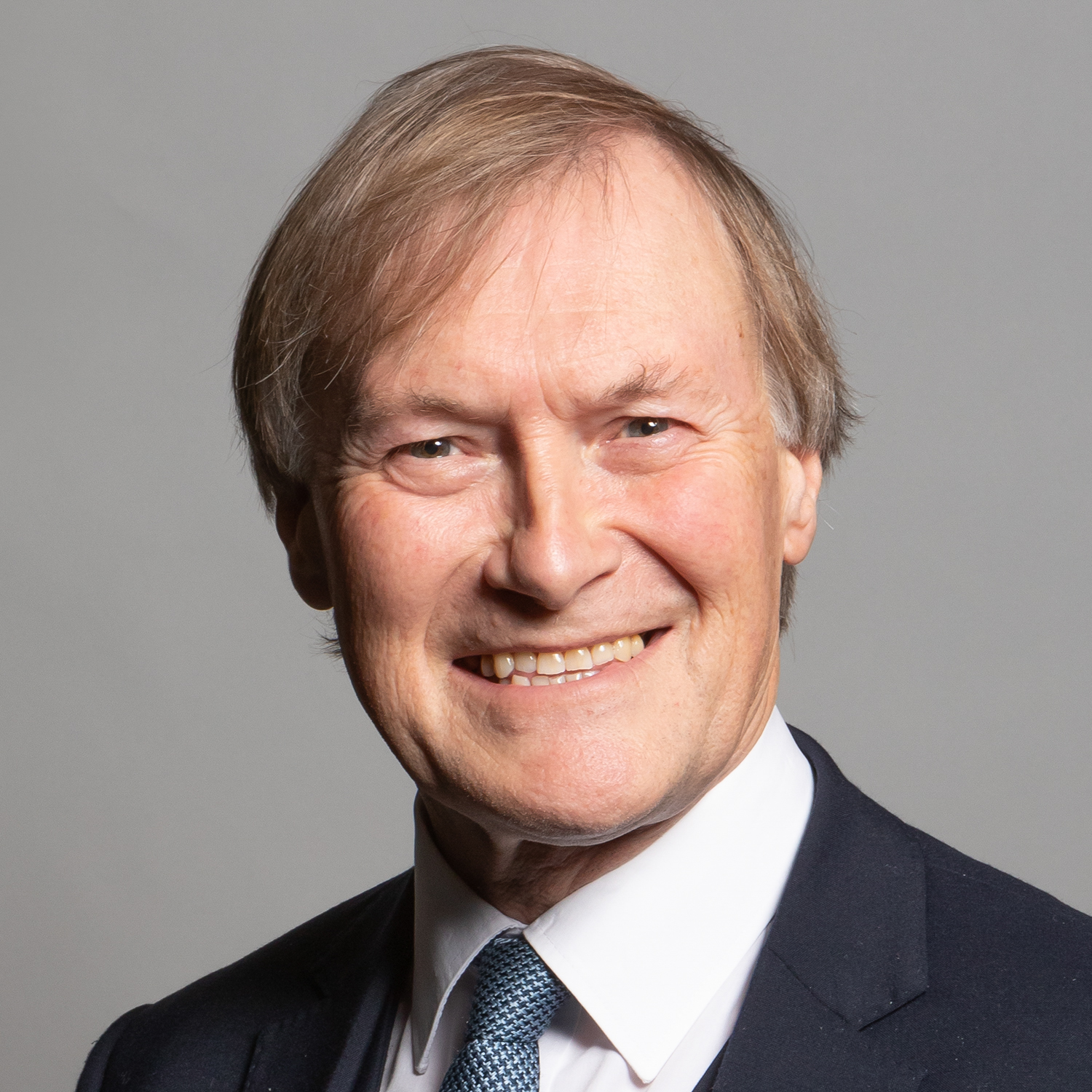
Sir David Amess held the Southend West constituency from 1997 until he was murdered in 2021.

General election 2019: Southend West
Party	Candidate	Votes	%	±%
Conservative	David Amess	27,555	59.2	+4.0
Labour	Aston Line	13,096	28.1	–5.9
Liberal Democrats	Nina Stimson	5,312	11.4	+6.9
Independent	77 Joseph	574	1.2	New
Majority		14,459	31.1	+9.9
Turnout		46,537	67.4	–2.3
Registered electors		69,046		
Conservative hold		Swing	+4.9	
