= Zoomer Historian =

British YouTuber

- YouTube profile picture
- Born: Samuel Wilkes; Guernsey
- Children: 2

Substack information
- Newsletter: zoomerhistorian.substack.com
- Notes: @zoomerhistorian
- Years active: 2025–present
- Topic: History
- Subscribers: 11 thousand

X information
- Handle: @ZoomerHistorian
- Years active: 2023–present
- Topics: History; Politics
- Followers: 130 thousand

YouTube information
- Channel: @ZoomerHistorian
- Years active: 2016–2025
- Genre: History
- Subscribers: 270,000+
- Political party: Restore Britain (since 2026)
- Other political affiliations: Homeland Party (until 2025)

Samuel Wilkes, known online as Zoomer Historian (formerly SamGSY) is a British YouTuber, who was described by Hope Not Hate as "key online propagandist" for the Homeland Party, a fascist political party. The SamGSY channel initially uploaded football-related content before being renamed to "Zoomer Historian" in March 2023 and uploading World War II-related content, mostly about Nazi Germany and Adolf Hitler. The channel was suspended in November 2025 for hate speech.

== Biography ==
Wilkes was born in Guernsey and has lived for multiple years in Eastern European countries, including Romania and Latvia.

According to Wilkes, he became involved in politics in 2010s after watching videos created by members of the far-right group Groypers, including Nick Fuentes. During the COVID-19 pandemic, Wilkes became radicalised after watching conspiracy theorists. In 2021, he became interested in Nazi Germany and Holocaust denial after watching videos on the internet, including speeches of writer David Irving, whom he described as a "man who tells things as they are".

Wilkes first created a channel in 2016 under the name "SamGSY". It published content related to FIFA and football, gaining tens of thousands of subscribers. In March 2023, he renamed it to "Zoomer Historian" and began uploading content related the history of World War II, mostly about Nazi Germany and Adolf Hitler. Hope Not Hate said that the channel's videos defended Adolf Hitler and Nazi Germany, portraying it as a victim of Allied aggression.

Wilkes claimed to have worked with Irving and his family for three to four years while he was incapacitated by illness. He also said that most of his income came from the YouTube channel. Wilkes was a prominent Homeland Party activist, but he and fellow activist Steve Laws left the party in April 2025 and became harsh critics of it. The reason for Wilkes and Laws' departure from the party was the appointment of Carter McAfee as the first organiser of the Homeland Party in Northern Ireland, who was gay and showed support for Irish republicanism. As a result, Wilkes and Laws created an organisation called "Remigration Now", which was joined by a significant portion of the Homeland Party.

Wilkes operates an X (formerly Twitter) account with over 130,000 followers, which he has used to promote the fascist Homeland Party, white genocide conspiracy theory, and remigration. In February 2025, the Patreon account of Zoomer Historian was banned; he described the incident as a "gigantic financial hit". In November 2025 the channel was suspended for hate speech. The channel had over 270,000 subscribers at its peak. As a result, Zoomer Historian has moved to other video hosting platforms.

In June 2026, Sam Wilkes joined Restore Britain. On his X Zoomer Historian account, Wilkes described the party as "the only serious party in the country". He also described Restore Britain leader Rupert Lowe as "our Ian Smith".

== Personal life ==
Wilkes has two children with his Latvian fiancée.

== Reception ==
Felix Pope of Unherd described Sam Wilkes as a "Nazi-apologist YouTuber". The New World described Wilkes as a conspiracy theorist who defends Adolf Hitler. Byline Times said that Wilkes' YouTube channel is "Hitler revisionist". Hope Not Hate described Wilkes as one of the "most high-profile promoters of WWII revisionism" and a "key online propagandist" for Homeland Party. Searchlight Magazine called Wilkes a "nazi grifter".
