= Homeland Party (UK) =

British far-right political party

Homeland Party: Plaid y Famwlad (Welsh); Tìr-Dhàimh (Scottish Gaelic)
- Abbreviation: HP
- Chairman: Kenny Smith
- Founder: Kenny Smith
- Founded: April 2023; 3 years ago
- Registered: 31 January 2024; 2 years ago
- Dissolved: 26 September 2026
- Split from: Patriotic Alternative
- Headquarters: Kirknewton, West Lothian, Scotland
- Membership: ~1,300
- Ideology: Fascism (British) (Note: Fascism and fascist:); White supremacism; White nationalism
- Political position: Far-right (Note: Sources describing the party as far-right:)
- Colours: Green; White
- House of Commons: 0 / 650
- Councillors in England: 0 / 17,546

Website
- homelandparty.org

The Homeland Party was a far-right political party in the United Kingdom. It was founded as a splinter of the neo-Nazi group Patriotic Alternative in April 2023 by the white nationalist Kenny Smith, and registered as a party in January 2024. A part of the British fascist movement, it has been described as the largest fascist group in the UK by Hope not Hate. The party was effectively defunct on the 26th of September 2026, however it had been in sharp decline since the beginning of that year.

== History ==
=== Founding ===
The Homeland Party was formed predominately by Scottish members who had left the neo-Nazi group Patriotic Alternative (PA) over differences stemming from strict member verification and political ambitions of electoral politics through a registered party championed by Kenny Smith. PA and Homeland are ideologically similar and ideological differences were not a reason for the split. Smith, the chairman of Homeland, founded the party in April 2023. Smith was previously the national administration officer for PA, and the head of administration and an unsuccessful electoral candidate for the fascist British National Party (BNP). According to Searchlight, in 2023 Alek Yerbury had left PA and formed a new militant group named the National Support Detachment. Within a month, Smith also left and formed Homeland, attracting many members of PA to join. Homeland espouses the white genocide conspiracy theory and other far-right beliefs such as remigration, although it publicly uses innocuous messaging and downplays its neo-Nazi connections.

=== Other links ===
The party's other registered officers also have connections with PA. Jerome O'Reilly is the Welsh regional organiser and Anthony Burrows is the East Midlands regional organiser. Burrows, a parish councillor for Blackwell, Bolsover, has posted photographs of Adolf Hitler and David Duke, the former leader of the Ku Klux Klan, on his Twitter account and had his shotguns confiscated and a gun licence refused for sharing terrorist literature and manifestos, including The Turner Diaries by William Luther Pierce, and for sympathising with violence against minorities.

Simon Shepherd, Homeland founding member and Scotland regional organiser and formerly a member of the PA, was involved with Ashley Podsiad-Sharp and his neo-Nazi White Stag Athletic Club (inspired by the Active Club Network) and with PA's fascist fitness club which was founded and headed by Kristofer Kearney and Smith. Podsiad-Sharp and Kearney hosted The Absolute State of Britain podcast, founded by Sharp, which "has consistently featured explicit racism, misogyny, anti-Semitism, Holocaust denial, veneration of Hitler, and apologism for Nazi atrocities and right-wing terrorism." Both of them have been convicted and sentenced to prison for possessing and disseminating terrorist material. Tom Huburn-King, a Homeland founding member and its West Midlands organiser, was also associated with Kearney and the White Stag and PA fascist fitness clubs.

Senior party members such as Callum Barker, Alec Cave and Smith have also been associated with the alt-right writer Curtis Yarvin.

=== Registration ===
The group first attempted to register as a political party in May 2023, but its application was rejected.

Complaints were raised by the Home Office to the Electoral Commission after a leaked audio of Smith which detailed a plan that Homeland might try to register under fake or proxy names for the party and its officers to hide its connections with known white supremacists. It was registered as a political party in January 2024, unlike PA which failed to do so seven times due to internal party rules that violated British equality and anti-discrimination laws.

=== Noteworthy members ===
In April 2023 Judge Isabel Manley ruled against Alec Cave, a senior member of the party and its national media officer, in an employment tribunal relating to comments made by him about the actor John Boyega, who is a Black Briton. In her ruling Judge Manley said of Cave's views, "This is not just a belief that is shocking, offensive or disturbing to others, though it may well be all those things. It is a belief that, in at least some respects, is akin to Nazism."

In October 2023 it was reported that David Gardner, a member of the party and the treasurer of the community council of Forfar, had made racist and antisemitic comments and had taken part in a neo-Nazi Telegram channel under the pseudonym "Gordon Freeman", along with other Homeland activists. Later in October 2023 it was reported that James Munro, Jordon Murphy and Robert Bisset, members of the party, had been involved in the neo-Nazi group Scottish Nationalist Society. Another Homeland activist, Liam Hart (a.k.a. Liam Connor), is involved in the neo-Nazi music scene Blood & Honour.

In 2024 Homeland began to recruit fascist social media influencers, including "You Kipper", a propagandist for the British fascist politician Oswald Mosley, and the Nazi-apologist YouTuber Sam Wilkes (a.k.a. Zoomer Historian) a follower of the Holocaust-denier David Irving. In March of the same year Jamie Brown, Invergowrie and Kingoodie community council chairman and a Homeland member, was revealed to have made numerous antisemitic statements and slurs.

Steve Laws, the former South East organiser of the party and former member of the PA, UK Independence Party, English Democrats and For Britain Movement, who made "migrant hunting" videos targeting refugees in the UK quit Homeland in April 2025 saying it was "going soft" on its remigration policy (the ethnic cleansing of non-white minorities).

The same year, Alexander Bramham, a gay member of Homeland, was expelled from the party. Bramham said that it was due to his opposition to anti-LGBT and fascist views of other Homeland members.

=== Activities ===
In September 2024 the Homeland Party held its annual conference in Derbyshire with guest speakers from the far-right European parties Alternative for Germany (AfD) and the Polish Confederation Liberty and Independence, which was met with a protest outside after it was publicised by the anti-fascist group Red Flare.

In October 2024 Homeland merged with Identity England, a small English branch of the far-right Identitarian movement.

In March 2025 senior members of the Homeland Party travelled to Germany. Whilst there they sent a delegation to the Bundestag, were hosted by AfD and received media training from them.

In April 2025 the party held its "Big Remigration Conference". The speakers included the French conspiracy theorist and novelist Renaud Camus (who originated the Great Replacement conspiracy theory) and Lena Kotré, an AfD member of the Landtag of Brandenburg. Camus was denied entry to Britain by the Home Office, which said his presence would not be "conducive to the public good"; he appeared at the conference via a video link.

In July and August 2025, Homeland members were involved in organising local protests in Epping, Essex, after three charges of sexual assault were brought against an asylum-seeker housed in The Bell Hotel. Other far-right groups that have attended include a former member of the Combat 18 neo-Nazi terrorist group, some former For Britain members, PA, a Blood & Honour member, Britain First, the British Democratic Party and a number of Reform UK councillors including James Reagan. Having started on 13 July, the protests continued for some time, with the most recent occurring on 17 August. Some protests have met counter-protests by Stand Up To Racism. There have been reports of violence, although the police reports indicate that the more recent protests have been mostly peaceful. Major Homeland organisers included Callum Barker and Andrew Piper. Piper, a Market Deeping councillor, has made antisemitic posts online while Barker, a former PA member, posed for a photograph with a copy of the American domestic terrorist Ted Kaczynski's manifesto, Industrial Society and Its Future, and shared neo-Nazi content online.

The party did not stand any candidates in England's 2026 local elections. In response to this, Mark Collett, the leader of Patriotic Alternative called the Homeland Party "a grift operation".

In July of 2026, Searchlight reported that the party's collapse had deepened, with chat groups being purged, and the membership had greatly fallen since the earlier peaks; partly due to previous high profile defections. In September 2026 they reported that the Homeland Party and Kenny Smith's social media accounts had been shut down.

== Political views ==
The Homeland Party supports a policy of remigration, a European far-right concept of ethnic cleansing via the deportation of ethnic minorities. In November 2024 it published an expanded policy proposal titled Immigration & Remigration, detailing specific measures to be taken to both cease and reverse immigration to the British Isles. In April 2025 The Telegraph described the party as "nationalist and anti-immigration", highlighting one of its policies of "the re-migration, or encouraged mass emigration, of unintegrated and illegal migrants."

== Election results ==
=== UK local elections ===
Year	Level	Council	Ward	Candidate	Votes	%	Position	Finish
2024	District	Hart	Hartley Wintney	Roger Robertson	355	13.5%	Councillor	3rd of 4
2025	County	Derbyshire	Bolsover	Tom Batten	84	2.6%	Councillor	6th of 7
2025	County	Kent	Folkestone East	Steve Laws	50	1%	Councillor	6th of 7
2025	County	Kent	Maidstone; Rural East	Simon Bennett	64	1%	Councillor	6th of 6
2025	County	Lincolnshire	Deepings West & Rural	Andrew Piper	67	2.5%	Councillor	4th of 4
2025	County	Norfolk	Mancroft (Note: By-Election)	Lorna Garner	25	1%	Councillor	6th of 6

== Bibliography ==
- Wilhelmsen, Fredrik (2 October 2021). "Heroic Pasts and Anticipated Futures: A Comparative Analysis of the Conceptions of History of the Nordic Resistance Movement and Generation Identity". Politics, Religion & Ideology. 22 (3–4): 277–301. doi:10.1080/21567689.2021.1968842. ISSN 2156-7689.
- Miller-Idriss, Cynthia (11 January 2022). Hate in the Homeland: The New Global Far Right. Princeton University Press. ISBN 978-0-691-23429-8.
- Ebner, Julia (23 March 2021). Going Dark: The Secret Social Lives of Extremists. Bloomsbury Publishing. ISBN 978-1-5266-4209-7.
- Burden, Emily Louise (2023). The violence of 'Non-violence': A socio-technical study of the ethnocultural politics and strategies of New Right identitarianism (phd thesis). University of Southampton.
- Bergmann, Eirikur (1 May 2024). "Eurabia". Weaponizing Conspiracy Theories. ISBN 9781003460770.
