= Matthew F. Collins =

English activist and author (born 1972)

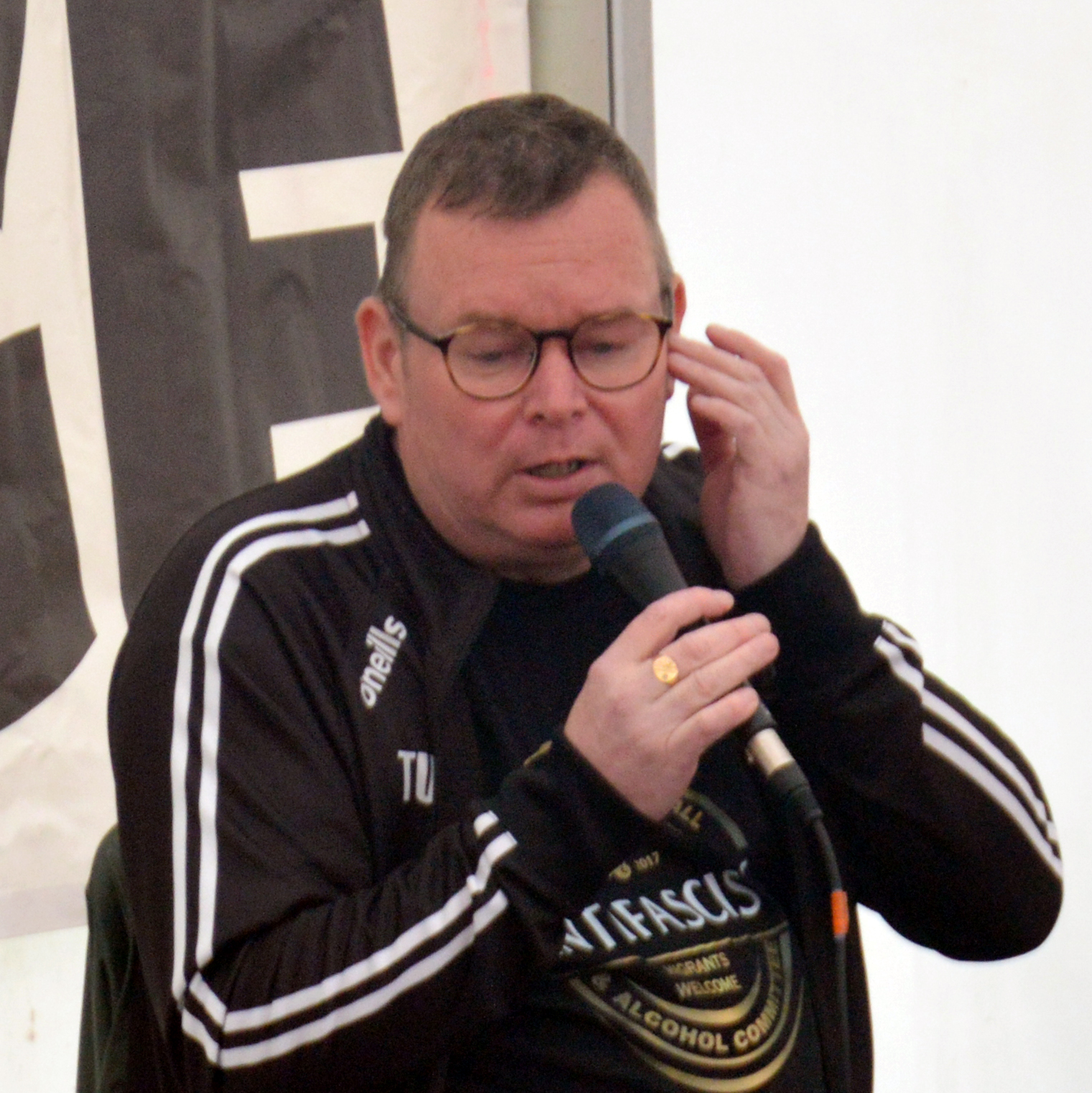
Matthew Collins in 2023

Matthew F. Collins (born 1972) is an English activist and author. Born in London, he was previously a member of several British fascist and neo-Nazi organisations, before starting to work as an informant for the anti-fascist magazine Searchlight. He later became an activist for anti-fascist and anti-racist campaigns.

== Far-right politics and role as informant ==
In his youth, Collins was the South London organiser for the National Front, a volunteer for the British National Party’s head office and a member of the neo-Nazi organisation Combat 18.

Collins took part in the Battle of Welling after which he became a paid informant for the anti-fascist Searchlight magazine. Collins was paid in book tokens for his role as an informant. When his role as a Searchlight informant was exposed, Collins went into hiding in Australia.

He returned to the UK as the subject of a BBC documentary Dead Man Walking (2004).

In 2012, Collins wrote a memoir of his youth, entitled Hate: My Life in the British Far Right which included a foreword by Billy Bragg.

== Hope Not Hate ==
Matthew Collins is currently a researcher and Head of Intelligence for the anti-fascist and anti-racist campaign group Hope Not Hate. The group is described as a non-sectarian, non-partisan third party organisation. He manages Hope Not Hate's intelligence network.

Collins managed Robbie Mullen, a mole in National Action, in foiling a plot to murder Labour MP Rosie Cooper in 2017. In 2019, Matthew Collins wrote his second book, Nazi Terrorist: The Story of National Action with Robbie Mullen, and in 2022, he wrote his third book, The Walk-In: Fascists, Spies & Lies – The True Story Behind the ITV series, with a foreword by political journalist Kevin Maguire associate editor of the Daily Mirror newspaper.

Collins is played by the actor Stephen Graham in the ITV television drama series The Walk-In broadcast in Autumn 2022. He appeared in the documentary Nazi Hunters: The Real Walk-In which was broadcast after the final episode.
