= The Rochdale Herald =

British satire news website

- Website type: Satirical News
- Available in: English
- Country of origin: United Kingdom
- Website: rochdaleherald.co.uk/page/3/
- Registration: Optional
- Launched: June 13, 2016; 10 years ago
- Current status: Inactive

The Rochdale Herald is a British satirical website founded in June 2016. Based in Rochdale, UK, the site hosts satirical pieces on local, national, and international news. The site's tagline is "The World's Worst Local Newspaper".

On numerous occasions readers have mistaken the site's articles for real news stories, much to the amusement of regular readers.

Though the site still works, no articles have been published since March 2021. However, the Twitter and Facebook accounts for The Rochdale Herald remain active.

== Notable articles ==
=== Paul Golding fundraiser ===
In December 2016, Paul Golding, the leader of far-right political party Britain First was jailed for eight weeks after breaching a High Court ban on him entering any mosque in England and Wales. The Rochdale Herald was quick to capitalise on this by creating a JustGiving page titled "The Paul Golding Sponsored Jail Term" to raise funds for the Refugee Council. The fundraiser received £5,287 from 440 donors before ending on 24 December.

=== Buzz Aldrin parody interview ===
On 3 July 2017, The Rochdale Herald published the article Buzz Aldrin says not punching Trump is his greatest achievement. The piece is a parody interview between a Herald journalist and Buzz Aldrin following his 30 June attendance at an executive order signing ceremony by U.S. President Donald Trump, which re-established the National Space Council. With the first paragraph reading: "Buzz Aldrin has suprised [sic] many today by saying that his greatest achievement is not punching Donald Trump. Mr Aldrin attended an event where the President gave a rambling word salad of a speech."

The article, which is an allusion to an incident where Aldrin punched a moon landing conspiracy theorist, was widely circulated on social media. It was eventually fact-checked by Snopes on 6 July 2017.

=== Massive Mohammed hoax ===
On 13 August 2017, the site published an article titled Big Ben to be renamed Massive Mohammed from 2018, where they announced that Big Ben would be renamed to "reflect the city’s growing diversity". Further adding, "Due to health and safety fears, ‘Massive Mo’ will be silenced during the four-year renovation period, however, [...] large speakers installed at the top of the tower will instead play the Muslim call to prayer every hour upon the hour." The article concludes with a fake quote from the office of London mayor Sadiq Khan:

When asked to comment on the project, a spokesman for London Mayor Sadiq Khan said, "What a load of utter bollocks. You’ve made this whole thing up. It’s like the ‘halal countdown’ thing all over again. Now if you’ll excuse me, Mr. Khan has a meeting with the Islamic Council in five minutes about their plans to turn St. Paul’s into a mosque. That dome is going to look glorious in gold!”

The article was shared on Facebook, where it received sharp backlash from users believing the headline to be true. In an article for ShortList, Dave Fawbert opined that the piece was "Winding up racists", as many users responded to the post citing it as an example of a purported loss of cultural heritage.

== See also ==
- List of satirical news websites
