= 2015 Sevenoaks District Council election =

2015 local election in England

Map of the results

The 2015 Sevenoaks District Council election took place on 7 May 2015 to elect members of the Sevenoaks District Council in England. It was held on the same day as other local elections.

The Conservative Party retained their majority on the council, winning 49 of the 54 seats. The Liberal Democrats won two seats and the Labour Party and UKIP won one seat each. One seat was won by an Independent candidate.

Boundary changes triggered by the Sevenoaks (Electoral Changes) Order 2014 came into force at this election. The wards which were affected were: Hartley and Hodsoll Street; Ash and New Ash Green; Otford and Shoreham; Enysford; Swanley Christchurch and Swanley Village; Hextable; Leigh and Chiddingstone Causeway; Penshurst, Fordcombe and Chiddingstone; Brasted, Chevening and Sundridge; and Westerham and Crockham Hill.

== Results ==
2015 Sevenoaks District Council election
| Party | Candidates | Seats | Change (Note: Due to boundary changes since the last council election, seat change numbers may be skewed.) | Votes | % |
|---|---|---|---|---|---|
| Conservative | 54 | 49 | ▲2 | 70,261 | 63.8 |
| Liberal Democrats | 20 | 2 | 0 | 10,775 | 9.8 |
| Labour | 25 | 1 | ▼3 | 12,009 | 10.9 |
| UKIP | 8 | 1 | ▲1 | 4,351 | 4.0 |
| Independent (Note: Including one candidate without a party description) | 3 | 1 | 0 | 1,790 | 1.6 |
| Green | 25 | | | 10,039 | 9.1 |
| Independent Voice - Community Focus (Note: Independent Voice - Community Focus was a political party formed in time for the 2015 local elections. Its leader was Janet Sargeant, who stood in the Swanley White Oak ward. The party was deregistered in November 2016.) | 2 | | | 809 | 0.7 |
| Libertarian | 1 | | | 43 | 0.0 |
| Total | 138 | 54 | 0 | 110,077 | 100.0 |

== Ward results ==
=== Ash and New Ash Green ===
Ash and New Ash Green
| Party | Candidate | Votes | % | ±% |
|---|---|---|---|---|
| Conservative | Cameron Clark | 1,775 | 25.5 | |
| Conservative | Alan Pett | 1,630 | 23.4 | |
| Conservative | Claire Pearsall | 1,586 | 22.8 | |
| Labour | Mary Bainbridge | 715 | 10.3 | |
| Green | Mark Skelton | 646 | 9.3 | |
| Green | Norah Skelton | 602 | 8.7 | |
| Total votes | | 6,954 | | |
| Majority | | 871 | 12.5 | |
| Rejected ballots | | 37 | 1.1 | |
| Turnout | | 3,315 | 71.0 | |
| Registered electors | | 4,671 | | |
| Conservative win (new seat) | | | | |
| Conservative win (new seat) | | | | |
| Conservative win (new seat) | | | | |

=== Brasted, Chevening and Sundridge ===
Brasted, Chevening and Sundridge
| Party | Candidate | Votes | % | ±% |
|---|---|---|---|---|
| Conservative | James London | 2,365 | 24.9 | |
| Conservative | Anna Firth | 2,337 | 24.6 | |
| Conservative | Robert Piper | 2,166 | 22.8 | |
| Liberal Democrats | Elaine Coupe | 703 | 7.4 | |
| Green | Sarah White | 696 | 7.3 | |
| Green | Marcus Fry | 622 | 6.5 | |
| Liberal Democrats | Bob Coupe | 611 | 6.4 | |
| Total votes | | 9,500 | | |
| Majority | | 1463 | 15.4 | |
| Rejected ballots | | 69 | 1.8 | |
| Turnout | | 3,742 | 74.3 | |
| Registered electors | | 5,033 | | |
| Conservative win (new seat) | | | | |
| Conservative win (new seat) | | | | |
| Conservative win (new seat) | | | | |

=== Cowden and Hever ===
Cowden and Hever
| Party | Candidate | Votes | % | ±% |
|---|---|---|---|---|
| Conservative | Matthew Dickins | 919 | 80.3 | |
| UKIP | Lorraine Millgate | 225 | 19.7 | |
| Total votes | | 1,144 | | |
| Majority | | 694 | 60.7 | |
| Rejected ballots | | 49 | 4.1 | |
| Turnout | | 1,193 | 73.6 | |
| Registered electors | | 1,621 | | |
| Conservative win (new seat) | | | | |

=== Crockenhill and Well Hill ===
Crockenhill and Well Hill
| Party | Candidate | Votes | % | ±% |
|---|---|---|---|---|
| UKIP | Steve Lindsay | 398 | 34.7 | |
| Conservative | Shanker Gaire | 327 | 28.5 | |
| Labour | Rachel Waterton | 271 | 23.6 | |
| Liberal Democrats | Philip Hobson | 87 | 7.6 | |
| Green | Aliye Batmaz | 63 | 5.5 | |
| Total votes | | 1,146 | | |
| Majority | | 71 | 6.2 | |
| Rejected ballots | | 4 | 4.1 | |
| Turnout | | 1,150 | 73.6 | |
| Registered electors | | 1,563 | | |
| UKIP win (new seat) | | | | |

=== Dunton Green and Riverhead ===
Dunton Green and Riverhead
| Party | Candidate | Votes | % | ±% |
|---|---|---|---|---|
| Conservative | Kim Bailey | 1,410 | 31.4 | |
| Conservative | Cameron Brown | 1,292 | 28.7 | |
| Liberal Democrats | Simon Beard | 383 | 8.5 | |
| No description | Ian Bayley | 376 | 8.4 | |
| Labour | Nick Dineen | 370 | 8.2 | |
| Green | Maya Forth | 346 | 7.7 | |
| Liberal Democrats | Michael Sheridan | 275 | 6.1 | |
| Libertarian | Daniel Welstead | 43 | 1.0 | |
| Total votes | | 4,495 | | |
| Majority | | 909 | 20.2 | |
| Rejected ballots | | 20 | 0.8 | |
| Turnout | | 2,601 | 71.1 | |
| Registered electors | | 3,657 | | |
| Conservative win (new seat) | | | | |
| Conservative win (new seat) | | | | |

=== Edenbridge North and East ===
Edenbridge North and East
| Party | Candidate | Votes | % | ±% |
|---|---|---|---|---|
| Conservative | Stuart McGregor | 1,553 | 36.5 | |
| Conservative | John Scholey | 1,473 | 34.6 | |
| Labour | Kathryn Parish | 621 | 14.6 | |
| Green | Hill Harris | 611 | 14.3 | |
| Total votes | | 4,258 | | |
| Majority | | 852 | 20.0 | |
| Rejected ballots | | 44 | 1.7 | |
| Turnout | | 2,569 | 67.9 | |
| Registered electors | | 3,786 | | |
| Conservative win (new seat) | | | | |
| Conservative win (new seat) | | | | |

=== Edenbridge South and West ===
Edenbridge South and West
| Party | Candidate | Votes | % | ±% |
|---|---|---|---|---|
| Conservative | Margot McArthur | 1,094 | 30.5 | |
| Conservative | Alan Layland | 1,053 | 29.4 | |
| Labour | Bob Howes | 426 | 11.9 | |
| UKIP | Stephen Peddie | 426 | 11.9 | |
| Green | Sue Rule | 298 | 8.3 | |
| Labour | James Parish | 286 | 8.0 | |
| Total votes | | 3,583 | | |
| Majority | | 627 | 17.5 | |
| Rejected ballots | | 18 | 0.9 | |
| Turnout | | 2,107 | 65.7 | |
| Registered electors | | 3,205 | | |
| Conservative win (new seat) | | | | |
| Conservative win (new seat) | | | | |

=== Eynsford ===
Eynsford
| Party | Candidate | Votes | % | ±% |
|---|---|---|---|---|
| Conservative | Michael Horwood | 780 | 70.6 | |
| Labour | Madeleine Marshall | 154 | 13.9 | |
| Liberal Democrats | Tony Clayton | 100 | 9.0 | |
| Green | Sarah Perkins | 71 | 6.4 | |
| Total votes | | 1,105 | | |
| Majority | | 626 | 56.7 | |
| Rejected ballots | | 13 | 1.2 | |
| Turnout | | 1,119 | 75.6 | |
| Registered electors | | 1,481 | | |
| Conservative win (new seat) | | | | |

=== Farningham, Horton Kirby and South Darenth ===
Farningham, Horton Kirby and South Darenth
| Party | Candidate | Votes | % | ±% |
|---|---|---|---|---|
| Conservative | Philip McGarvey | 1,408 | 33.9 | |
| Conservative | Ingrid Chetram | 1,321 | 31.8 | |
| Labour | Kevin Flack | 568 | 13.7 | |
| Green | Hilary Harding | 478 | 11.5 | |
| Labour | Amy McEnroe | 375 | 9.0 | |
| Total votes | | 4,150 | | |
| Majority | | 753 | 18.1 | |
| Rejected ballots | | 0 | 0.0 | |
| Turnout | | 2,672 | 69.4 | |
| Registered electors | | 3,848 | | |
| Conservative win (new seat) | | | | |
| Conservative win (new seat) | | | | |

=== Fawkham and West Kingsdown ===
Fawkham and West Kingsdown
| Party | Candidate | Votes | % | ±% |
|---|---|---|---|---|
| Conservative | Faye Parkin | 1,729 | 24.4 | |
| Conservative | Ian Bosley | 1,664 | 23.5 | |
| Conservative | Pat Bosley | 1,636 | 23.1 | |
| Green | Christopher Russell | 527 | 7.4 | |
| Labour | James Weekes | 514 | 7.3 | |
| Labour | John Smifey | 508 | 7.2 | |
| Green | Mark Lindop | 506 | 7.1 | |
| Total votes | | 7,084 | | |
| Majority | | 1109 | 15.7 | |
| Rejected ballots | | 88 | 2.6 | |
| Turnout | | 3,368 | 69.1 | |
| Registered electors | | 4,875 | | |
| Conservative win (new seat) | | | | |
| Conservative win (new seat) | | | | |
| Conservative win (new seat) | | | | |

=== Halstead, Knockholt and Badgers Mount ===
Halstead, Knockholt and Badgers Mount
| Party | Candidate | Votes | % | ±% |
|---|---|---|---|---|
| Conservative | John Grint | Unopposed | | |
| Conservative | Gary Williamson | Unopposed | | |
| Conservative win (new seat) | | | | |
| Conservative win (new seat) | | | | |

=== Hartley and Hodsoll Street ===
Hartley and Hodsoll Street
| Party | Candidate | Votes | % | ±% |
|---|---|---|---|---|
| Conservative | James Gaywood | 2,380 | 30.4 | |
| Conservative | Larry Abraham | 2,272 | 29.0 | |
| Conservative | John Kelly | 1,921 | 24.6 | |
| UKIP | Vince Sewell | 1250 | 16.0 | |
| Total votes | | 7,823 | | |
| Majority | | 671 | 8.6 | |
| Rejected ballots | | 121 | 3.3 | |
| Turnout | | 3,626 | 75.1 | |
| Registered electors | | 4,826 | | |
| Conservative win (new seat) | | | | |
| Conservative win (new seat) | | | | |
| Conservative win (new seat) | | | | |

=== Hextable ===
Hextable
| Party | Candidate | Votes | % | ±% |
|---|---|---|---|---|
| Conservative | Dee Morris | 1,237 | 32.1 | |
| Independent | Darren Kitchener | 1,089 | 28.2 | |
| Conservative | John Pike | 835 | 21.6 | |
| Labour | Melvyn George | 394 | 10.2 | |
| Green | Phil Levy | 303 | 7.9 | |
| Total votes | | 3,858 | | |
| Majority | | 254 | 6.6 | |
| Rejected ballots | | 28 | 1.2 | |
| Turnout | | 2,433 | 72.5 | |
| Registered electors | | 3,354 | | |
| Conservative win (new seat) | | | | |
| Independent win (new seat) | | | | |

=== Kemsing ===
Kemsing
| Party | Candidate | Votes | % | ±% |
|---|---|---|---|---|
| Conservative | Simon Reay | 1,155 | 30.1 | |
| Conservative | Lorraine Stack | 1,090 | 28.4 | |
| Liberal Democrats | Margaret Robarts | 706 | 18.4 | |
| UKIP | Roger Williams | 596 | 15.5 | |
| Liberal Democrats | Richard Wassell | 289 | 7.5 | |
| Total votes | | 3,836 | | |
| Majority | | 384 | 10.0 | |
| Rejected ballots | | 24 | 1.0 | |
| Turnout | | 2,464 | 73.9 | |
| Registered electors | | 3,333 | | |
| Conservative win (new seat) | | | | |
| Conservative win (new seat) | | | | |

=== Leigh and Chiddingstone Causeway ===
Leigh and Chiddingstone Causeway
| Party | Candidate | Votes | % | ±% |
|---|---|---|---|---|
| Conservative | Peter Lake | Unopposed | | |
| Conservative win (new seat) | | | | |

=== Otford and Shoreham ===
Otford and Shoreham
| Party | Candidate | Votes | % | ±% |
|---|---|---|---|---|
| Conservative | Michelle Lowe | 1,416 | 29.4 | |
| Conservative | John Edwards-Winser | 1,357 | 28.1 | |
| UKIP | Chris Heath | 500 | 10.4 | |
| Green | Philip Otto | 322 | 6.7 | |
| Liberal Democrats | Alistair Macpherson | 304 | 6.3 | |
| Green | Philip Dodd | 293 | 6.1 | |
| Labour | Colin Baker | 235 | 4.9 | |
| Labour | Nevile Fourie | 198 | 4.1 | |
| Liberal Democrats | Lise Michaelides | 198 | 4.1 | |
| Total votes | | 4,823 | | |
| Majority | | 857 | 17.8 | |
| Rejected ballots | | 14 | 0.5 | |
| Turnout | | 2,755 | 77.0 | |
| Registered electors | | 3,580 | | |
| Conservative win (new seat) | | | | |
| Conservative win (new seat) | | | | |

=== Penhurst, Fordcombe and Chiddingstone ===
Penhurst, Fordcombe and Chiddingstone
| Party | Candidate | Votes | % | ±% |
|---|---|---|---|---|
| Conservative | Paddy Cooke | 790 | 53.3 | |
| Liberal Democrats | Richard Streatfield | 501 | 33.8 | |
| Green | Joy Rosendale | 191 | 12.9 | |
| Total votes | | 1,482 | | |
| Majority | | 289 | 19.5 | |
| Rejected ballots | | 23 | 1.5 | |
| Turnout | | 1,506 | 75.4 | |
| Registered electors | | 1,998 | | |
| Conservative win (new seat) | | | | |

=== Seal and Weald ===
Seal and Weald
| Party | Candidate | Votes | % | ±% |
|---|---|---|---|---|
| Conservative | Julia Thornton | 1,363 | 34.8 | |
| Conservative | Roddy Hogarth | 1,351 | 34.5 | |
| Liberal Democrats | Andrew Michaelides | 443 | 11.3 | |
| Liberal Democrats | Robert Hudson | 380 | 9.7 | |
| Green | Linda Walker | 376 | 9.6 | |
| Total votes | | 3,913 | | |
| Majority | | 908 | 23.2 | |
| Rejected ballots | | 34 | 1.5 | |
| Turnout | | 2,297 | 72.1 | |
| Registered electors | | 3,187 | | |
| Conservative win (new seat) | | | | |
| Conservative win (new seat) | | | | |

=== Sevenoaks Eastern ===
Sevenoaks Eastern
| Party | Candidate | Votes | % | ±% |
|---|---|---|---|---|
| Liberal Democrats | Elizabeth Purves | 951 | 27.2 | |
| Conservative | Edward Parson | 792 | 22.6 | |
| Liberal Democrats | Roger Walshe | 711 | 20.3 | |
| Conservative | Stephen Arnold | 636 | 18.2 | |
| Green | John Cornwell | 408 | 11.7 | |
| Total votes | | 3,498 | | |
| Majority | | 81 | 2.3 | |
| Rejected ballots | | 43 | 2.0 | |
| Turnout | | 2,117 | 69.5 | |
| Registered electors | | 3,044 | | |
| Liberal Democrats win (new seat) | | | | |
| Conservative win (new seat) | | | | |

=== Sevenoaks Kippington ===
Sevenoaks Kippington
| Party | Candidate | Votes | % | ±% |
|---|---|---|---|---|
| Conservative | Avril Hunter | 1,846 | 39.2 | |
| Conservative | Andrew Eyre | 1,845 | 39.1 | |
| Green | Chelsea Hodkinson | 322 | 6.8 | |
| Green | Steve Plater | 263 | 5.6 | |
| Labour | Thomas Geldard | 248 | 5.3 | |
| Labour | Theodore Michael | 191 | 4.1 | |
| Total votes | | 4,715 | | |
| Majority | | 1,523 | 32.3 | |
| Rejected ballots | | 43 | 1.6 | |
| Turnout | | 2,730 | 74.5 | |
| Registered electors | | 3,664 | | |
| Conservative win (new seat) | | | | |
| Conservative win (new seat) | | | | |

=== Sevenoaks Northern ===
Sevenoaks Northern
| Party | Candidate | Votes | % | ±% |
|---|---|---|---|---|
| Conservative | Jonathan Krogdahl | 954 | 25.9 | |
| Liberal Democrats | Merilyn Canet | 952 | 25.9 | |
| Conservative | Paul Towell | 927 | 25.2 | |
| Liberal Democrats | Iain Porter | 844 | 23.0 | |
| Total votes | | 3,677 | | |
| Majority | | 25 | 0.7 | |
| Rejected ballots | | 72 | 3.3 | |
| Turnout | | 2,180 | 67.6 | |
| Registered electors | | 3,226 | | |
| Conservative win (new seat) | | | | |
| Liberal Democrats win (new seat) | | | | |

=== Sevenoaks Town and St John's ===
Sevenoaks Town and St John's
| Party | Candidate | Votes | % | ±% |
|---|---|---|---|---|
| Conservative | Peter Fleming | 1,726 | 21.1 | |
| Conservative | Simon Raikes | 1,608 | 19.7 | |
| Conservative | Graham Clack | 1,537 | 18.8 | |
| Liberal Democrats | Sue Camp | 840 | 10.3 | |
| Liberal Democrats | Fay Margo | 808 | 9.9 | |
| Liberal Democrats | Doreen Kinsler | 689 | 8.4 | |
| Green | John Harris | 585 | 7.2 | |
| UKIP | Brian Shirreff | 383 | 4.7 | |
| Total votes | | 8,176 | | |
| Majority | | 697 | 8.5 | |
| Rejected ballots | | 37 | 1.1 | |
| Turnout | | 3,389 | 69.7 | |
| Registered electors | | 4,859 | | |
| Conservative win (new seat) | | | | |
| Conservative win (new seat) | | | | |
| Conservative win (new seat) | | | | |

=== Swanley Christchurch and Swanley Village ===
Swanley Christchurch and Swanley Village
| Party | Candidate | Votes | % | ±% |
|---|---|---|---|---|
| Conservative | John Barnes | 1,792 | 23.6 | |
| Conservative | Simon Raikes | 1,564 | 20.6 | |
| Conservative | Graham Clack | 1,557 | 20.5 | |
| Labour | Gillian Fittock | 862 | 11.4 | |
| Labour | Ngozi Marsh | 704 | 9.3 | |
| Labour | Collins Fadare | 699 | 9.2 | |
| Green | Brian Thomas | 400 | 5.3 | |
| Total votes | | 7,578 | | |
| Majority | | 695 | 9.2 | |
| Rejected ballots | | 51 | 1.7 | |
| Turnout | | 3,074 | 69.0 | |
| Registered electors | | 4,457 | | |
| Conservative win (new seat) | | | | |
| Conservative win (new seat) | | | | |
| Conservative win (new seat) | | | | |

=== Swanley St Mary's ===
Swanley St Mary's
| Party | Candidate | Votes | % | ±% |
|---|---|---|---|---|
| Conservative | Lesley Dyball | 729 | 25.5 | |
| Labour | Michael Hogg | 618 | 21.6 | |
| Conservative | Ray Morris | 614 | 21.5 | |
| Labour | Elizabeth Komolafe | 595 | 20.8 | |
| Independent Voice - Community Focus | John Underwood | 300 | 10.5 | |
| Total votes | | 2,856 | | |
| Majority | | 4 | 0.1 | |
| Rejected ballots | | 51 | 2.9 | |
| Turnout | | 1,757 | 55.3 | |
| Registered electors | | 3,176 | | |
| Conservative win (new seat) | | | | |
| Labour win (new seat) | | | | |

=== Swanley White Oak ===
Swanley White Oak
| Party | Candidate | Votes | % | ±% |
|---|---|---|---|---|
| Conservative | Laurence Ball | 1,166 | 17.5 | |
| Conservative | Nina Rosen | 1,098 | 16.5 | |
| Conservative | James Halford | 1,080 | 16.2 | |
| Labour | Mark Fittock | 694 | 10.4 | |
| Labour | Joanne Frawley | 679 | 10.2 | |
| Labour | Angela George | 670 | 10.0 | |
| Independent Voice - Community Focus | Janet Sargeant | 509 | 7.6 | |
| Green | Robert Woodbridge | 282 | 4.2 | |
| Green | John Jones | 262 | 3.9 | |
| Green | Shen Batmaz | 229 | 3.4 | |
| Total votes | | 6,669 | | |
| Majority | | 386 | 5.8 | |
| Rejected ballots | | 54 | 2.0 | |
| Turnout | | 2,725 | 57.4 | |
| Registered electors | | 4,746 | | |
| Conservative win (new seat) | | | | |
| Conservative win (new seat) | | | | |
| Conservative win (new seat) | | | | |

=== Westerham and Crockham Hill ===
Westerham and Crockham Hill
| Party | Candidate | Votes | % | ±% |
|---|---|---|---|---|
| Conservative | Kevin Maskell | 1,115 | 29.7 | |
| Conservative | Diana Esler | 990 | 26.4 | |
| UKIP | Carol Mackay | 573 | 15.3 | |
| Labour | Neil Proudfoot | 414 | 11.0 | |
| Green | Amelie Boleyn | 337 | 9.0 | |
| Independent | Anthony Holman | 325 | 8.7 | |
| Total votes | | 3,754 | | |
| Majority | | 417 | 11.1 | |
| Rejected ballots | | 25 | 1.0 | |
| Turnout | | 2,481 | 72.1 | |
| Registered electors | | 3,443 | | |
| Conservative win (new seat) | | | | |
| Conservative win (new seat) | | | | |
