= 2019 Sevenoaks District Council election =

2019 local election in England

Map showing the results of the 2019 Sevenoaks Council election

The 2019 Sevenoaks District Council election took place on 2 May 2019 to elect members of Sevenoaks District Council. This was on the same day as other local elections. The entire council (54 seats) was up for election. The result was a reduced majority for the Conservatives (down 3 seats) but was still a large victory. Independents made gains, as did the Liberal Democrats. UKIP lost the 1 seat they had won in 2015. No contest was held in 4 wards (Cowden & Hever, Dunton Green & Riverhead, Leigh & Chiddingstone Causeway, and Penshurst, Fordcombe & Chiddingstone), as the same number of candidates as seats up for election ran.

== Results ==
2019 Sevenoaks District Council election
Party	Candidates	Seats	Gains	Losses	Net gain/loss	Seats %	Votes %	Votes	+/−
Conservative	54	46	0	3	▼3	85.2	58.0	29,055	+3.4
Liberal Democrats	18	3	1	0	▲1	5.6	14.9	7,444	+4.8
Independent	14	2	2	1	▲1	3.7	8.1	4,040	+5.8
Sevenoaks Independent	2	2	2	0	▲2	3.7	2.4	1,227	N/A
Labour	19	1	0	0	Steady	1.9	9.7	4,878	–2.3
Green	10	0	0	0	Steady	0.0	6.5	3,254	–5.9
UKIP	1	0	0	1	▼1	0.0	0.3	171	–6.9
BNP	1	0	0	0	Steady	0.0	0.1	45	N/A

== Results by ward ==
=== Ash and New Ash Green (3 seats) ===
Ash and New Ash Green
Party	Candidate	Votes	%
Conservative	Claire Pearsall	809	27
Conservative	George Pender	724	24
Conservative	Alan Pett	578	19
Green	Barbara Ring	514	17
Labour	Melvyn George	378	13
Turnout		1,354	29
Rejected ballots		22	1.6
Registered electors		4,605	
Conservative hold			
Conservative hold			
Conservative hold			

=== Brasted, Chevening and Sundridge (3 seats) ===
Brasted, Chevening and Sundridge
Party	Candidate	Votes	%
Conservative	Anna Firth	908	23
Conservative	Robert Piper	834	21
Conservative	James London	822	21
Independent	Steve Nash	516	13
Independent	Paulette Furse	474	12
Labour	Alex Walker	332	9
Turnout		1,627	33
Rejected ballots		21	1.3
Registered electors		4,878	
Conservative hold			
Conservative hold			
Conservative hold			

=== Cowden and Hever ===
Cowden and Hever
Party	Candidate	Votes	%
Conservative	Matthew Dickins	N/A	N/A
Turnout		N/A	N/A
Conservative hold			

No contest was held, as only 1 candidate ran for the seat.

=== Crockenhill and Well Hill ===
Crockenhill and Well Hill
Party	Candidate	Votes	%
Independent	Rachel Waterton	205	32
Independent	Stephen Lindsay	187	29
Conservative	Danny Lesage	155	24
Labour	David Griffiths	66	10
Liberal Democrats	Philip Hobson	23	4
Turnout		640	42
Rejected ballots		4	0.6
Registered electors		1,531	
Independent gain from UKIP			

Stephen Lindsay was the sitting councillor having been elected as a UKIP candidate in 2015.

=== Dunton Green and Riverhead (2 seats) ===
Dunton Green and Riverhead
Party	Candidate	Votes	%
Conservative	Kim Bayley	N/A	N/A
Conservative	Cameron Brown	N/A	N/A
Turnout		N/A	N/A
Conservative hold			
Conservative hold			

No contest was held, as only 2 candidates ran for the 2 seats.

=== Edenbridge North and East (2 seats) ===
Edenbridge North and East
Party	Candidate	Votes	%
Conservative	James Barnett	651	31
Conservative	Stuart McGregor	519	25
Liberal Democrats	Alan Damodaran	395	19
Liberal Democrats	Jim Morgan	281	13
Labour	Richard Williams	253	12
Turnout		1,164	32
Rejected ballots		24	2.1
Registered electors		3,685	
Conservative hold			
Conservative hold			

=== Edenbridge South and West (2 seats) ===
Edenbridge South and West
Party	Candidate	Votes	%
Conservative	Margot McArthur	435	23
Conservative	Alan Layland	423	23
Liberal Democrats	Jon Aldridge	409	22
Independent	Stephen Peddie	397	21
Liberal Democrats	Richard Streatfeild	215	11
Turnout		1,064	34
Rejected ballots		19	1.8
Registered electors		3,172	
Conservative hold			
Conservative hold			

=== Eynsford ===
Eynsford
Party	Candidate	Votes	%
Conservative	Alan Cheeseman	266	52
Green	Michael Barker	249	48
Turnout		518	35
Rejected ballots		3	0.6
Registered electors		1,496	
Conservative hold			

=== Farningham, Horton Kirby and South Darenth (2 seats) ===
Farningham, Horton Kirby and South Darenth
Party	Candidate	Votes	%
Conservative	Philip McGarvey	557	31
Conservative	Brian Carroll	552	31
Liberal Democrats	Tristan Ward	383	21
Liberal Democrats	Laura Covill	294	16
Turnout		985	26
Rejected ballots		26	2.6
Registered electors		3,805	
Conservative hold			
Conservative hold			

=== Fawkham and West Kingsdown (3 seats) ===
Fawkham and West Kingsdown
Party	Candidate	Votes	%
Conservative	Lynda Harrison	661	24
Independent	Maxine Fothergill	650	23
Conservative	Faye Parkin	590	21
Conservative	Mike Pearsall	507	18
Green	Mark Lindop	382	14
Turnout		1,372	28
Rejected ballots		21	1.5
Registered electors		4,916	
Conservative hold			
Independent gain from Conservative			
Conservative hold			

=== Halstead, Knockholt and Badgers Mount (2 seats) ===
Halstead, Knockholt and Badgers Mount
Party	Candidate	Votes	%
Conservative	Gary Williamson	754	41
Conservative	John Grint	678	37
Labour	Helen Fiorini	200	11
Labour	Margaret Willis	187	10
Turnout		1,032	38
Rejected ballots		41	4.0
Registered electors		2,746	
Conservative hold			
Conservative hold			

=== Hartley and Hodsoll Street (3 seats) ===
Hartley and Hodsoll Street
Party	Candidate	Votes	%
Conservative	Larry Abraham	1,023	28
Conservative	Penny Cole	959	27
Conservative	Perry Cole	878	24
Green	Sue Hodge	408	11
Green	James Macdonald	336	9
Turnout		1,398	29
Rejected ballots		32	2.3
Registered electors		4,801	
Conservative hold			
Conservative hold			
Conservative hold			

=== Hextable (2 seats) ===
Hextable
Party	Candidate	Votes	%
Sevenoaks Independent	Darren Kitchener	687	34
Sevenoaks Independent	Chrissy Hudson	540	26
Independent	John Pike	395	19
Green	Phil Levy	173	8
Conservative	John Kelly	131	6
Conservative	Richard Parry	117	6
Turnout		1,107	34
Rejected ballots		12	1.1
Registered electors		3,287	
Sevenoaks Independent gain from Conservative			
Sevenoaks Independent gain from Independent			

=== Kemsing (2 seats) ===
Kemsing
Party	Candidate	Votes	%
Conservative	Simon Reay	750	41
Conservative	Dee Morris	703	39
Labour	Theodore Michael	207	11
Independent	Chris Haslam	161	9
Turnout		1,114	35
Rejected ballots		33	3.0
Registered electors		3,221	
Conservative hold			
Conservative hold			

=== Leigh and Chiddingstone Causeway ===
Leigh and Chiddingstone Causeway
Party	Candidate	Votes	%
Conservative	James Osborne-Jackson	N/A	N/A
Turnout		N/A	N/A
Conservative hold			

No contest was held, as just 1 candidate ran for the seat.

=== Otford and Shoreham (2 seats) ===
Otford and Shoreham
Party	Candidate	Votes	%
Conservative	John Edwards-Winser	714	32
Conservative	Irene Roy	651	29
Liberal Democrats	Mark Kent	403	18
Labour	Emily Aisher	233	10
Liberal Democrats	Richard Wassell	225	10
Turnout		1,252	35
Rejected ballots		25	2.0
Registered electors		3,531	
Conservative hold			
Conservative hold			

=== Penshurst, Fordcombe and Chiddingstone ===
Penshurst, Fordcombe and Chiddingstone
Party	Candidate	Votes	%
Conservative	Sue Coleman	N/A	N/A
Turnout		N/A	N/A
Conservative hold			

No contest was held, as just 1 candidate ran for the seat.

=== Seal and Weald (2 seats) ===
Seal and Weald
Party	Candidate	Votes	%
Conservative	Julia Thornton	597	39
Conservative	Roddy Hogarth	556	36
Liberal Democrats	Andrew Michaelides	403	42.42
Turnout		961	31
Rejected ballots		11	1.1
Registered electors		3,149	
Conservative hold			
Conservative hold			

=== Sevenoaks Eastern (2 seats) ===
Sevenoaks Eastern
Party	Candidate	Votes	%
Liberal Democrats	Elizabeth Purves	686	33
Liberal Democrats	Tony Clayton	683	33
Conservative	Linden Kemkaren	258	12
Conservative	Jonathan London	241	12
Green	Paul Wharton	204	10
Turnout		1,100	37
Rejected ballots		9	0.8
Registered electors		2,996	
Liberal Democrats hold			
Liberal Democrats gain from Conservative			

=== Sevenoaks Kippington (2 seats) ===
Sevenoaks Kippington
Party	Candidate	Votes	%
Conservative	Avril Hunter	764	37
Conservative	Andrew Eyre	748	37
Liberal Democrats	Doreen Kinsler	531	26
Turnout		1,265	34
Rejected ballots		11	0.9
Registered electors		3,679	
Conservative hold			
Conservative hold			

=== Sevenoaks Northern (2 seats) ===
Sevenoaks Northern
Party	Candidate	Votes	%
Liberal Democrats	Merilyn Canet	555	29
Conservative	Irene Collins	405	21
Conservative	Daniel Rossall-Valentine	394	21
Liberal Democrats	Edward Waite	394	21
Labour	Conor Sewell	145	8
Turnout		1,045	33
Rejected ballots		34	3.3
Registered electors		3,196	
Liberal Democrats hold			
Conservative hold			

=== Sevenoaks Town and St. John's (3 seats) ===
Sevenoaks Town and St. John's
Party	Candidate	Votes	%
Conservative	Peter Fleming	866	17
Conservative	Graham Clack	792	16
Conservative	Simon Raikes	792	16
Liberal Democrats	Lise Michaelides	614	12
Liberal Democrats	Tom Morris	491	10
Liberal Democrats	Gareth Willis	459	9
Green	John Harris	390	8
Green	Heather Styles	351	7
Labour	Jill Griffiths	196	4
Turnout		1,788	37
Rejected ballots		33	1.8
Registered electors		4,861	
Conservative hold			
Conservative hold			
Conservative hold			

=== Swanley Christchurch and Swanley Village (3 seats) ===
Swanley Christchurch and Swanley Village
Party	Candidate	Votes	%
Conservative	Clare Barnes	762	22
Conservative	Laurence Ball	685	20
Conservative	Melissa Foster	505	15
Independent	Tony Searles	383	11
Labour	Mark Fittock	302	9
Labour	Elizabeth Eigbefoh	278	8
Green	Abigail Blumzon	247	7
Labour	Sultan George	226	7
Turnout		1,368	30
Rejected ballots		27	2.0
Registered electors		4,624	
Conservative hold			
Conservative hold			
Conservative hold			

=== Swanley St. Mary's (2 seats) ===
Swanley St. Mary's
Party	Candidate	Votes	%
Conservative	Lesley Dyball	272	20
Labour	Jackie Griffiths	248	19
Conservative	Michael Horwood	235	18
Labour	Ian Rashbrook	229	17
UKIP	Jeremy Southworth	171	13
Independent	Louise Mehmet	76	6
Independent	Maddy Rogers	55	4
BNP	Ron Ball	45	3
Turnout		740	23
Rejected ballots		7	0.9
Registered electors		3,243	
Conservative hold			
Labour hold			

=== Swanley White Oak (3 seats) ===
Swanley White Oak
Party	Candidate	Votes	%
Conservative	Sarah Andrews	555	18
Conservative	Paul Darrington	535	17
Conservative	Glynnis Darrington	517	16
Labour	Angela George	346	11
Labour	Denise Ware	331	11
Labour	Charlie Zahra	319	10
Independent	Nikki Hill	170	5
Independent	Ian Laponder	135	4
Independent	Karen Laponder	130	4
Independent	Albert Venter	106	3
Turnout		1,170	25
Rejected ballots		19	1.6
Registered electors		4,764	
Conservative hold			
Conservative hold			
Conservative hold			

=== Westerham and Crockham Hill (2 seats) ===
Westerham and Crockham Hill
Party	Candidate	Votes	%
Conservative	Diana Esler	626	38
Conservative	Kevin Maskell	601	37
Labour	Neil Proudfoot	402	25
Turnout		1,046	30
Rejected ballots		30	2.9
Registered electors		3,430	
Conservative hold			
Conservative hold			

== Changes 2019–2023 ==
- Anna Firth, the Conservative councillor for Brasted, Chevening and Sundridge since 2011, resigned her seat in February 2022 after being elected as Member of Parliament for Southend West at a by-election held on 3 February 2022.
- Brian Carroll, one of the Conservative councillors for Farningham, Horton Kirby and South Darenth, resigned in November 2022; as his term would have ended at the next ordinary election in May 2023, no by-election was held.
- James Osborne-Jackson, the Conservative councillor for Leigh and Chiddingstone Causeway, resigned in November 2022; as his term would have ended at the next ordinary election in May 2023, no by-election was held.

=== By-elections ===
==== Brasted, Chevening and Sundridge (2021) ====
The by-election was triggered by the resignation of Conservative councillor Robert Piper.

Brasted, Chevening and Sundridge by-election, 6 May 2021
Party	Candidate	Votes	%	±%
Conservative	Keith Bonin	1,051	54	N/A
Liberal Democrats	Sandra Robinson	704	36	N/A
Labour	Neil Proudfoot	182	9	N/A
Majority		347	18	N/A
Turnout		1,948	39	
Registered electors		4,970		
Conservative hold		Swing		

==== Brasted, Chevening and Sundridge (2022) ====
The by-election was triggered by the resignation of Conservative councillor Anna Firth after she was elected as Member of Parliament for Southend West.

Brasted, Chevening and Sundridge by-election, 3 March 2022
Party	Candidate	Votes	%	±%
Conservative	Nigel Williams	820	59	N/A
Liberal Democrats	Clare Coombe	524	38	N/A
Labour	Theo Michael	52	4	N/A
Majority		296	21	N/A
Conservative hold		Swing		

==== Fawkham and West Kingsdown ====
The by-election was triggered by the death of Conservative councillor Faye Parkin.

Fawkham and West Kingsdown by-election, 5 May 2022
Party	Candidate	Votes	%	±%
Conservative	Emily Bulford	892	71	N/A
Labour	Jordan Selvey	202	16	N/A
Liberal Democrats	Tristan Ward	156	12	N/A
Majority		690	55	N/A
Turnout		1,260	26	
Registered electors		4,834		
Conservative hold		Swing		

==== Penshurst, Fordcombe and Chiddingstone ====
The by-election followed Susan Coleman's departure from the council after moving to Rutland.

Penshurst, Fordcombe and Chiddingstone by-election, 9 June 2022
Party	Candidate	Votes	%	±%
Liberal Democrats	Richard Streatfeild	343	54	N/A
Conservative	Ian Butcher	288	46	N/A
Majority		55	9	N/A
Turnout		632	33	
Registered electors		1,926		
Liberal Democrats gain from Conservative		Swing		
