= Red Flare =

British anti-fascist research group

- Purpose: Anti-fascism research
- Location: United Kingdom
- Website: redflare.info

Red Flare is a British anti-fascist research group.

== Organisation ==
The group researches fascist and ethnonationalist hate groups, documents their activities, infiltrates their events and provides training to anti-fascist researchers.

== Activities ==
In 2020, the group highlighted how former Liberal Democrat candidate Nick Hill became radicalised into a far-right organiser. In 2022, the group exposed the anti-semitism and racism of journalist and YouTuber James Owens. In 2023, the group documented the fracturing of far-right group Patriotic Alternative into Homeland.

In 2024, the grouped leaked a number of messages from a far-right Telegram group chat in which a number of immigration-related charities, advice centres and solicitors were named as targets in the 2024 riots across the United Kingdom.

== See also ==
- Hope Not Hate
- Searchlight (magazine)
