= The Walk-In (TV series) =

2022 British true crime drama series

- Genre: Drama
- Written by: Jeff Pope
- Directed by: Paul Andrew Williams
- Starring: Stephen Graham; Andrew Ellis; Dean-Charles Chapman; Andrew Havill
- Composer: Lindsay Wright
- Country of origin: United Kingdom
- Original language: English
- No. of series: 1
- No. of episodes: 5

Production
- Executive producers: Tom Dunbar; Stephen Graham; Jeff Pope; Paul Andrew Williams
- Producer: Jo Johnson
- Running time: 45–50 minutes
- Production company: ITV Studios

Original release
- Network: ITV
- Release: 3 October – 31 October 2022

The Walk-In is a five-part 2022 British true crime television series dramatising the infiltration of far-right terrorist group National Action, foiling a plot to murder an MP. It stars Stephen Graham.

== Synopsis ==
The series is based on the true story of how Matthew Collins of activist group Hope not Hate infiltrated British neo-Nazi terrorist group National Action, foiling a plot to assassinate Labour MP Rosie Cooper.

Jack Renshaw was convicted and sentenced to life imprisonment for his plan to kill Cooper.

== Production ==
The series, made by ITV Studios, was written by Jeff Pope and directed by Paul Andrew Williams for ITV.

== Cast ==
- Stephen Graham as Matthew Collins
- Andrew Ellis as Robbie Mullen, the informant
- Dean-Charles Chapman as Jack Renshaw
- Leanne Best as Alison, Matthew's wife
- Jason Flemyng as Nick Lowles, chief executive of Hope Not Hate
- Chris Coghill as Chris Lythgoe
- Bobby Schofield as Matt Hankinson
- Dean Lennox Kelly as Renshaw’s Father
- Nicola Stephenson as Renshaw’s Mother
- Steven Miller as Young Lenny
- David Hayman as Older Lenny
- Remy Beasley as DC Victoria Henderson
- Brendan O'Carroll as Uncle Ronnie
- Andrew Havill as Mr. Atkinson
- Bryony Corrigan as Jo Cox

== Release ==
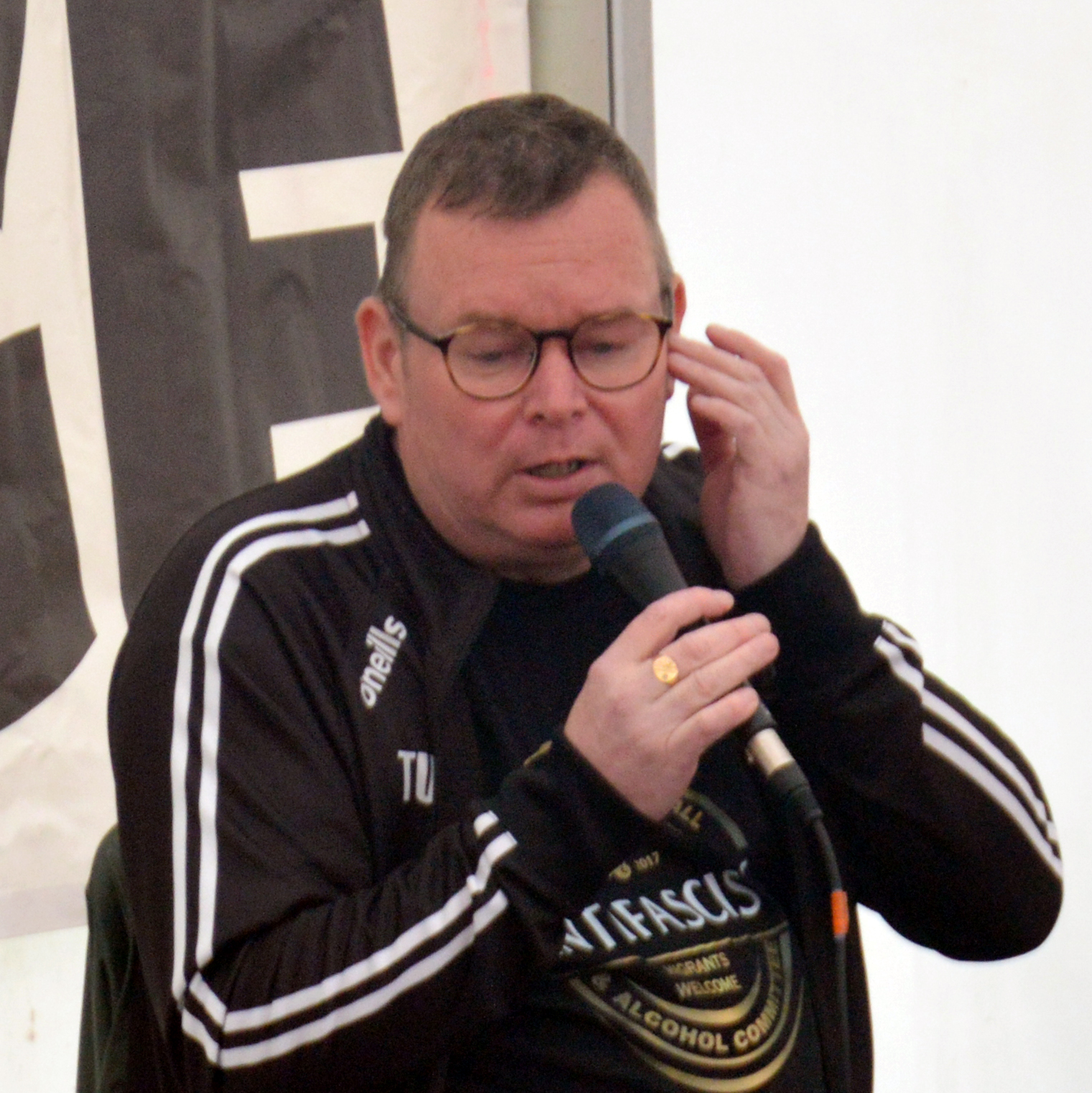
The series is based on Matthew F. Collins' life.

The Walk-In aired on ITV from 3 October 2022.

The documentary Nazi Hunters: The Real Walk-In was broadcast following the final episode.

== Critical reception ==
The Walk In was well received in the press with The Guardian, The Independent, and the Evening Standard all giving it four stars out of five. Lucy Mangan, writing in The Guardian, described it as “one of the best TV investments you can make”.

Cooper was critical of the marketing of the show, saying that she felt that she had been used as a "marketing tool" by Hope Not Hate and ITV.
