= Paul Golding =

Political party leader of Britain First (born 1982)

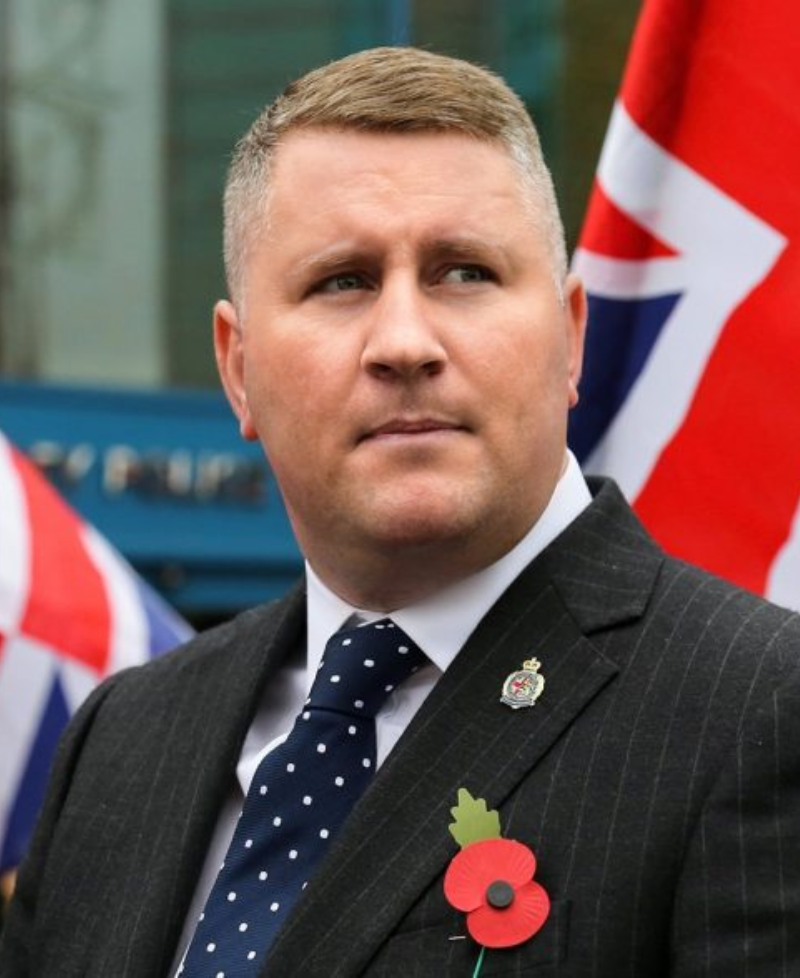
- Golding at a Britain First rally in 2017

Leader of Britain First
- Incumbent
- Assumed office 2014 Serving with Ashlea Simon (2024–2026)
- Deputy: Jayda Fransen (2014–2019)

Member of Sevenoaks District Council
- In office 2009–2011
- Ward: St Mary's
- Preceded by: Michael Hogg
- Succeeded by: Michael Hogg

Personal details
- Born: Paul Anthony Golding; 25 January 1982 (age 44) Kent, England
- Party: Britain First (2011–present)
- Other political affiliations: BNP (1997–2011); National Front (previously)

Paul Anthony Golding (born 25 January 1982) is a British far-right political leader who has served as the leader of Britain First, a British fascist and neo-fascist political party and hate group formed in 2011 by former members of the British National Party (BNP). The group was founded by Jim Dowson, an anti-abortion and far-right campaigner. He grew up in Erith.

In December 2016, Golding was sentenced to eight weeks in prison for violating a court order that prohibited him from entering a mosque or encouraging others to do so in England and Wales. During his absence, Jayda Fransen, the deputy leader, temporarily assumed leadership of the party.

On 7 March 2018, Golding and Fransen were both convicted and imprisoned for harassment. These convictions were related to their actions and statements targeting religious minorities, particularly Muslims.

== Political career ==
=== British National Party ===
Golding was a British National Party (BNP) Sevenoaks District councillor for St Mary's Ward in Swanley from 2009 to 2011. He was also a communications officer for the party. He stood as BNP candidate for Sevenoaks in the 2010 general election, and received 2.8% of the vote. In 2008, it was reported that Golding had been expelled from the BNP for physically attacking Lawrence Rustem, a BNP Barking Borough Council councillor who is half-Turkish. Golding had previously been a member of the neo-Nazi National Front and once attended a Cenotaph on Remembrance Sunday wearing women's underwear on his head.

=== Britain First ===
He stood in the 2014 local elections and as a Britain First lead candidate in the 2014 European Parliamentary election for Wales; the party received 0.9% of the vote. As leader of Britain First Golding made it into the leading anti-Muslim, counter-jihad street movement.

In May 2015, Golding threatened to bury a pig at the site of proposed mosque in Dudley, mistakenly believing this would contaminate the site and render it unsuitable. At the Britain First Annual Conference in November 2015, Golding and his then deputy, Jayda Fransen, led the meeting which agreed a number of policies including banning the media from using the word 'racism' and abolishing the BBC.

Golding stood as a candidate in the London mayoral election in 2016. He came eighth with 31,372 votes (1.2% of those cast) while Labour's Sadiq Khan was elected as mayor. During Khan's victory speech, he turned his back on the newly elected mayor. Golding denied that his protest was racially motivated, saying: "I turned my back on his because he's a vile man. The extreme left lunatic fringe of Labour have taken over with Corbyn." He was also the second-placed candidate on the regional list for the concurrent London Assembly election, though the party finished ninth overall with 1.5% of all votes cast.

In June 2020, Golding spoke at a far-right protest in central London.

In April 2023, he announced his candidacy for the May local elections, standing in the Swanscombe ward on Dartford Borough Council. Golding came last out of all candidates, receiving 107 votes.

=== Conservative Party ===
In December 2019, Golding announced that he was a paid-up member of the Bexleyheath and Crayford Conservative Association. He explained that he intended to "help solidify Boris Johnson's control on the leadership, so we can achieve Brexit and hopefully cut immigration and confront radical Islam". Shortly after the announcement, a Tory spokeswoman said that "Paul Golding's application for membership of the Conservative Party has not been approved." In January 2020, Golding released a letter that he had received from the Conservative Party, informing him that his membership had been rejected.

== Legal issues ==
In May 2014, Golding was arrested for criminal damage and breach of the peace during an Al-Muhajiroun protest outside the Indian High Commission in London. In July 2014, he tried to have himself arrested at Bexleyheath police station over an incident at Crayford Mosque, but failed, an act widely considered to be a fund-raising publicity stunt.

In August 2014, the Advertising Standards Authority accused Britain First of illegally using an image of the royal crown in its logo, ordering all images of the crown to be removed from Britain First's official website, marketing materials and merchandise "with immediate effect". Golding responded by calling the ASA a "toothless quango with no power which no one takes any notice of" and refused to change Britain First's logo.

In March 2015, he was arrested on suspicion of assault during a Britain First march in Derby, as was an opponent who Golding had claimed assaulted him. Also in 2015, Golding was convicted of harassing a woman, after mistakenly arriving at her home instead of that of a man allegedly linked to the 2005 London bombings. He was also found guilty of wearing a political uniform, an offence under the Public Order Act 1936. A restraining order was issued against Golding and he was fined for both offences.

In September 2017, Golding and acting leader Jayda Fransen were arrested and charged with religious harassment. They were both bailed to appear before Medway magistrates in October 2017. Their arrests followed an investigation by Kent Police into the distribution of leaflets in the Thanet and Canterbury areas, and the posting of online videos during a trial at Canterbury Crown Court in May 2017.

=== December 2016 arrest and resignation ===
In December 2016, Golding was sentenced to eight weeks in prison for breaching a court order banning him from entering a mosque or encouraging others to do so in England and Wales. Nine days after the imposition of the court injunction, Golding drove others to a mosque in Cardiff; they entered and mosque members found their behaviour provocative and unnerving. They feared the situation could have escalated if prayers had still been going on.

According to Searchlight, leadership of Britain First was passed on to the former deputy leader Jayda Fransen in November 2016. Fransen said that Golding was taking six months leave as leader of the organisation "to address some important, personal family issues".

The satirical news web site, The Rochdale Herald, capitalised on the incident by inviting readers to sponsor his incarceration to raise money for refugees.

On 7 November 2017, Golding was sentenced to a 120-day suspended prison sentence and ordered to carry out 200 hours of unpaid community work by Sevenoaks Magistrates' Court after admitting a charge of assault by beating. He was also told to pay £750 compensation to his victim, plus £115 victim surcharge and £85 prosecution costs. Summing up, magistrate Alan Austen described it as "a really nasty and vicious assault in a public place".

=== 2017 arrest ===
In December 2017, on a reported visit to Belfast to support Jayda Fransen, Golding was arrested by the Police Service of Northern Ireland for a speech he gave in the city in August, and was later charged.

=== 2018 conviction ===
On 7 March 2018, Fransen and Golding were found guilty of religiously aggravated harassment at Folkestone Magistrates' Court, as a result of an investigation concerning the distribution of leaflets in 2017 in the Thanet and Canterbury areas. The pair were convicted over an incident at a takeaway in Ramsgate, Kent, during which Fransen screamed “paedophile” and “foreigner”, while Fransen was also convicted for approaching a mistaken address she believed to belong to a Muslim defendant on a rape trial. They were both sentenced to prison, with 9 months for Fransen and 18 weeks for Golding.

=== 2018 arrest ===
In November 2018, Golding was charged with a number of offences related to anti-immigration leaflets distributed in Ballymena, County Antrim, and was charged with three counts of publishing written material intended to stir up hatred and one count of using threatening, abusive, insulting words or behaviour. In June 2019, he was sentenced to three months' imprisonment, suspended for two years.

=== 2020 terrorism conviction ===
In February 2020, Golding was charged under the Terrorism Act for refusing to provide police at Heathrow Airport with the PIN codes for his phone and computer. Golding was stopped at Heathrow airport in October 2019, while returning from a trip to the Russian parliament, by officers from the Metropolitan Police's counter-terrorism command. He was subsequently sentenced to a conditional discharge for nine months and ordered to pay a £21 victim surcharge and £750 in costs.

== Alleged sex attack ==
In late 2017, accusations were made against Golding by a young woman, who attended one of the group rallies protesting against the sexual abuse of young girls, that Golding had sexually abused her. Graham Morris, a former Britain First member, had claimed that the deputy leader, Jayda Fransen, had encouraged the victim to stay quiet, saying, "I can give everything you need, a platform. I'll do this for you, that for you." On 11 July 2018, the Greater Manchester Police dropped the case.

== Donald Trump retweets ==
On 29 November 2017, US president Donald Trump retweeted three anti-Muslim videos shared by Jayda Fransen on her Twitter account supporting her views. Three weeks later, on 18 December, Twitter suspended the accounts of Golding, Fransen and Britain First for inciting racial hatred. They later joined and asked their followers to go to the Gab social networking service created as an alternative to social networks like Facebook, Twitter and Reddit. In 2023, Golding and Britain First were unblocked on Twitter.

== Elections contested ==
UK general elections

Date of election	Constituency	Party	Votes	%	Result
2010	Sevenoaks	BNP	1,384	2.8	Not elected

European Parliament elections

Year	Region	Party	Votes	%	Result	Notes
2014	Wales	Britain First	6,633	0.9	Not elected	Multi member constituencies; party list

London mayoral election

Year	Party	Votes	%	Result
2016	Britain First	31,372	1.2	Not elected
2024	Britain First	20,519	0.8	Not elected

London Assembly election

Year	Party	Votes	%	Result
2024	Britain First	32,085	1.3	Not elected
