= Kenny Smith (activist) =

Scottish far-right activist (born 1972/73)

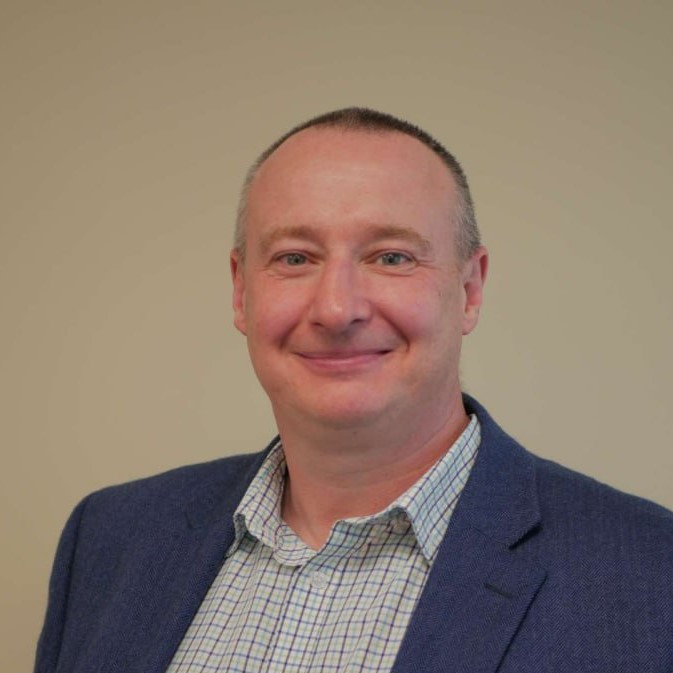
- Smith in 2023

Chairman of the Homeland Party
- Incumbent
- Assumed office May 2023
- Preceded by: Position established

Personal details
- Born: Kenneth Smith; 1971 or 1972 (age 53–54) Isle of Lewis, Scotland
- Party: Homeland (since 2023)
- Other political affiliations: Patriotic Alternative (2019–2023); British National Party (1991–2007)
- Domestic partner: Claire Ellis

Kenneth Smith (born 1971 or 1972) is a Scottish far-right activist who held senior roles in the fascist British National Party (BNP) and neo-Nazi Patriotic Alternative (PA), before founding the white-nationalist Homeland Party in 2023 after splitting-off from PA.

He has worked as a part-time sports coach and in the tourism industry in the Isle of Skye.

== Politics and views ==
Smith became active in politics when he went to a British National Party meeting in Glasgow in 1991. During his membership of the BNP, he ran as a political candidate, winning 135 votes (0.9% of the 15,496 votes) in the Springburn district in the 2007 Glasgow City Council election. He distributed British National Party flyers at an anti-abortion event led by Ian Paisley of the Democratic Unionist Party in Stornoway in 1998. Smith became the head of administration for the BNP.

In 2008, Smith was one of several people sued by British National Party (BNP) leader Nick Griffin after Smith was ejected by the BNP and started the enoughisenoughnick blog. Other defendants included his now ex-wife Nicholla Smith. Until then Nicholla was the BNP organiser for Falkirk and Kenny was the Scottish regional organiser and head of administration.

After being ejected from the British National Party, Smith joined the Patriotic Alternative and became the group's Scottish organiser during the late 2010s. In April 2023, Smith disagreed with the leadership of Patriotic Alternative, left the organisation, and founded the Homeland Party.

Smith runs Claymore Books, which has been described by Patriotic Alternative as a "publishing house run by nationalists for the nationalist community".

Smith founded Patriotic Alternative's fascist fitness club with Kristofer Kearney, and has appeared on Kearney and Ashley Podsiad-Sharp's The Absolute State of Britain (TASOB) podcast, founded by Sharp, which "has consistently featured explicit racism, misogyny, anti-Semitism, Holocaust denial, veneration of Hitler, and apologism for Nazi atrocities and right-wing terrorism." Both Kearney and Podsiad-Sharp have been convicted and sentenced to prison for possessing and disseminating terrorist material.

== Career and personal life ==
Smith is from the Isle of Lewis in Scotland and was born in 1972 or 1973.

He has worked as a part-time children's sport coach and the manager of tourist accommodation on the Isle of Skye.

In 2022, he pled guilty at the Portree Sheriff Court to breaches of the Firearms Act 1968 and received an admonition. Smith lives in Broadford, Skye.

Smith is engaged to Claire Ellis, a native of Slough who was an organiser for Patriotic Alternative's southwest branch while she was in Devon. In May 2022, Ellis said she would move to Scotland so she could "start a new life" with Smith. They were engaged at a Patriotic Alternative conference in Scotland later that year. According to The Herald, Ellis and far-right streamer Jody Swingler are founders of a Skye-based soap company, Clean & Pure, with white nationalist links.
