= Patriotic Alternative =

British far-right group

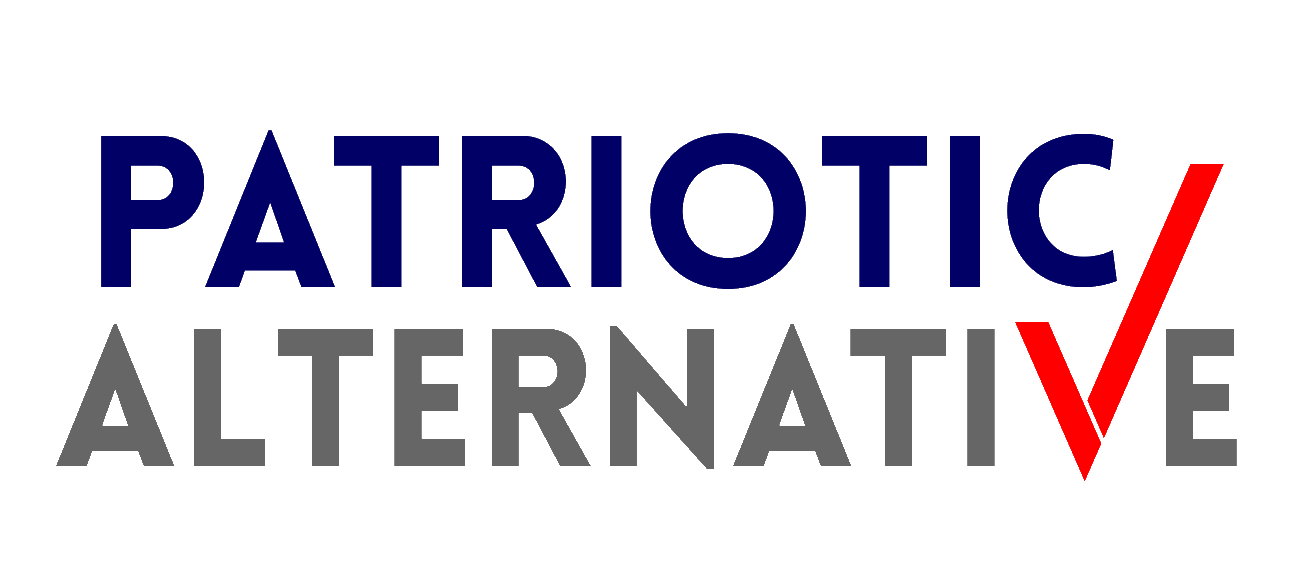
- Abbreviation: PA
- Leader: Mark Collett
- Deputy leader: Laura Tyrie (aka Laura Towler)
- Founded: July 2019
- Membership (2025): c. 500
- Ideology: Fascism; Neo-Nazism; White nationalism
- Political position: Far-right
- Colours: Red White Blue

Party flag

Website
- patrioticalternative.org.uk

Patriotic Alternative (PA) is a British far-right group which states that it has active branches nationwide. The Times described it in 2023 as "Britain's largest far-right white supremacist movement". Its stance has been variously described as Islamophobic, fascist and racist. According to Hope Not Hate, splits, especially the 2023 creation of the Homeland Party that did go on to eclipse it, had pushed PA into decline. However, after the gradual death of the Homeland Party, the group has since been rejuvenated. As of April 2025, PA had around 500 members.

== Political views ==
Patriotic Alternative promotes a white nationalist ideology and aims to combat the "replacement and displacement" of white British people by immigrants who "have no right to these lands". They support the deportation of people of "migrant descent" and would offer financially incentivised repatriation for "those of immigrant descent who have obtained British passports". Patriotic Alternative opposes all immigration unless immigrants have a shared cultural and ethnic background or can prove British ancestry.

According to Hope not Hate, members of Patriotic Alternative have supported political violence, the white genocide conspiracy theory, and Holocaust denial. They have targeted the LGBT community as being a danger to young children. Patriotic Alternative opposes Black Lives Matter and has displayed White Lives Matter banners around the UK, including on the top of Mam Tor, a hill in Derbyshire. Hope not Hate say that the group generally admires Vladimir Putin's Russia for its "illiberalism, anti-Westernism and authoritarianism". The group also includes a "cohort of anti-vaxxers".

== History ==
Patriotic Alternative was founded in July 2019 by the British neo-Nazi and antisemitic conspiracy theorist Mark Collett, the former director of publicity of the British National Party. In September 2019, PA held its first conference, with Edward Dutton and Colin Robertson giving speeches, among others.

In October 2020, counterterrorism experts reported that extremist far-right groups including Patriotic Alternative were using YouTube to try to recruit people, including children "as young as 12". Later that month, Patriotic Alternative members delivered leaflets to over 1,000 homes in Hull, England, stating that white British people will be a minority in Britain by the 2060s and that the COVID-19 lockdown was an attempt to "take away our freedom".

In December 2020, it was reported that Patriotic Alternative's London regional organiser was Nicholas Hill, a 50-year-old former Liberal Democrat councillor from Catford in South London, known by the online pseudonym "Cornelius". That month, during an appearance by the Labour Party leader Keir Starmer on LBC, a caller referring to herself as "Gemma from Cambridge" put forward the white supremacist Great Replacement conspiracy theory. Starmer was criticised by some for his perceived failure to challenge the caller, who was revealed by investigative group Red Flare to be Jody Swingler, a yoga teacher and Patriotic Alternative activist.

A group called the Antifascist Research Collective infiltrated Patriotic Alternative Scotland's private Telegram group. Working with The Ferret, the Telegram group of around 60 people was found to include people who had been members of, or expressed support for, the Scottish Defence League, the neo-Nazi music group Blood & Honour, the British National Party, the New British Union, the British Union of Fascists and the Scottish Nationalist Society.

In February 2021, the Guardian reported that Patriotic Alternative was running "Call of Duty: Warcraft" (presumably Call of Duty: Warzone) gaming tournaments for its supporters.

Tabatha Stirling of Stirling Publishing wrote a series of articles for Patriotic Alternative under the pen name "Miss Britannia" describing her son's school as "a hellhole for sensible, secure White boys" and said "there is one member of staff who is openly gay, and I mean RuPaul extra gay". On 14 March 2021, author Julie Burchill announced that, with Stirling, "I've found someone who's JUST LIKE ME", who were now publishing her book after the Little, Brown Book Group had dropped Burchill. This came after Burchill had made defamatory statements about the journalist Ash Sarkar. However, Burchill parted with Stirling Publishing when she found out that Stirling was associated with Patriotic Alternative.

Patriotic Alternative's social media accounts on Facebook, Instagram and Twitter were suspended in February 2021, but some of its regional pages remained. PA's Twitter accounts were reopened in 2022 following Elon Musk's acquisition of the platform before being banned once again in February 2023.

In October 2021, Tim Wills, a councillor in Worthing, was suspended from the Conservative Party over allegations of secret support for Patriotic Alternative after Hope not Hate published results of an investigation into him. Wills resigned from the council on 15 October. The same month, in a district of Borehamwood, the Hertfordshire Constabulary increased patrols after leaflets calling for the banning of kosher and halal food were delivered to several Jewish homes. While it was not considered a hate crime, it was considered a hate incident and was condemned by local representatives of all three major political parties.

On 9 August 2022, Patriotic Alternative held its annual White Lives Matter activism day, coinciding with the United Nations designated International Day of the World's Indigenous Peoples.

A joint investigation by The Times and the anti-fascist investigative group Red Flare in September 2022 revealed the identity of a Patriotic Alternative supporter and "Britain's most racist YouTuber", known as "The Ayatollah", as James Owens, a 37-year-old journalism graduate from Hixon, a village in Staffordshire.

In addition to activism, Patriotic Alternative has helped other political parties to contest in local elections, offering support for the British Democratic Party during the 2023 local elections and candidates from the English Democrats in Dover and Deal, Leigh and Atherton, Newark, Bolton West and Makerfield in the 2024 United Kingdom general election. In May 2025, Collett urged PA members to infiltrate the Reform UK party, seeking to move it further to the right.

Patriotic Alternative supporters have been known to attend riots, first showing up in February 2023 at hotels in Knowsley and Glasgow. A prominent member of the group was reported to have taken part in the 2024 Southport riot, while another member helped to promote the event. In October The Independent reported that PA had raised almost £15,000 for the families of people sent to prison over their roles in that summer's anti-immigration riots. The following year, members or supporters of the group organised and took part in some of the 2025 British anti-immigration protests, including some at which demonstrators clashed with counter-protesters.

In March 2023, Patriotic Alternative delivered leaflets, using the term "white genocide", to homes in the Welsh town of Llantwit Major, warning about the possibility of migrants moving there, as part of its response to local plans to build a site for asylum seekers..

According to Searchlight magazine, in 2023 Alek Yerbury left Patriotic Alternative and formed a new militant group named the National Support Detachment. Within a month, PA national administration officer Kenny Smith had also left and formed a new organisation called Homeland, attracting many members of Patriotic Alternative to join. The organisation's inaugural meeting was held on Adolf Hitler's birthday.

On 14 March 2024, Michael Gove, the Secretary of State for Levelling Up, Housing and Communities, speaking in Parliament, named the organisation as one of several regarded as "a cause for concern" under a newly introduced official UK government definition of extremism.

There were calls for police investigation into the organisation following a BBC Wales investigation published in 2025, when group members were secretly recorded, with one saying he believed a race war was "inevitable", that PA should use a similar tactic to the Nazi party to gain power, and if immigrants did not leave: "The only way to get rid of them will be to kill every single one of them." During the investigation, Joe Marsh, the organisation's organiser in Wales, was filmed making the remark: "If you didn't have Jamaicans and Africans here stabbing people, we wouldn't have any knife crime." Marsh has authored two books detailing his involvement in football hooliganism, in which he boasts of stabbing two men during a drunken brawl, for which he received a two-year prison sentence for grievous bodily harm.

In August 2025, The Times reported that The Woodlander Initiative - a group that had been raising money to buy land on which to form whites-only enclaves - had "forged close ties" with Patriotic Alternative, and its founder had spoken at their annual conference. The Guardian reported that Mark Collett had praised TWI as a "fantastic initiative".

== Prosecutions ==
In June 2023, a Patriotic Alternative member, Kristofer Thomas Kearner, who had pleaded guilty to charges of disseminating terrorist publications on a Telegram account, including the manifestos of Brenton Tarrant and Anders Behring Breivik, was imprisoned for four years and eight months.

In March 2026, Alina Burns, a 19-year-old member of Patriotic Alternative, pleaded guilty to the attempted murder of Mohammed Mahmoodi on 2 August 2025, and was sentenced to 19 years and six months in prison on 15 May 2026. Burns is autistic and has suffered from anorexia.

In May 2026 four men were arrested and charged in connection with threatening and abusive behaviour at an anti-immigration protest in Blairgowrie, Perth and Kinross, during which neo-Nazi flags were placed on the Wellmeadow war memorial, including one linked to Patriotic Alternative which read "Deport all illegal migrants".

In September 2026, Thomas Webster, a 29-year-old former tax worker at HM Revenue and Customs, was given a two year sentence on ten counts of stirring up racial hatred, after calling for the killing and extinction of "racial enemies", including Muslims, Jews and gay people. He had described himself as a "genocidal racist monster". Webster had been referred to Prevent four times since 2017.

Later in September, Ivan Jennings, a 46-year-old warehouse worker from Stafford, was sentenced to five years after pleading guilty to encouraging terrorism. On social media, including online group chats, Jennings discussed killing Jews and Muslims and identified targets of a potential attack. His defence lawyer spoke of Jennings' "deep existential fears" after experiencing a heart attack at work in 2023.

== Links to National Action ==
The Times reported in October 2021 that Mark Collett had attended combat training with former members of the proscribed neo-Nazi terrorist organisation National Action. The investigation also revealed that Kristofer Kearney, known as Kris Kearns, who leads Patriotic Alternative's "Fitness Club" initiative, was active in National Action before the group was banned. Kearns had been living in Spain, but was extradited, convicted of terrorism, and jailed in 2023 for four years and eight months. Sam Melia, a regional organiser for PA and husband of Laura Tyrie, was previously affiliated with National Action. Alex Davies, the jailed co-founder of National Action, had been active within Patriotic Alternative for more than two years.

== Transnational affiliations ==
In March 2021, Mark Collett, as a representative of Patriotic Alternative, participated in an online conference bringing together Daniel Conversano's Les Braves, the Syrian Social Nationalist Party and the Nordic Resistance Movement (NRM), at the end of which Mark Collett and Simon Lindberg of the NRM called for the union of white nationalists. In September 2021, PA formalised this partnership with Les Braves by publishing an article by Les Braves on its website. Australian extremist Blair Cottrell participated in a conference organised by Patriotic Alternative in 2024.

The Russian emigre news outlet The Insider listed Patriotic Alternative among the organisations sending representatives to an international congress of far-right and neo-Nazi movements held in the Mariinsky Palace in St. Petersburg in September 2025.
