= Anna Firth =

British politician (born 1966)

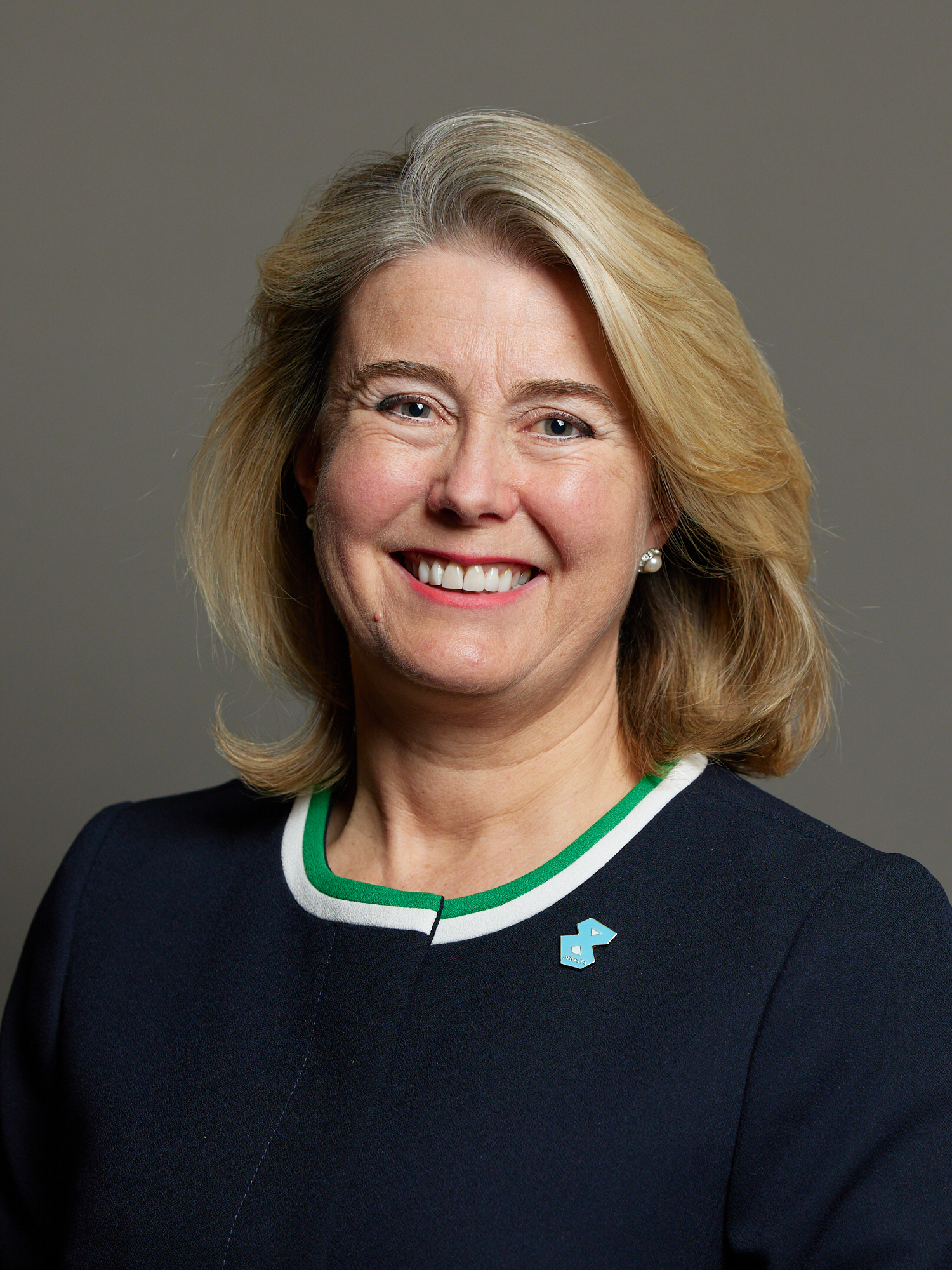
- Official portrait, 2022

Member of Parliament for Southend West
- In office 3 February 2022 – 30 May 2024
- Preceded by: David Amess
- Succeeded by: David Burton-Sampson

Personal details
- Born: Annalissa Garrett; 1966 (age 59–60) Leigh-on-Sea, Essex, England
- Party: Conservative
- Education: Durham University
- Occupation: former Politician and former barrister

Annalissa Firth (née Garrett, born 1966) is a British former politician and former barrister who served as the Member of Parliament (MP) for Southend West from 2022 to 2024. A member of the Conservative Party, she was also a councillor on Sevenoaks District Council between 2011 and 2022.

== Early life and career ==
Annalissa Garrett was born in 1966 and grew up in Leigh-on-Sea. Her education was at a private school. Her mother was a teacher and her father was an engineer. She has a brother called William. Garrett studied law at Durham University, graduating in 1988.

Garrett had a brief career as an investment banker before being called to the bar in 1991 at Inner Temple. She specialised in personal injury and professional negligence law.

Firth was elected as a councillor representing Brasted, Chevening & Sundridge ward on Sevenoaks District Council in Kent in 2011 and resigned the seat in 2022. She was elected as the National Voluntary Director of the grassroots think-tank Conservative Policy Forum in April 2020 and has also been a board member of the Conservative Environment Network. Firth co-founded the online summer school Invicta Academy in 2020 in response to the COVID-19 pandemic. She supports the expansion of grammar schools in the UK.

== Political career ==
At the 2015 general election, Firth stood unsuccessfully for Erith and Thamesmead, finishing second with 27.4% of the vote behind the incumbent Labour Party MP Teresa Pearce.

Firth also stood unsuccessfully at the 2019 general election for Canterbury, finishing second with 45.2% of the vote behind the incumbent Labour MP Rosie Duffield.

Firth was the sixth candidate placed on the Conservative party list in South East England for the 2019 European Parliament elections, but failed to be elected.

She was selected as the Conservative candidate for the 2022 Southend West by-election on 11 December 2021. The by-election was called following the murder of David Amess, the constituency's incumbent Conservative MP on 15 October 2021. All major opposition parties declined to run candidates in the by-election, all but assuring Firth's victory. At the election, Firth was elected to Parliament with 86.1% of the vote and a majority of 12,280.

Firth was a member of the Education Select Committee. In her maiden speech on 10 May 2022, she paid tribute to her predecessor as MP, Sir David Amess and his family.

Firth visited Archie Battersbee, a 12-year-old boy from Southend at the centre of a life-support withdrawal dispute, in June 2022 and contributed to a fundraiser for him. She criticised how the case was handled stating, "The state process for dealing with the withdrawal of life support for a child where there is a dispute between the parents and the hospital is just not appropriate", and asked for a meeting with the then Secretary of State for Health and Social Care Steve Barclay in August 2022.

She voiced her support for Priti Patel in the July–September 2022 Conservative Party leadership election on 10 July 2022. Two days later, Patel announced she would not be a candidate in the election. Firth later backed Liz Truss in August 2022. She was then appointed parliamentary private secretary (PPS) to the Department for International Trade in the Truss ministry. The following month, after the resignation of Truss and the succession of Rishi Sunak, Firth was appointed PPS to the Attorney General for England and Wales Victoria Prentis in the Sunak ministry.

At the 2024 general election, Firth stood for re-election in the renamed seat of Southend West and Leigh, with new boundaries, but the seat was won for Labour by David Burton-Sampson, with Firth in second place.

== Post-parliamentary career ==
Following her defeat at the 2024 general election, Firth has worked as a freelance public affairs advisor and political commentator.

== Personal life ==
She is married to Edward Firth who is a managing director of the investment banking firm Keefe, Bruyette & Woods. They have three children.

She is a patron of the Music Man Project, a Southend-based charity that provides musical opportunities to people with learning disabilities.

Parliament of the United Kingdom
Preceded by David Amess	Member of Parliament for Southend West; 2022–present	Constituency abolished
