= Hope Not Hate =

United Kingdom advocacy group

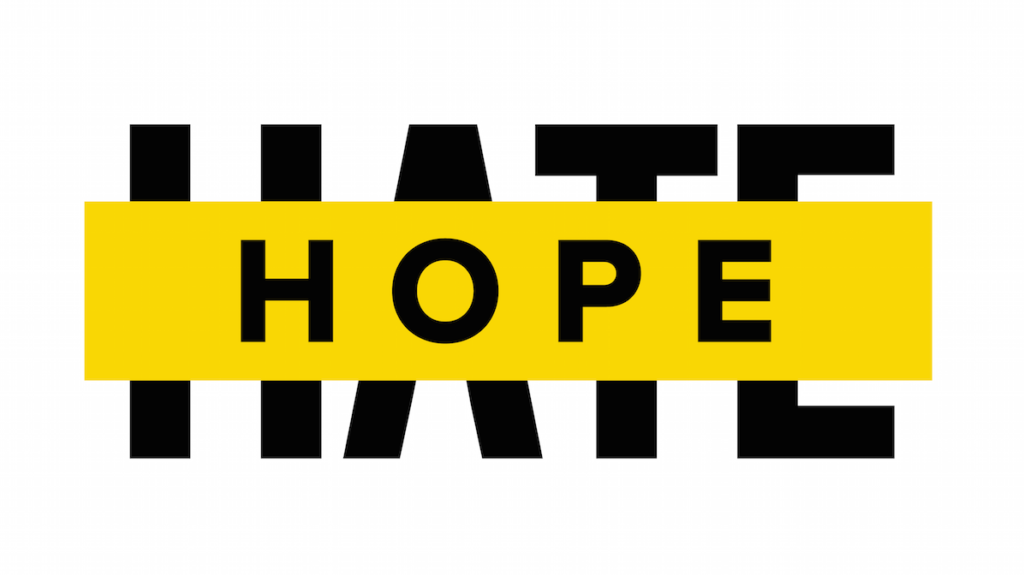

- Founded: 2004; 22 years ago
- Founder: Nick Lowles
- Type: Campaign group
- Purpose: Hate groups Racism
- Location: London, United Kingdom
- Region served: United Kingdom
- Product: Campaigning, lobbying, media, research
- Key people: Nick Lowles (Chief Executive)
- Website: hopenothate.org.uk

Hope Not Hate (stylised as HOPE not hate) is an advocacy group based in the United Kingdom which campaigns against racism and neo-fascism. It has mounted campaigns against Islamic extremism, antisemitism, and the far-right. The group was founded in 2004 by Nick Lowles, a former editor of the anti-fascist magazine Searchlight (from which it split in late 2011). In 2010 and 2012 it was backed by a few politicians and celebrities, and between 2009 and 2012 some trade unions backed the Hope Not Hate campaign against the British National Party.

== History and personnel ==
Hope Not Hate was founded in 2004 by Nick Lowles, former editor of the anti-fascist Searchlight magazine. Having experienced street racism as a child, Lowles became involved with the anti-fascist movement as a student volunteer at Sheffield University. Lowles had previously worked as a freelance investigative journalist, working for television programmes including BBC Panorama, World in Action, Channel Four Dispatches and MacIntyre Undercover. Between 1999 and 2011 Lowles was co-editor, and then editor, of Searchlight magazine. He was appointed MBE in 2016 for his services in tackling extremism.

Hope Not Hate functioned as part of Searchlight until 2011, when the organisations split. As a standalone organisation, Hope Not Hate took with it two of the three units of Searchlight: Searchlight Educational Trust (now HOPE Unlimited Charitable Trust); and Searchlight Information Services (now Hope Not Hate Ltd), its research, campaigning and investigative function. In 2016 it described itself as a "non-partisan, non-sectarian organisation".

Ruth Smeeth was a deputy director before 2015; after that, she was a member of its board.As of 2019, the Deputy Director was Jemma Levene, who previously worked as Head of Campaigns at Jewish cultural education charity SEED.

== Support ==
HNH is funded by charitable trusts, trade union funding, and individual donations.

During late 2012 and early 2013, the Searchlight Educational Trust (SET), which later renamed itself to Hope Not Hate Educational (HNH Ed: the charitable wing of Hope Not Hate), received three separate payments totaling £66,000 thanks to a funding agreement signed by the Department for Communities and Local Government. Conditions in the funding agreement prohibited the funds to be spent on anything other than "educational work", which also included a prohibition on political campaigning. The focus of the allocated funds was to establish community partnerships in four key areas which were prone to EDL activity, including sharing positive local stories and strengthening community bonds.

In 2010, writing in Labour List, Sam Tarry, then the national chair of Young Labour, and a campaign organiser for Labour Friends of Searchlight and Hope not hate, praised the group. In 2012, Sunder Katwala characterised HNH as "energetic" in a piece in Renewal. Also in 2012, the former prime minister, Gordon Brown, said, in a piece in about Malala Yousafzai on HNH's website, that he had "long admired" HNH. Writing in the blog on HNH's website in 2012, Nick Lowles, then the Hope Not Hate co-ordinator, said that comedian Eddie Izzard, writer and broadcaster Fiona Phillips and chef Simon Rimmer were patrons of HNH.

In 2009, Dave Prentis, the then general secretary of the Unison trade union, announced that Unison was leading the Hope Not Hate campaign against the British National Party. In 2011, the GMB union's website said that it was also part of the HNH campaign to defeat the British National Party. In 2012, the then president of the Unison trade union, Chris Tansley, announced on the union's website that he was "proud to support Hope Not Hate" as his "presidential charity". In 2012, the Unite the Union union's website said that they had links to HNH. In 2016 HNH canvassed trade unions, inviting them to affiliate to Trade Union Friends of HOPE not Hate.

== Activities ==
=== Far right and Islamophobia ===
The organisation encourages voters to support alternatives to far-right extremist movements; it also publishes allegations of violent activities by anti-Muslim organisations such as the English Defence League. It presented a 90,000-person petition to the European Parliament protesting against the election of Nick Griffin as an MEP.

Following the murder of Jo Cox, Hope Not Hate launched a nationwide #MoreInCommon campaign, with the blessing of the MP's family, hosting meetings across the UK which focused on healing divisions which were caused by the EU Referendum, culminating in 85+ events on the weekend of 3/4 September 2016. In December 2016 The Guardian newspaper joined a Hope Not Hate training workshop, revealing the work which was undertaken by its community workers on the doorsteps in south Wales.

In 2012, the organisation was increasingly focused on community-based campaigning, with a particular focus on building what it calls "community resilience" and focusing more on women voters. It has launched initiatives in support of British foods, Hate Crime Awareness Week, and reported extensively on the activities of the anti-Muslim counterjihad movement of Robert Spencer, Pamela Geller, and bloggers such as "Fjordman". It linked hundreds of EDL and National Front supporters in this network with support for the Norwegian killer Anders Behring Breivik.

In 2012, the group published original research which looked at the attitudes of voters towards far-right political parties in the UK, which concluded that nearly half of those who were polled by a Populus Ltd survey supported the creation of an English nationalist, anti-Muslim political party. Nick Lowles claimed in 2012 that politicians, including the Labour Party, need to address the way they talk about immigration and move away from encouraging "hate speech". Liz Fekete, of the Institute of Race Relations, has said that Lowles has not taken a hard enough line in rejecting narratives that portray Muslim men as disproportionately responsible for child sexual grooming.

The organisation updated its research in February 2016, noting that: "Respondents to the new Fear and HOPE 2016 survey were much more positive about personal and national progress, more economically secure, and less anxious about identity change." A further poll, one week after the Brexit vote, revealed that nearly two-thirds (63%) of those polled believed Britain was "more divided as a result of the Referendum vote and more people think there are more tensions between communities than when asked the same question in February".

Following a 26,000 signature petition which Hope Not Hate handed to the UK Home Secretary, on 26 June 2013, the US-based anti-Muslim bloggers Robert Spencer and Pamela Geller were banned from entering the UK. Geller and Spencer had been due to speak at an English Defence League march in Woolwich, south London, where Drummer Lee Rigby was murdered. Home Secretary Theresa May informed Spencer and Geller that their presence in the UK would "not be conducive to the public good". The decision, which they cannot appeal, may be reviewed in between three and five years. Similarly, Hope Not Hate condemned an EDL solidarity demonstration outside the Israeli embassy to which they had invited an American rabbi, with Lowles writing "While many in the Jewish community have understandable concerns about the rise of Islamic fundamentalism, it is important to remember that the EDL are not our friends".

In 2013, Hope Not Hate was one of the founding organisations of an anti-child sexual exploitation initiative called CAASE (Community Alliance Against Sexual Exploitation), featuring many Muslim and Christian organisations, victim support groups, survivors organisations, and local community networks. The network was founded in response to multiple "grooming" cases which were reported by the British press.

In October 2021, the organisation revealed that a Conservative Party borough councillor and activist Tim Wills in Worthing was also a supporter of the far-right and racist organisation Patriotic Alternative. The party announced that "Cllr Tim Wills has been suspended pending the outcome of an investigation".

In 2023 Hope Not Hate uncovered allegedly inflammatory historic social media posts made by the Conservative London mayoral candidate, Susan Hall.

=== Undercover: Exposing the Far Right ===
In October 2024, the documentary "Undercover: Exposing the Far Right" was aired on Channel 4. The documentary features undercover footage obtained from Hope Not Hate journalist Harry Shukman and researcher Patrik Hermansson of well-funded far-right activists from the Human Diversity Foundation (HDF). The foundation uses research papers, podcasts and websites to promote "race science". Undercover footage unmasked far-right activist and former private school teacher Matthew Frost, a leader of HDF and his connections to Andrew Conru who had funded the foundation with more than $1million.

=== Islamic extremism ===
In November 2013, the organisation unveiled research into the al-Muhajiroun Islamic extremist network. In a 60-page report, Gateway to Terror, it wrote that with its partner networks al-Muhajiroun had sent up to 300 fighters to Syria. It linked a further seventy individuals to terrorism offences or suicide bombings, and gave details of links to the Westgate shopping mall attack in Kenya, connections to al-Shabaab and a plot by French security services to kill Abu Hamza in the late 1990s.

On 16 October 2014, the organisation launched a new blog, Generation Jihad, which it said would "be a forum to monitor, expose and understand militant jihadism and extreme Islamism".

Once Anjem Choudary was found guilty of inviting support for the Islamic State in August 2016, Hope Not Hate updated its research and revealed that Choudary and his extremist groups had motivated at least a hundred people from Britain to pursue terrorism. More recently, it has also focused on Islamist extremists and issues of communal division, such as grooming.

=== UK Independence Party ===
In 2013, the organisation initiated a nationwide consultation among its supporters about the UK Independence Party (UKIP). The move attracted considerable criticism from some on the right. It went on to campaign vociferously against UKIP during the run-up to the 2014 European elections.

On 20 March 2019, Catherine Blaiklock, founder of the Brexit Party, resigned from the party after The Guardian enquired about deleted anti-Muslim messages from her Twitter account from before she took on the role. Blaiklock's deleted tweets were recovered by Hope Not Hate and passed to The Guardian.

In November 2019, Hope Not Hate said "An election has just been called for the 12th December 2019 and our priority is clear – we're going to be taking on Nigel Farage and his Brexit party, to make sure they don't win any seats." A polling agency carried out research for Hope Not Hate and Best for Britain, that was used to produce a tool for pro-EU tactical voting.

=== Antisemitism ===
Hope Not Hate has commented regularly on antisemitism allegations in the Labour Party. In June 2019, the group condemned Lisa Forbes after she was found to have 'liked' a post on Facebook saying that Theresa May had a "Zionist Slave Master's agenda". In July 2019, Lowles said that there had been "an appalling lack of understanding of the hurt and fear felt by Jewish party members and the Jewish community". He also said that "the leadership should start listening to people like the Jewish Labour Movement and bringing forward substantial organisational and cultural change." In November 2019, Lowles was reported to have written to every member of Labour's National Executive Committee, urging them to bar suspended MP Chris Williamson from defending his seat at the following month's general election and to expel him from the party.

=== Anti-trans ===
Hope Not Hate has provided analysis of anti-trans hate movements, and has described Kellie-Jay Keen-Minshull as "a leading voice in the antitrans movement" who has "increasingly found support from and an overlap in views with the far right."

== Public and political response ==
In February 2016, founder Nick Lowles said that he had been removed from the invitation list of a National Union of Students event due to opposition by the NUS Black Students campaign, which claimed that Lowles was Islamophobic. The president of the NUS said “Representatives from Hope Not Hate, including Nick Lowles, have and continue to be invited to NUS events. I have tried to clarify this issue with Mr Lowles but have been unable to contact him.”

In November 2016, a Hope Not Hate draft press release about a report on the extent of abusive social media following the murder of Jo Cox MP by a right-wing extremist included incorrect figures not in the report. According to an investigation by The Economist, "The report itself gave a confusing impression of the number of tweets that celebrated Ms Cox’s murder": "Hope Not Hate’s mistake is to take xenophobic Brexit-related tweets (which are plentiful, though a tiny fraction of the whole) and add them to tweets celebrating the murder of an MP (which as far as we can establish were very rare) to make a single tally of hatred. It then compounds the error by focusing on Ms Cox in the report’s headline and the initial press release." A corrected version of the release was subsequently sent to all other media for the report's official launch, and the original article was withdrawn.

In December 2016, the British politician Nigel Farage accused the group of being "extremists" who "masquerade as being lovely and peaceful but actually pursue violent and very undemocratic means", after Jo Cox's widower husband Brendan Cox had chosen Hope Not Hate as one of three beneficiaries of her memorial fund. The group responded by setting up a crowdfunded appeal for a legal fund to sue Farage over the remarks. Hope Not Hate proceeded to issue a claim against Farage for libel. In November 2017, shortly before the libel case came to court, it was settled as Farage agreed to withdraw his comments.

During the 2024 United Kingdom riots, Nick Lowles tweeted that reports were coming that acid was being thrown at a Muslim woman in the streets of Middlesbrough. Lowles later apologised after Cleveland Police confirmed no such incident had been recorded. Conservative MP Neil O'Brien called Lowles' behaviour "incredibly irresponsible".

In 2024-25 the relationship between Hope not Hate Charitable Trust and Hope not Hate Ltd, a separate legal entity, was the subject of Charity Commission review. The commission advised that action be taken to make the distinction between the two entities more clear. Jack Rankin MP and Nigel Farage MP have written to the Charity Commission accusing Hope not Hate of using its charity-company structure as a vehicle to allegedly misappropriate charitable and state funds to support political campaigning. Another case was opened by the commission and restructuring efforts were undertaken. The commission concluded it was "satisfied the charity has sufficiently responded to directions for there to be greater transparency for the public about its activities".

== Publications ==
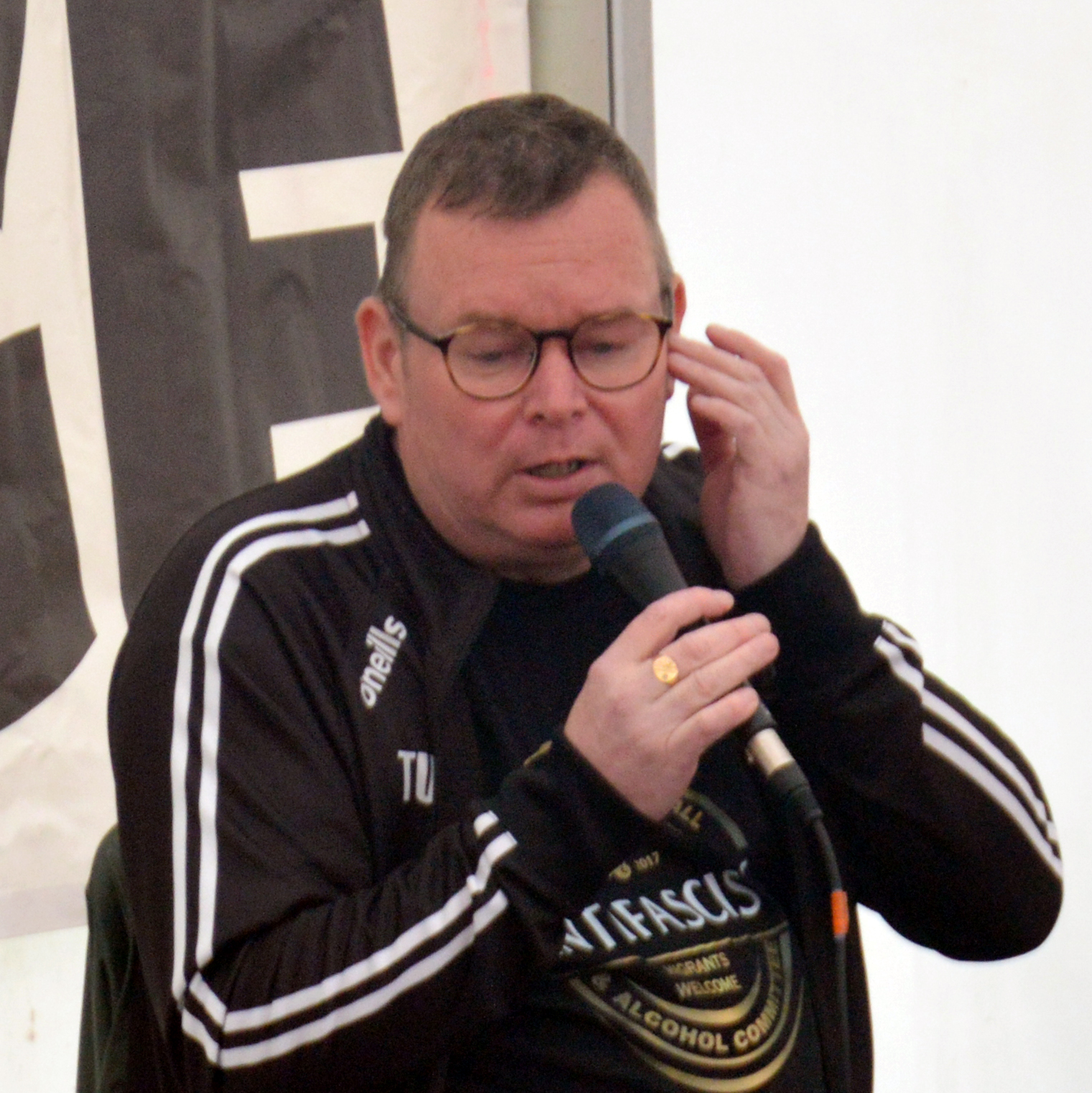
Author and activist Matthew F. Collins

The campaign publishes an eponymous bi-monthly magazine; in 2011 it commissioned an opinion poll on electoral attitudes towards English identity, faith and race, published as the Fear and Hope survey. In 2012 it issued a report on the counterjihad movement, the Counter-Jihad Report; and in the same year produced a 75th anniversary guide to the Battle of Cable Street. In 2011 Matthew Collins, a former National Front and British National Party member and part of the group's investigative team, published Hate: My Life in the British Far Right (ISBN 978-1-84954-327-9). In June 2014 Collins and Hope Not Hate published original research into what they termed a far-right, Christian fundamentalist organisation, Britain First, revealing its links to Loyalist paramilitaries in Northern Ireland and preparation for conflict, after the group held controversial "Christian Patrols" and "mosque invasions" in various cities in the UK. In response, Britain First issued a press release threatening "direct action" against any journalist repeating "any inaccuracies or lies peddled by Hope Not Hate".

== Notable supporters ==
Prominent supporters of Hope Not Hate have included businessman Alan Sugar, boxer Amir Khan, singer Beverley Knight, actress and screenwriter Meera Syal, TV presenter Fiona Phillips, former MP (2015–19) Ruth Smeeth, chef Simon Rimmer, songwriter Billy Bragg, entrepreneur Levi Roots, singer Speech Debelle, actress and singer Paloma Faith, presenter Dermot O'Leary, Baroness Glenys Kinnock, comedian Eddie Izzard, murdered MP Jo Cox, and Swedish Tetra Pak heiress Sigrid Rausing.

== See also ==
- Red Flare
- Searchlight (magazine)
- The Walk-In, 2022 TV series about Hope Not Hate's role in foiling a plot to murder a British MP
