= Prescod =

Prescod is a surname. Notable people with the surname include:

- Colin Prescod (born 1944), British sociologist and cultural activist
- Gail Prescod (born 1971), Vincentian sprinter
- Margaret Prescod, activist, author, journalist and radio host
- Nzingha Prescod (born 1992), American foil fencer
- Pearl Prescod (1920–1966), Tobagonian actress and singer
- Reece Prescod (born 1996), British sprinter
- Samuel Jackman Prescod (1806–1871), first person of African descent elected to the Parliament of Barbados
- Trevor Prescod, Barbadian politician
