= 1995 Fife Council election =

1995 Scottish local government election

- 6 May 1995

All 88 seats to Fife Council 45 seats needed for a majority
	First party	Second party	Third party
Party	Labour	Liberal Democrats	SNP
Seats won	52	24	9
Popular vote	53,759	23,208	24,550
Percentage	46.5%	20.1%	21.2%
	Fourth party	Fifth party
Party	Independent	Communist (Scotland)
Seats won	2	1
Popular vote	3,590	1,271
Percentage	3.1%	1.1%
- Results by ward.
Council Leader before election
John MacDougall
Labour
Council Leader after election
John MacDougall
Labour

1995 Elections to Fife Council were held on the 6 April 1995 and were the first for the newly formed unitary authority for Fife Council, which was created under the Local Government etc (Scotland) Act 1994.

== Election results ==
Fife local election result 1995
Party	Seats	Gains	Losses	Net gain/loss	Seats %	Votes %	Votes	+/−
Labour	52				57.8	46.5	53,759	
Liberal Democrats	24				26.7	20.1	23,208	
SNP	9				10.0	21.2	24,550	
Conservative	0	0			0.0	5.8	6,744	
Independent	2				2.2	3.1	3,590	
Communist (Scotland)	1				1.1	1.1	1,271	
Democratic Left	0	0			0.0	0.8	976	
Independent Labour	0	0			0.0	0.7	846	
Independent Scottish Nationalist	0	0			0.0	0.5	573	
Christian Democrat	0	0			0.0	0.0	29	

Turnout was 42.2%

== Party performance ==
Labour performed very well continuing control of its majority.
