= Fernando Henriques =

Jamaican educator and scholar (1916–1976)

- Born: 15 June 1916; Kingston, Jamaica
- Died: 25 May 1976 (aged 59); London, England
- Occupation: Professor of Social Anthropology
- Spouse: Rosamund Seymour
- Children: Julian Henriques, Adrian Henriques, Tarquin Henriques, and Judith Levin.
- Awards: Directorship of The Centre for Multi-Racial Studies, University of Sussex and University of the West Indies

Academic background
- Education: University of Oxford
- Doctoral advisor: Meyer Fortes

Academic work
- Discipline: Social Anthropology
- Sub-discipline: Sociology, Ethnic and Racial Studies, Caribbean Studies
- Institutions: University of Leeds; University of Sussex; University of the West Indies

Louis "Fernando" Henriques (15 June 1916 – 25 May 1976) was a Jamaican educator and scholar. As a social anthropologist, he made significant contributions to British and Caribbean social sciences scholarship on colour, class, sexuality, and race relations. From a prominent Jamaican family, his mixed cultural heritage and experiences in both British and Caribbean cultures informed his research and academic practice. One of the first Black British professors in UK academic history, Fernando Henriques developed his scholarly expertise though positions at the Universities of Oxford, Leeds, Sussex and the West Indies, bridging the latter two institutions through his role as Director of The Centre for Multi-Racial Studies between 1964 and 1974.

== Biography ==
=== Early life and family ===
Fernando Henriques was born on 15 June 1916 in Kingston, Jamaica, to Cyril Charles Henriques, a wealthy merchant, and Edith Emily Delfosse. His father was of Portuguese and Jewish descent, while his mother was born in Haiti. One of six children, he moved with his whole family to England from Jamaica in 1919 at the age of three, as his father wanted to give his children an English education. Fernando was the youngest of six siblings, including Pauline Crabbe OBE (1914–1998), an actor, broadcaster and magistrate; and their elder brother Sir Cyril George Henriques (1908–1982), a Lord Chief Justice of Jamaica knighted in 1963. The Henriques siblings are mentioned in an exhibition about Jamaican families and their roles in the UK during the Second World War in Southwark.

Fernando married Rosamund (née Seymour), an artist who went on to illustrate his books, and together they had three sons, Julian, Adrian, and Tarquin.

Fernando also had a daughter, Judith Levin.

=== Education ===
Fernando Henriques attended St Aloysius' College, Highgate, in North London. In 1939, he was awarded a London County Council scholarship to the London School of Economics to read Law, but his studies were interrupted by the outbreak of the Second World War. Between 1939–1942 Fernando served in the Auxiliary Fire Service in London. Fernando decided to change his academic pathway from Law to History and 1942 he won a scholarship to attend Brasenose College Oxford as a Senior History Scholar, where he was elected president of the Oxford Union in Trinity term 1944. He went on to complete a D.Phil. in Social Anthropology at Oxford (1948), including fieldwork in the Caribbean as a Carnegie Research Fellow, supervised by Meyer Fortes and Alfred Radcliffe-Brown. During his doctoral studies, Henriques taught as a part-time lecturer in the Oxford Delegacy for Extra-Mural Studies, and as a Graduate Assistant in the Institute of Social Anthropology.

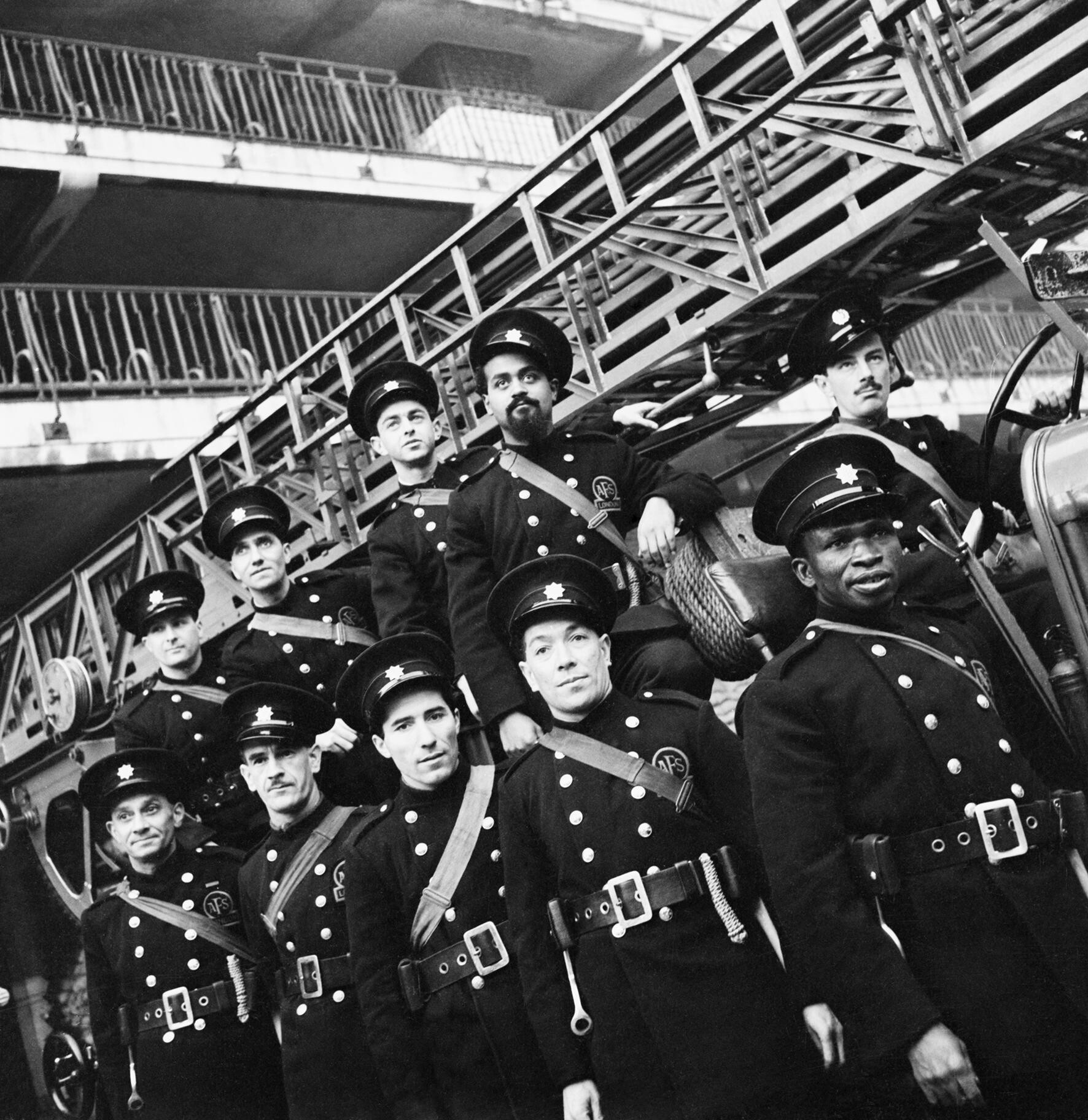
Group photograph of men serving with the Auxiliary Fire Service in London, 1941. Henriques is in the back row, second from right.

=== Teaching and professional experience ===
==== University of Leeds ====
In 1948, Henriques' first position was as a Lecturer in Social Anthropology at the University of Leeds, where he went on to become Dean of the Faculty of Economic and Social Studies, “possibly the first Black academic to hold such a role anywhere in the UK”. It was there that he co-wrote the classic ethnographic study Coal is Our Life: An Analysis of a Yorkshire Mining Community (1956), with Norman Dennis and Clifford Slaughter, which examined the everyday life of a close-knit community, exploring the relationships between the working, family and leisure environments. Henriques was targeted by the Yorkshire press amidst local outrage at some of the study's findings, which analysed the practices and moral dimensions of extra-marital sexual activity within mining communities. In 1964, Henriques joined the University of Sussex as Professor of Social Anthropology.

==== University of Sussex and University of the West Indies ====
Henriques was appointed as Professorial Fellow in Sociology, School of African and Asian Studies, University of Sussex, in Autumn 1964. His main task in this role was to set up and direct the Centre for Multi-Racial Studies, a unit based in the School of Social Studies, with its main site developed in Barbados via a partnership with the University of the West Indies at Cave Hill. The project was strongly supported by Asa Briggs, a friend of Henriques who had been connected by him to Gilberto Freyre. Funded principally through a grant from Bata Corporation, with support from the UK Foreign Office, the Centre for Multi-Racial Studies had three main tasks:

- the assembly of materials and information relating to race relations with particular reference to the Caribbean region, Latin America and Africa;
- research projects relating to this field in which graduate students would be involved;
- the arrangement of seminars of varying duration for people outside the University and particularly from the areas concerned. The members of these seminars would be drawn from the universities, the public services, business and labour.

The Centre operated under Henriques' directorship until 1974, when its funding model became unsustainable.

==== Other appointments ====
Henriques was a member of council of the Institute of Race Relations from 1965 until his death, and he was also a member of the South-East Economic Planning Council between 1966 and 1968. In 1975, he was appointed to the role of Director of the Department of Social Sciences at UNESCO. He was unable to establish himself into this post due to terminal ill health.

=== Death ===
Henriques was admitted to St Thomas's Hospital in spring 1976 and died of bowel cancer on 25 May 1976. His obituary in The Times stated that he had "relied on his intuition more than on his scholarship, and if he never wrote the books his friend wished him to write he could be a delightful and stimulating companion. He was willing to tackle any subject and to express himself with eloquence and vigour."

== Professional contributions ==
=== Research and development ===
Fernando Henriques made significant contributions to three fields of social anthropological enquiry. The first field concerned the complexities of class and colour in the Caribbean based on his research in his native Jamaica and published as Family and Colour in Jamaica (1953). In this book, Henriques "overturned the myth of the objective outside observer, showing that ethnography is based on the subjective interpretation of fieldwork and that the interpreter must therefore reveal his or her biases", as well as highlighting "the importance of history, showing that the exploitative history of European colonialism, plantations and slavery was crucial for understanding Jamaica, with its multi-racial society, cultural variations and social inequalities embedded in a colour-class system”. Discussing colour casteism in Outliers: the Story of Success (2008), Malcolm Gladwell quotes an extended passage from Family and Colour in Jamaica.

The second contribution Henriques made was to the understanding of the social and cultural aspects of human sexual behaviour, particularly prostitution from antiquity to the present, published as Love in Action (1959) and the three-volume survey Prostitution and Society (1962–68). These works have been a reference point for contemporary research, as for example Kamala Kempadoo acknowledges in her collection Sun, Sex, and Gold. The trajectory of Henriques' significant works on this theme began with his influential Coal is Our Life ethnographic study of Yorkshire mining communities, which included analysis of generational discourses on the morality of extra-marital sexual behaviour.

The third field to which Henriques contributed was that of race relations with his directorship of the Centre for Multi Racial Studies, which was established at the University of Sussex in 1964, with its main centre opening in Barbados in 1968. The research unit was a partnership between the University of Sussex and the University of the West Indies, Cave Hill, Barbados. Its main purposes were to develop a library and research centre collecting relevant material with particular reference to the Caribbean, Latin America, Africa and South East Asia; the carrying out of research projects involving post-graduate students; the delivery of seminars and conferences for academics and others; and the provision of courses in race relations for firms operating overseas. Distinguished speakers at the two-day opening ceremony of the Barbados centre in 1968 included The Prime Minister of Barbados, Errol Barrow; Vice Chancellor of the University of the West Indies, Sir Philip Sherlock; Pro-Chancellor of the University of the West Indies and Prime Minister of Trinidad and Tobago, Eric Williams; Lord Caradon, Permanent U.K. Representative at the United Nations; the Governor-General of Barbados, Sir Winston Scott; and Professor of Anthropology at the University of Cambridge, Meyer Fortes. In his speech at this event, Fortes argued for the urgent need to apply a new generation of research and practice to the "spectre of race" haunting not only Europe but "the whole world". At the same event, Professor Asa Briggs commended Henriques for "the imaginative boldness with which he first conceived the idea which lies behind this Centre and for his enthusiasm in developing it".

Henriques' decade-long tenure directing the Centre for Multi-Racial Studies culminated in the publication of his final monograph Children of Caliban: Misegenation (1974), a historical survey of sexual relationships and reproduction between mixed ethnic groups in the West Indies, Africa, Europe and the United States. This book has influenced the work of contemporary scholars of race and cultural studies, including Mica Nava who argues that Henriques' Children of Caliban offers a nuanced and vivid account of national differences in gendered prejudicial attitudes towards mixed race relationships. In a manner that was uncharacteristic of social anthropological studies of the time, Henriques declared in the first chapter of this book that it is framed through a particular personal bias, namely, "that of a black man who grew up in a white world, and whose major orientation lies with Europe, but who nevertheless can never escape the heritage of his colour." In her review of the book, Hazel Waters from the Institute of Race Relations argued that its "greatest value, for white people especially, is in its detailed exposure of one facet of the hypocrisy, cruelty and double think that have been the genesis of so much white values, beliefs and attitudes".

== Awards and honours ==
Henriques was elected to the Atheaneum Club in 1967.

== Selected published works ==
=== Books ===
- Family and Colour in Jamaica (1953), London: Eyre & Spottiswoode OCLC 328358
- Coal is Our Life: An Analysis of a Yorkshire Mining Community, with Norman Dennis and Clifford Slaughter (1956), London: Eyre & Spottiswoode. OCLC 56293
- Jamaica: Land of Wood and Water (1957), London: MacGibbon & Kee OCLC 1673439
- Love in Action: the Sociology of Sex (1959), London: MacGibbon & Kee OCLC 1052840789
- Prostitution and Society: a Survey, volume 1 – Primitive, Classical and Oriental (1962), London: MacGibbon & Kee OCLC 928852329
- Prostitution and Society: a Survey, volume 2 – Europe and the New World (1963), London: MacGibbon & Kee
- Prostitution and Society: a Survey, volume 3 – Modern Sexuality (1968), London: MacGibbon & Kee OCLC 655749239
- Children of Caliban: Miscegenation (1974), London: Secker & Warburg OCLC 1340043
- Race and Class in Post-Colonial Society: A Study of Ethnic Group Relations in the English-Speaking Caribbean, Bolivia, Chile and Mexico (1977), Paris: UNESCO. OCLC 3831524

=== Articles ===
- "West Indian Family Organisation", Caribbean Quarterly 2, no. 1 (1951): 16–24. https://doi.org/10.1080/00086495.1951.11829349
- "Colour Values in Jamaican Society", The British Journal of Sociology 2, no. 2 (1951): 115–21. https://doi.org/10.2307/587383
- "Kinship and Death in Jamaica", Phylon (1940) 12, no. 3 (1951): 272–78. https://doi.org/10.2307/271643
- "The West Indies", The Journal of Commonwealth Literature 2, no. 2 (June 1, 1967): 91–95. https://doi.org/10.1177/002198946900400116
- "Immigrants and Associations and Race and Racism: A Comparative Perspective", International Affairs (London) 44, no. 3 (1968): 537–38. https://doi.org/10.2307/2615061
- "Domination through Racialism", Patterns of Prejudice 8, no. 5 (1974): 6–12. https://doi.org/10.1080/0031322X.1974.9969204
- "The Race Concept and Race Differences in Intelligence", International Affairs (London) 52, no. 2 (1976): 266. https://doi.org/10.2307/2616018
