= 43rd Congress of the Communist Party of Great Britain =

Final congress of the Communist Party of Great Britain

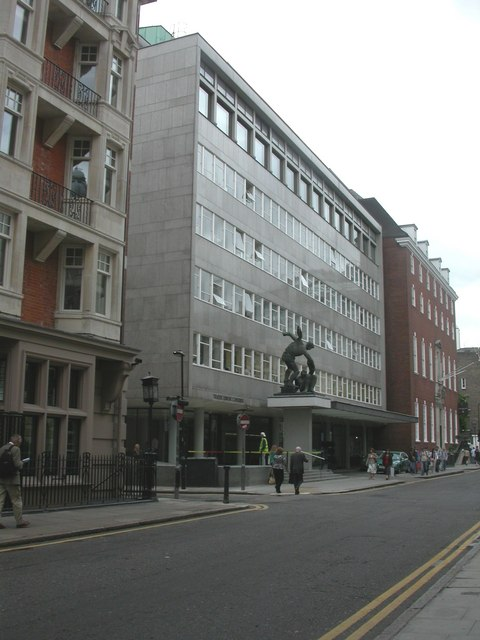
- Congress House, where the congress was held
- Date: November 22–24, 1991
- Venue: Congress House, Great Russell Street
- Location: Holborn, London, England
- Also known as: The Final CPGB Congress
- Type: Political party congress
- Theme: Dissolution of the Communist Party of Great Britain
- Organised by: Communist Party of Great Britain
- Participants: 213 CPGB delegates
- Outcome: Dissolution of the Communist Party of Great Britain (135–72 vote); formation of Democratic Left

The 43rd Congress of the Communist Party of Great Britain was held from 22–24 November 1991 at Congress House in Great Russell Street, London. The congress marked the final gathering of the Communist Party of Great Britain, effectively ending the organisation after 71 years of existence. Held amid the party's severe decline - membership had collapsed to approximately 5,000 from a wartime peak of 56,000 - the congress reflected internal turmoil over the party's direction following the collapse of communist regimes across Eastern Europe and the Soviet Union. Chaired by Marian Darke and attended by 213 delegates, the congress concluded with a decisive vote: 135 delegates supported dissolving the CPGB and establishing the successor organisation Democratic Left, while 72 opposed the motion.

== Background ==
By 1991, the CPGB had experienced significant decline, with membership falling to approximately 6,000 by 1990. The final congress recorded an overall figure of 4,742 members. The collapse of communist regimes across Eastern Europe in 1989–1990 and the failed August 1991 coup attempt in the Soviet Union had created internal debates within the party about its fundamental purposes and identity. As one activist later recalled, by this time the party's members' journal showed "an organisation almost entirely preoccupied with discussing its own internal politics, with little outward-facing campaigning".

Throughout 1990 and 1991, extensive debates had taken place within the party about whether it should continue to exist as a traditional communist party or transform itself into a new type of organisation. The party leadership, led by General Secretary Nina Temple, favoured transformation into what became known as "Democratic Left", while traditionalist members and the "Straight Left" faction sought to preserve the party's communist identity and structures.

The March 1991 Executive Committee proposals for a "transformed party" effectively called for dissolution of the CPGB, recommending that the term "party" be removed from the new organisation's title, with "Democratic Left" as the preferred alternative. Additionally, revelations about secret Soviet funding emerged just days before the congress when The Sunday Times obtained records showing that Reuben Falber, the party's former assistant general secretary, had collected over £100,000 in some years between 1957 and 1979 from Soviet embassy contacts. The party had previously denied receiving such funding, and the timing of the disclosures coincided with arguments for complete transformation.

== The Congress ==
The congress convened with 213 delegates in attendance, though other sources suggest approximately 220. Outside the venue, a Morning Star seller managed to sell only eighteen copies despite the large number of delegates entering. The proceedings were chaired by Marian Darke, the Party's 42-year-old vice-president and secondary school teacher who was due to become president of the National Union of Teachers. She was described as one of the Party's chief strategists responsible for developing the "Democratic Left" concept.

The congress began with procedural disputes, with the first speaker alleging that the executive had predetermined the outcome. Early debates were marked by the generational divide within the party, with younger delegates advocating transformation while older members expressed reservations about abandoning the party's communist identity. Despite predictions of a close contest, the voting proved decisively in favour of transformation, with regular two-to-one majorities supporting the dismantling of existing party structures and their replacement with a loosely articulated federal organisation.

Traditionalist delegates mounted substantial opposition to preserve the party's structures. Around thirty were prepared to applaud the principle of receiving secret financial support from the Communist Party of the Soviet Union, highlighting the deep ideological divisions within the party.

Among the notable speakers was Wilf Page, an 80-year-old Communist farmworker from Norfolk who had suffered years of blacklisting for his beliefs. Despite his traditionalist background, Page supported the transformation, stating that "older comrades must shed our nostalgia, including the name of the organisation" and offering support to younger members seeking change. Other speakers included historian Monty Johnstone, who secured the only traditionalist victory during the congress, and Mike Squires, a London taxi driver with a PhD who unsuccessfully attempted to ensure the new organisation retained a commitment to public ownership.

When Darke asked delegates to vote on changing the name to Democratic Left by holding up their orange credential cards, the motion passed decisively. Those supporting transformation won all the important votes and secured every place on the new Federal Executive. The congress formally voted by 135 votes to 72 to dissolve the CPGB and establish the successor organisation "Democratic Left". The display of the new "Democratic Left" name and logo over the platform was delayed until lunchtime when the volunteer responsible overslept. Notably, the congress was not particularly youthful, with the largest single age group being the over-forties.

== Aftermath ==
Some traditionalists who opposed the dissolution vowed to continue the communist name and traditions, attempting to establish a separate party or to link up with existing groups such as the Communist Party of Britain and the New Communist Party of Britain.

Democratic Left, the successor organisation, inherited both the legitimacy of descent from the CPGB and substantial physical resources, including significant property assets. However, it struggled to establish a meaningful role in British politics without the labour movement base and influential Marxism Today journal that had sustained the CPGB in its later years. Despite the decisive vote for transformation, "no more than one third of the remaining CPGB members felt inspired to join it".

== See also ==
- Communist Party of Great Britain
- Democratic Left (United Kingdom)
- New Times (politics)

== Bibliography ==
- Andrews, Geoff (2004). Endgames and New Times: The Final Years of British Communism 1964-1991. London: Lawrence & Wishart. ISBN 978-0-85315-991-9.
- Beckett, Francis (1995). The Enemy Within: The Rise and Fall of the British Communist Party. London: John Murray Publishers. ISBN 978-0-7195-5310-3.
- King, Francis (2021). "The decline and fall of the Communist Party of Great Britain: An activist's memoir, 1977-1991". Socialist History. 60: 44–67.
- Robinson, Emily (2011). "New times, new politics: History and memory during the final years of the CPGB". British Politics. 6 (4): 453–478. doi:10.1057/bp.2011.24.
- Thompson, Willie (1992). The Good Old Cause: British Communism 1920-1991. London: Pluto Press. ISBN 978-0-7453-0579-0.
