= Campaign Against Racism and Fascism =

Campaign Against Racism and Fascism (CARF) was an anti-racist group and publication based in London which originated in the mid-1970s as an anti-racist/anti-fascist paper published by the federation of Anti-Fascist Committees in Greater London (Anti-Racist, Anti-Fascist Co-ordinating Committee). From 1979 it appeared as a section within the anti-Fascist Searchlight magazine, produced by the CARF Collective based at the Institute of Race Relations, and later still it split with Searchlight to publish as an independent magazine for some years before closing down in 2003. The CARF group then operated as a support group for the IRR's news output.

== History ==
The journal CARF was first published in 1976 by the Richmond & Twickenham Anti Racist Committee. In 1977 it was adopted as the paper of the (London) Anti-Racist, Anti-Fascist Co-ordinating Committee (ARAFCC) - a federation of the broad-based anti-fascist committees that had sprung up across Greater London in response to the growth of the National Front and its Strasserite offshoot, the National Party. ARAFCC and CARF were also associated with the Institute of Race Relations (IRR). Liz Fekete was part of both CARF and IRR.

When ARAFCC wound down in 1979 CARF continued to publish under an agreement with the then editor of Searchlight, Maurice Ludmer, with whom they had generally good relations, and CARF appeared for several years as a separately edited section within Searchlight. This arrangement continued after the untimely death of Ludmer in 1981, but was put under some strain by the perception that Searchlight maintained too close a relationship with pro-Zionist groups (Zionism being regarded as a racist ideology by some leftist and anti-racist groups and organisations in the UK).

This strain came to a head in the 1990s when Searchlight editor Gerry Gable was accused of racism for promoting openly pro-Israeli/pro-Zionist groups. The CARF editorial group decided to end their relationship with Searchlight. CARF was re-launched as an independent publication and survived for over a decade until it was dissolved in 2003. The CARF Editorial Collective continued to meet and to operate for some time as a support network for the IRR.
