= Nina Temple =

British politician (born 1956)

Secretary of the Communist Party of Great Britain
- In office January 1990 – November 1991
- Preceded by: Gordon McLennan
- Succeeded by: Post abolished

General Secretary of the Young Communist League
- In office 1979–1983
- Preceded by: Tom Bell
- Succeeded by: Douglas Chalmers

Personal details
- Born: Nina Claire Temple; 21 April 1956 (age 70) Westminster, London, England
- Party: Communist Party of Great Britain
- Other political affiliations: Democratic Left
- Relatives: Julien Temple (brother); Juno Temple (niece)
- Education: Camden School for Girls; Imperial College London

Nina Claire Temple (born 21 April 1956) is a British politician who was the last Secretary of the Communist Party of Great Britain (CPGB) from 1990 to 1991. A member of the Eurocommunist faction, she previously served as General Secretary of the Young Communist League from 1979 to 1983, where she supported social policies including advocacy for gay rights within the communist movement.

Temple was involved in the dissolution of the CPGB in November 1991 and the founding of its successor organisation, Democratic Left. Following her political career, she worked as a think-tank director, including positions at the New Politics Network and Social Market Foundation. After being diagnosed with Parkinson's disease in 2000, she co-founded the choir Sing For Joy with Anne Hutchinson, Mike Power and Jonathon Knight for people with chronic degenerative diseases in 2003. She is the sister of film director Julien Temple and aunt of actress Juno Temple.

== Early life and education ==
Nina Claire Temple was born on 21 April 1956 and was raised in a council flat in St John's Wood. Her father, Landon Temple, ran the business Progressive Tours, a travel agency that organised trips to Siberia and Cuba, and also ecology and Russian language courses. Her mother was a schoolteacher. Temple's brother is the film director Julien Temple; through him, she is the aunt of actress Juno Temple. She was educated at Camden School for Girls, where she established a society with the mission of reforming the school rules, then earned a degree in materials science from Imperial College London.

Temple was born into a communist family: her father joined the CPGB in the 1950s after Stalin's reign ended; although her mother was also a party member, she resigned in the early 1970s because "they kept giving her membership card and any other communications for her to my father". At the age of 11, when the invasion of Czechoslovakia occurred, Temple reportedly argued with a neighbour about communist policy. She participated in the Aldermaston marches and protests against the Vietnam War. She joined the Young Communist League when she was 13 years old

== Communist Party of Great Britain ==
=== Young Communist League leadership ===
Temple was supported by YCL General Secretary Tom Bell as his potential successor. During the late 1970s, she was general secretary of the Young Communist League and became a prominent member of the Eurocommunist faction within the party. Under her leadership, the YCL embraced progressive social policies, including being the first communist youth organisation to push for recognition of gay rights within the Communist Party, which caused considerable debate within the party in 1976.

Temple's YCL also modernised its cultural approach, with a report to the League's 1979 Congress celebrating that their publication Challenge had "tuned into punk and reggae, unemployment and anti-racism, far ahead of the rest of the left and popular press". However, these changes contributed to the organisation's decline, and within a few years of significant structural and policy changes, the YCL was effectively dissolved in 1989.

=== Rise in the Communist Party ===
She became a member of the CPGB executive in 1979, and then a member of the Political Committee in January 1982. She was the Press and Publicity Officer of the CPGB from January 1983 until 1989.

In January 1990, at the age of 33, she was elected as general secretary of the party by the executive committee, who voted 34-1 in her favour (with three abstentions). In doing so, she beat other contenders including Martin Jacques, who the Liverpool Daily Post had identified as the most likely candidate for the job. On assuming the role, Temple decided to adopt the title of "secretary" because she viewed the title of "general secretary" as inappropriately grandiose in relation to the size of the party (then 7,500 members strong) and Stalinist. Francis Beckett argued that this was symbolic of her intention to distance herself from the past. She pledged to make the party "feminist and green, as well as democratically socialist." The New York Times reported that she earned a salary of approximately $12,000 in this job.

According to The Scotsman, party members described the election of its first female leader as "momentous." She was the second female leader of a political party in Britain—the first being Margaret Thatcher of the Conservative Party. When this was pointed out to her by journalist Anne Pickles, Temple responded, "Ha... well, yes, but there the similarity ends. In my view Mrs Thatcher is a woman who has done nothing for women. I would hope to be a feminist leader, not a leader who happens to be a woman." She was also the first non-Scottish CPGB leader in 34 years.

=== Dissolution and Democratic Left ===
In this role Temple became one of the leading proponents of the dissolution of the CPGB in November 1991, and the founding of its legal successor, the Democratic Left, proclaiming that "The internationalism of the 1990s will be as much informed by Greenpeace and Oxfam, as communism once was by Marx and Engels".

The dissolution was controversial within the communist movement. Many members disagreed with the decision to dissolve the CPGB and instead joined the Communist Party of Britain, which had broken away from the CPGB in 1988, while some Scottish members formed the Communist Party of Scotland. Temple supported the transformation of the CPGB into Democratic Left, which was established as a reformist political organisation rather than a traditional political party.

== Think tanks ==
The Democratic Left continued through the 1990s, becoming the New Politics Network in 1999. Temple was its first director and worked for five years for the Make Votes Count Coalition.

In June 2005, she started work as head of development and communications at the Social Market Foundation, a centre-ground think tank that promotes policies combining market mechanisms with social responsibility, a role she held until 2008.

== Personal life ==
Temple has two children with a schoolteacher, a daughter born in 1987 and a son born in 1988.

=== Family connections ===
Temple comes from a family with connections in both politics and entertainment. She is the sister of film director Julien Temple, known for his work on music documentaries and films including The Great Rock 'n' Roll Swindle and Absolute Beginners, as well as music videos for artists including David Bowie, Whitney Houston, and The Rolling Stones. Through Julien, she is the aunt of actress Juno Temple, who has appeared in films such as Atonement and the television series Ted Lasso. Juno Temple's mother is film producer Amanda Pirie.

=== Parkinson's disease and advocacy ===
Temple was diagnosed with Parkinson's disease in 2000 when she was 44 years old. Three years later, with support of the Parkinson's Disease Society, she created the Sing For Joy choir with Anne Hutchinson, Mike Power and Jonathon Knight for people impacted by long term medical conditions such as Parkinson's disease and multiple sclerosis. The choir performed to 300 attendees at the 2008 Trades Union Congress. Sing for Joy expanded to have two branches: one based in Kentish Town and one based in Bloomsbury. As of 2025, the choir in Kentish Town had over 25 members.

Party political offices
Preceded by Tom Bell	General Secretary of the Young Communist League; 1979 - 1983	Succeeded by Douglas Chalmers
Preceded by Gordon McLennan	General Secretary of the Communist Party of Great Britain; January 1990 - November 1991	Succeeded by post abolished
