= Hazel Waters =

British librarian, editor and historian

- Occupations: Librarian, editor
- Employer: Institute of Race Relations

Hazel Kathleen Waters is a British librarian, editor and historian. She was librarian of the Institute of Race Relations (IRR) and an assistant editor of the journal Race & Class. She has published on racism and Black people on the 19th-century British stage, particularly Ira Aldridge.

== Life ==
Waters became a full-time employee of the Institute of Race Relations in 1969. She worked there as senior librarian and later as assistant editor of Race & Class, collaborating with Ambalavaner Sivanandan.

In 2002 Waters gained a PhD from the University of London, with a thesis on the black presence on the English stage between the late-18th and mid-19th century. Her resultant monograph, Racism on the Victorian stage (2007), was welcomed as an "important book".

== Works ==
- (ed. with Ambalavaner Sivanandan) Register of research on Commonwealth immigrants in Britain. London: Institute of Race Relations, 1970.
- (with Cathie Lloyd) France: One Culture, One People?, Race & Class 32:3 (January–March 1991), pp.49–65
- (ed.) Resource directory on 'race' and racism in social work. London: Institute of Race Relations, 1993.
- 'The Great Irish Famine and the Rise of Anti-Irish Racism', Race & Class 37:1 (1995), pp.95–108
- 'Ira Aldridge and the Battlefield of Race', Race & Class, 45:1 (2003), pp.1–30
- Racism on the Victorian stage: representation of slavery and the black character. Cambridge: Cambridge University Press, 2007.
- 'Ira Aldridge's Fight For Equality', in Bernth Lindfors, ed., Ida Aldridge: the African Roscius. University of Rochester Press, 2007.
- Harriet Beecher Stowe's Other Novel — Dred on the London Stage, Race & Class 53:2 (2011), pp.81–82
