= Ambalavaner Sivanandan =

Sri Lankan writer and activist (1923–2018)

- Born: 20 December 1923; Jaffna, Sri Lanka
- Died: 3 January 2018 (aged 94); London, England
- Other names: A. Sivanandan; Siva
- Education: St. Joseph's College, Colombo
- Alma mater: University of Ceylon
- Occupations: Novelist, activist, writer
- Known for: Director of the Institute of Race Relations (IRR)
- Notable work: When Memory Dies (1997)
- Awards: Commonwealth Writers' Prize

Ambalavaner Sivanandan (20 December 1923 – 3 January 2018), commonly referred to as A. Sivanandan or "Siva", was a Sri Lankan Tamil novelist, activist and writer, director of the Institute of Race Relations (IRR), a London-based think tank. His first novel, When Memory Dies, won the 1998 Commonwealth Writers' Prize in the Best First Book category for Europe and South Asia. He left Sri Lanka after the 1958 riots.

== Early career ==
The son of Ambalavaner, a worker in the postal system who came from the village of Sandilipay in Jaffna in the north of the island of Sri Lanka (formerly Ceylon), Sivanandan was educated at St. Joseph's College, Colombo. There he was taught by J. P. de Fonseka, who inspired him with a love of the English language alongside his native Tamil. Sivanandan later studied at the University of Ceylon, graduating in Economics in 1945. He went on to teach in the Ceylon "Hill Country" and then worked for the Bank of Ceylon, where he became one of the first "native" bank managers.

On coming to the UK, after a spell as a clerk in Vavasseur and Co and unable to obtain work in banking, Sivanandan took a job in Middlesex libraries and retrained as a librarian. He worked variously in public libraries, for the Colonial Office library and in 1964 was appointed chief librarian at the Institute of Race Relations (IRR) in central London. The library on race relations built up by Sivanandan was, in 2006, moved to the University of Warwick Library, where it is known as the Sivanandan Collection.

== At the Institute of Race Relations ==
In 1972, following an internal struggle at the IRR (in which Sivanandan was a principal organiser) with staff and members on one side and the Management Board on the other, over the type of research the IRR should undertake and the freedom of expression and criticism staff could enjoy, the majority of Board members were forced to resign and the IRR was reoriented, away from advising government and towards servicing community organisations and victims of racism. Sivanandan was appointed as its new director.

In 1974, he was appointed editor of the IRR's journal Race, which was renamed Race & Class. Under his editorship, Race & Class – a journal for Black and Third World Liberation – became the leading international English-language journal on racism and imperialism, attracting to its editorial board Orlando Letelier, Eqbal Ahmad, Malcolm Caldwell, John Berger, Basil Davidson, Thomas Lionel Hodgkin, Jan Carew, and Manning Marable, among others.

== Writing and publishing ==
Sivanandan was regarded as one of the leading political thinkers in the UK. Most of his work was first published in the journal Race & Class. "The liberation of the black intellectual" (1977) examined identity, struggle and engagement during decolonisation and Black Power. "Race, class and the state" (1976) provided the first coherent class analysis of the black experience in Britain, examined the political economy of migration and coined the idea of state, structured racism. "From resistance to rebellion" (1981) tells the story of black protest in the UK from 1940 to 1981. "RAT and the degradation of black struggle" (1985) made the crucial distinction between personal racialism and institutional or state racism. "Race, terror and civil society" (2006) showed new racisms, such as the attack on multiculturalism and growth of anti-Muslim racism, thrown up by globalisation post-9/11. Changes in productive forces, especially the technological revolution, were themes taken up in "Imperialism and disorganic development in the silicon age" (1979) and "New circuits of imperialism" (1989)

Sivanandan's political non-fiction articles were published in a number of collections: A Different Hunger: writings on black resistance, 1982 (Pluto Press); Communities of Resistance: writings on black struggles for socialism, 1990 (Verso); Catching History on the Wing: Race, Culture and Globalisation, 2008 (Pluto Press). He was highly critical of some trends in modern leftism, such as the New Times political initiative of Marxism Today in the late 1980s, and of Postmodernism.

Sivanandan published an epic novel on Sri Lanka entitled When Memory Dies (Arcadia Books, 1997), which won the Commonwealth Writers' First Book Prize (for Eurasia) and the Sagittarius Prize. A collection of his short stories was published entitled Where the Dance Is (Arcadia Books, 2000). In the same year, Sivanandan collaborated with British band Asian Dub Foundation in their album Community Music, providing one of his treatises as lyrics for the track "Colour Line", and also lending his voice.

National Life Stories conducted an oral history interview (C464/76) with Ambalavaner Sivanandan in 2010 for its National Life Stories collection held by the British Library.

He is co-credited with coining the term xenoracism.

== Personal life ==
Sivanandan's first marriage in 1950 was to Bernadette Wijeyewickrema; they divorced in 1969, and he married his long-time partner, Jenny Bourne, in 1993.

A. Sivanandan died in London on 3 January 2018, aged 94.

== Bibliography ==
A full bibliography of works by A. Sivanandan is available at https://web.archive.org/web/20120324191945/http://www.irr.org.uk/pdf2/Sivanandan_bibliography.pdf.

=== Books and pamphlets ===
- Race and Resistance: the IRR story, London: Race Today Publications, March 1975
- A Different Hunger: writings on black resistance. London: Pluto Press. 1982. ISBN 9780861043712.
- Communities of Resistance: writings on black struggles for socialism. London: Verso. 1990. ISBN 9780860915140.
- When Memory Dies (a novel), London: Arcadia, 1997
- Where the Dance Is (short stories), London: Arcadia, 2000

=== Articles and papers ===
==== 1960s ====
- "The Ceylon scene", in IRR Newsletter (March 1966)
- "Fanon: the violence of the violated", in IRR Newsletter (N.S. Vol. 1, no. 8, August 1967)
- "White racism and black", in Encounter (Vol. 31, no. 1 July 1968)
- "A farewell to liberalism", in IRR Newsletter (N.S. Vol. 3, no. 4, April 1969)

==== 1970s ====
- "The politics of language 3: Ceylon, an essay in interpretation", in Race Today (Vol. 2, no. 6, June 1970)
- "Culture and identity", in Liberator (Vol. 10, no. 6, June 1970)
- "Revolt of the Natives", in Liberator (Vol. 11, nos. 1–2, January/February 1971)
- "Black power: the politics of existence", in Politics and Society (Vol. 1, no. 2, February 1971)
- "The passing of the king", in Race Today (Vol. 3, no. 4, April 1971)
- 'Thoughts on prison", in Race Today (Vol. 3, no. 10, October 1971)
- "The anatomy of racism", paper presented at Race Relations Research Conference, London, IRR, 18 February 1972
- "Skin: a one-act play", in Race Today (Vol. 4, no. 5, May 1972)
- "Angelus", in Race Today (Vol. 4, no. 7, July 1972)
- "Anatomy of racism: the British variant", in Race Today (Vol. 4, no. 7, July 1972)
- "Race, class and power: an outline for study", in Race (Vol. 14, no. 4, July/April 1973)
- "Opinion on academic violence", in Race Today (Vol. 5, no. 6, June 1973)
- "The Institute story: the unacceptable face", in Race Today (Vol. 6, no. 3, March 1974)
- "Alien Gods", in B. Parekh (ed.), Colour, culture and consciousness: immigrant intellectuals in Britain, London: George Allen and Unwin, 1974
- "Race, class and the state: the black experience in Britain", in Race & Class (Vol. 17, no. 4, Spring 1976)
- "Race and resistance: Asian youth in the vanguard", in Sandesh International Supplement (4 July 1976)
- "The liberation of the black intellectual", in Race & Class (Vol. 18, April 1977)
- "Race, class and the state 2: Grunwick: report on the West Indian community", in Race & Class (Vol. 19, no. 1, Summer 1977)
- "Report from Sri Lanka, August 1977", in Race & Class (Vol. 19, no. 2, Autumn 1977)
- "Sri Lanka: uses of racism", in Economic and Political Weekly (Vol 12, no. 41, 8 October 1977)
- "Grunwick 2", in Race & Class (Vol. 19, no. 3, Winter 1978)
- "From immigration control to induced repatriation", in Race & Class (Vol. 20, no. 1, Summer 1978)
- "The case for self-defence", in Rights (Vol. 3, no.3, January/February 1979) (with Jenny Bourne)
- "From immigration to repatriation: 'the imperial imperative': research perspectives in the field of immigrant labour", paper, Berlin: Berliner Institut fur Vergleichende Sozialforschung, June 1979.
- "Imperialism and disorganic development in the silicon age", in Race & Class (Vol. 21, no. 2, Autumn 1979)

==== 1980s ====
- "Die Neue Industrielle Revolution", in J. Blaschke and K. Greussing (eds), Europa: Probleme der Arbeitsmigration, Frankfurt: Syndikat, 1980
- "Race, class and caste in South Africa: an open letter to No Sizwe", in Race & Class (Vol. 22, no. 3, Winter 1981)
- "White man, listen", in Encounter (July 1981)
- "From resistance to rebellion: Asian and Afro-Caribbean struggles in Britain", in Race & Class (Vol. 23, nos. 2/3, Autumn 1981/Winter 1982)
- "The black struggle in Britain", in Heritage (No. 1, 1984)
- "London’s black workers", in Jobs for a Change (No. 8, May 1984)
- "Sri Lanka: racism and the politics of underdevelopment", in Race & Class (Vol. 21, no. 1, Summer 1984)
- "RAT and the degradation of black struggle", in Race & Class (Vol. 26, no. 4, Spring 1985)
- "In the castle of their skin", in New Statesman (7 June 1985) (extracts from "RAT…")
- "The sentence of racism", in New Statesman (14 June 1985) (extracts from "RAT…")
- "Britain’s Gulags", in New Socialist (November 1985)
- "Britain and the anatomy of racism", in Racial Justice (No. 3, Spring 1986)
- "Race, class and Brent", in Race & Class (Vol. 29, no. 1, Summer 1987)
- "Left, Right and Burnage: no such thing as anti-racist ideology", in New Statesman (27 May 1988)
- "The new racism", in New Statesman and Society (4 November 1988)
- "Rules of engagement", in International (February 1989)
- "New circuits of imperialism", in Race & Class (Vol. 30, no. 4, April/June 1989)

==== 1990s ====
- "Racisme", in La Breche (No. 445, 16 February 1990)
- "All that melts into air is solid: the hokum of New Times", in Race & Class (Vol. 31, no. 3, January/March 1990)
- "The enigma of the colonised: reflections on Naipaul’s arrival", in Race & Class (Vol. 32, no. 1, July/September 1990)
- "Whatever happened to imperialism?" in New Statesman and Society (11 October 1991)
- "Black struggles against racism", in CCETSW, Setting the Context for Change, London: CCETSW, 1991.
- "Letter to God", in New Statesman and Society (Christmas supplement, 1991)
- "From resistance to rebellion", in Texte zur Rassissmus Diskussion, Berlin: Schwarze-Risse, 1992
- "Into the waste lands", in New Statesman and Society (19 June 1992)
- "Race against time", in New Statesman and Society (15 October 1993)
- "Capitalism, globalisation and epochal shifts: an exchange", in Monthly Review (Vol. 48, no. 9, February 1997)
- "The making of home to the beat of a different drum", in Race & Class (Vol. 39, no. 3, January/March 1998)
- "Globalism and the Left", in Race & Class (Vol. 40, nos. 2/3, October 1998/ March 1999)
- "Seize the time", in CARF (No. 48, February/March 1999)

==== 2000s ====
- "The rise and fall of institutional racism", in CARF (No. 54, December/January 2000)
- "How Labour failed the Lawrence test", in The Guardian (21 February 2000)
- "Refugees from globalism", in CARF (No. 56, August/September 2000)
- "Reclaiming the struggle", in Race & Class (Vol. 42, no. 2, October/December 2000)
- "Poverty is the new Black', in The Guardian (17 August 2001)
- "Jan Carew, renaissance man", in Race & Class (Vol. 43, no.3, January/March 2002)
- "The Countours of Global Racism", Crossing Borders: the legacy of the Commonwealth Immigrants Act 1962, 15/16 November 2002
- "Globalism’s imperial war", in CARF (No. 70, Spring 2003)
- "We the (only) people", in CARF (No. 71, Summer 2003)
- "Race & Class – the next thirty years", in Race & Class (Vol. 46, no. 3, January/March 2005)
- "How Britain lets down minorities". The Observer. 16 October 2005.
- "Race, terror and civil society", in Race & Class (Vol. 47, January 2006)
- "Racisme, globalisering og krigen mot terror", in Samora (Nr 4/5, 2006)
- "The rules of the game", in Tony Bunyan (ed.), The War on Freedom and Democracy: essays on civil liberties in Europe (Nottingham: Spokesman, 2006)
- "Britain’s shame", in Catalyst (July/August 2006)
- "Attacks on multicultural Britain pave the way for enforced assimilation", in The Guardian (13 September 2006).
- "Liberal elitists who ignore the context of power and privilege". The Guardian. 30 November 2006.
