= Douglas Chalmers (politician) =

British politician (born 1957)

- Born: 1957 or 1958 (aged 65-66-67); Dundee, Scotland, United Kingdom
- Political party: CPGB (until 1991); Democratic Left (1991–1998)
- Movement: Perestroika

Douglas Chalmers (born 1957 or 1958) is a Scottish academic and former communist activist.

== Biography ==
Born in Dundee to parents who were members of the Communist Party of Great Britain (CPGB), Chalmers joined the Young Communist League and became its National Organiser in 1981, then replaced Nina Temple as General Secretary in 1983. As Secretary, he promoted a Eurocommunist line, which created conflict with a more feminist trend championed by the new National Organiser, Nina Brown. An incident where he called police to intervene at a fractious YCL meeting in Hackney proved controversial within the wider CPGB.

In 1985, Chalmers moved to become the CPGB's Scottish District Organiser. He stood for in Glasgow Govan at the 1987 general election, taking only 237 votes, then again at the 1988 Glasgow Govan by-election, where he increased his vote share to 0.9%.

He became the CPGB's final Scottish Secretary in 1989. In this role, he championed a Scottish Parliament and distanced the party from the collapsing regimes in Eastern Europe, while supporting perestroika. The party dissolved in 1991, and Chalmers became Scottish Convenor of its successor, Democratic Left. He was critical of its decision in 1993 to become a pressure group, but remained convenor until it was dissolved in 1998.

Chalmers next completed a PhD in Economics at Glasgow Caledonian University, then became a lecturer at the university, specialising in the links between the Scottish Gaelic language and economic development. He has also served on the BBC Broadcasting Council, is president of the Scottish University and College Union, and won an award from the Higher Education Academy for his use of virtual learning environments.

Party political offices
Preceded by Nina Temple	General Secretary of the Young Communist League; 1983 – 1985	Succeeded by Mark Ashton
Preceded by Jack Ashton	Secretary of the Scottish District of the Communist Party of Great Britain; 1989 – 1991	Party dissolved
