= New Times (politics) =

Western Communist intellectual movement and ideology

New Times was an intellectual movement that emerged among leftists in Great Britain during the late 1980s. The movement was centred on the Eurocommunist faction of the Communist Party of Great Britain (CPGB) and developed its theoretical framework primarily through the party's official journal, Marxism Today. New Times theorists, including Martin Jacques and Stuart Hall, argued that Western societies were undergoing a transformation from Fordism to Post-fordism, which they claimed required the left to adapt its political strategies and move away from traditional class-based approaches toward broader coalitions and identity politics.

The movement gained prominence with the launch of the "New Times" project in Marxism Today's October 1988 special issue, which asserted that mass production, big cities, and nation-states were in decline while flexibility, diversity, and decentralisation were ascendant. According to its proponents, the theoretical framework drew heavily on Antonio Gramsci's concept of hegemony and French regulation school economics to support a reformist rather than revolutionary approach to social change.

New Times reportedly had significant influence on British politics, particularly through its impact on Labour Party modernisation under Neil Kinnock and later Tony Blair. The movement also attracted substantial criticism, notably from A. Sivanandan, who argued that it legitimised Thatcherite values. Following the dissolution of the CPGB in 1991, many New Times adherents continued their work through Democratic Left and various New Labour think tanks.

== History ==
=== Background ===
Following the Soviet invasions of Hungary in 1956 and Czechoslovakia in 1968, many Western Communists began questioning their allegiance to the Soviet Union. Some disillusioned party members moved further left and joined Trotskyist organisations. Others, notably those following Enrico Berlinguer's Italian Communist Party (PCI), remained within their respective Communist Parties while developing independent critiques of Soviet policies. This latter group essentially expanded the "popular front" strategies of the 1930s, with various Communist Parties seeking accommodation with existing political establishments. This approach became known as Eurocommunism.

=== Eurocommunism in Britain ===
While Eurocommunist factions in the French and Italian communist parties largely succeeded in influencing party platforms, the situation was more contentious elsewhere. In Britain, internal struggles emerged from the 1970s onward. The CPGB became divided between 'Euros' (Eurocommunists) and 'tankies' (those who supported Soviet military interventions in Eastern Bloc countries).

The Eurocommunist faction gained control of Marxism Today. Martin Jacques became editor in 1977 and began publishing articles primarily by prominent Eurocommunists. Jacques has identified Eric Hobsbawm's 1978 article "Forward March Of Labour Halted?" as a turning point in the movement's development. During the early 1980s, the New Times concept began to develop. Stuart Hall became an influential theorist alongside Jacques. Articles in MT questioned traditional left positions on consumerism, the focus on material production and the industrial working class, and approaches to Margaret Thatcher. Hall's analysis in MT helped popularise the term "Thatcherism," contending that Thatcher represented more than conventional Conservative politics.

The movement was formally named "New Times" in Marxism Today's October 1988 special issue. This special edition declared that "Mass production, the mass consumer, the big city, big-brother state, the sprawling housing estate, and the nation-state are in decline: flexibility, diversity, differentiation, mobility, communication, decentralisation and internationalisation are in the ascendant. In the process our own identities, our sense of self, our own subjectivities are being transformed. We are in transition to a new era." By this point, the movement had reached considerable influence, reportedly affecting Neil Kinnock and later Tony Blair's reorientation of the Labour Party.

== Marxism Today and key publications ==
The transformation of Marxism Today under Martin Jacques' editorship from 1977 was central to the development of New Times thinking. Under Jacques, the magazine's circulation increased from 3,500 to 15,600, even as CPGB membership declined dramatically. The journal became what critics called the "theoretical organ of Labour revisionism."

Key articles that shaped New Times theory included Eric Hobsbawm's 1978 "Forward March of Labour Halted?," which challenged traditional labour movement assumptions about working-class unity and growth. Stuart Hall's numerous contributions developed the concept of Thatcherism as a new form of authoritarian populism that successfully combined free-market economics with traditional values.

The October 1988 special issue brought together contributions from various sociologists, economists, and cultural theorists. The issue included analyses of changes in work patterns, consumption, technology, and cultural identity, which the editors interpreted as evidence of what they termed a "post-Fordist" society.

== Theory ==
=== Post-Fordist analysis ===
According to New Times theorists, the 1980s and 1990s represented a fundamental break with previous historical patterns. Central to this analysis was the claimed transition from Fordism to Post-fordism, drawing on the work of French economists like Michel Aglietta and the Regulation School. The theoretical framework suggested that the mass production, mass consumption model of the post-war era was giving way to more flexible forms of production and consumption.

This transformation was characterised by several key features: the dispersal of workers from large industrial workplaces into service and public sectors; the replacement of blue collar employment with white collar positions; the democratisation of consumption patterns; and the rise of new technologies that enabled more flexible, decentralised forms of organisation.

=== Cultural and political implications ===
New Times theorists contended that these economic changes had profound cultural and political implications. They argued that the traditional working class, previously seen as the agent of socialist transformation, was fragmenting into diverse groups with different interests and identities. According to this analysis, the left needed to move away from class-based politics toward what would later be termed 'identity politics' – building coalitions among various groups including women, ethnic minorities, and other marginalised communities.

The movement drew on Antonio Gramsci's concept of hegemony, with theorists arguing that political change required winning the battle of ideas rather than simply capturing state power. This approach emphasised cultural politics and the importance of popular culture, media, and discourse in shaping political consciousness.

=== Analysis of Thatcherism ===
New Times theory included analysis of Thatcherism. Rather than viewing Thatcher's policies as a conventional extension of Conservative ideology, New Times theorists argued that Thatcherism represented a departure that combined free-market economics with authoritarian populism.

In Jacques' introduction to the 1988 special issue, he wrote that "at the heart of Thatcherism, has been its sense of New Times, of living in a new era... the Right has glimpsed the future and run with it." According to this analysis, the Conservative Party had been more successful than the left in recognising and adapting to post-Fordist conditions.

=== Political strategy ===
Regarding concrete political positions, New Times adherents generally aligned with broader Eurocommunist perspectives while going further in their rejection of traditional socialist goals. Rather than focusing on Communist Party organising or working-class mobilisation, New Times theorists sought to influence the wider left, particularly the Labour Party and Liberals.

New Times theorists rejected the goal of abolishing capitalism, attributing the failure of Bolshevism to what they termed 'voluntarism' – the attempt to impose socialist transformation without adequate regard for existing conditions. According to their theoretical framework, they advocated a reformist approach that emphasised adapting to existing conditions rather than pursuing revolutionary transformation.

== Key figures ==
Martin Jacques served as editor of Marxism Today from 1977 to 1991 and was identified as the primary architect of the New Times project. During his editorship, the magazine transformed from a traditional Communist Party journal into a platform for post-Marxist thinking. Jacques later became a prominent public intellectual, writing for mainstream publications and continuing to develop post-Fordist analysis well into the 21st century.

Stuart Hall is regarded as one of the most theoretically sophisticated of the New Times intellectuals. His work on cultural studies, identity, and hegemony provided theoretical foundation for the movement. Hall's analysis of Thatcherism as "authoritarian populism" became influential, arguing that Thatcher's success lay in combining free-market economics with appeals to traditional British values and nationalism.

Eric Hobsbawm, a prominent British historian, contributed historical analysis to New Times theory. His 1978 essay "Forward March of Labour Halted?" challenged assumptions about the inevitable growth and radicalisation of the working class, arguing that traditional labour politics were becoming obsolete. Hobsbawm later served as an advisor to Labour Party leader Neil Kinnock, contributing to the party's modernisation efforts.

The New Times movement included other intellectuals who contributed to its development. Geoff Mulgan, who later became a figure in New Labour think tanks; Charles Leadbeater, who contributed analysis of the "knowledge economy"; and academic contributors from fields including sociology, economics, and cultural studies contributed to New Times theory.

== Criticism and debates ==
The New Times project attracted criticism from various quarters of the British left. Critics argued that the movement had abandoned socialist principles and was providing intellectual legitimacy for Thatcherite policies.

=== Left-wing criticism ===
A prominent critique came from A. Sivanandan, director of the Institute of Race Relations, who published an attack in Race & Class in 1989. Sivanandan argued that class struggle remained central to capitalism and that New Times theorists were accommodating themselves to Thatcherism. His critique began:

"New Times is a fraud, a counterfeit, a humbug. It palms off Thatcherite values as socialist, shores up the Thatcherite market with the pretended politics of choice, fits out the Thatcherite individual with progressive consumerism, makes consumption itself the stuff of politics."

Sivanandan's critique was part of a broader left-wing response that accused New Times theorists of abandoning class analysis and providing intellectual cover for neoliberal capitalism. Critics from the traditional left argued that the movement's emphasis on consumption and lifestyle politics distracted from issues of economic exploitation and inequality.

=== Academic debates ===
The New Times thesis generated academic debate, particularly around the concept of post-Fordism. Critics such as Michael Rustin argued that the analysis overstated the degree of change in capitalist production methods and underestimated the continuities with earlier forms of capitalism.

Academic critics questioned whether the fragmentation of the working class was as complete as New Times theorists suggested, and whether identity politics could provide an adequate basis for progressive political change. Some scholars argued that the movement's analysis led to political fragmentation rather than the broader coalitions it purported to promote.

=== Responses from New Times theorists ===
New Times intellectuals responded to these criticisms, arguing that their critics were adhering to outdated models of social change. They maintained that traditional left politics had failed to address the realities of late 20th-century capitalism and that new forms of political organisation were necessary to achieve progressive change in post-Fordist conditions.

== Legacy ==
=== Influence on New Labour ===
A significant political legacy of the New Times movement was its influence on the modernisation of the Labour Party. Several New Times intellectuals contributed to this process. Eric Hobsbawm served as an advisor to Neil Kinnock, contributing to the party's response to electoral defeats in the 1980s. His historical analysis of the decline of traditional working-class politics provided intellectual framework for the party's shift toward middle-class voters.

During Tony Blair's leadership, the influence became more pronounced. Several of Blair's associates were former Communists influenced by Eurocommunist and New Times thinking, including Peter Mandelson, who had been a member of the Young Communist League, and John Reid, a former member of the Communist Party of Great Britain. In 1993, Martin Jacques, Charles Leadbeater, and Geoff Mulgan established Demos, which became an influential New Labour think tank. Demos promoted ideas that had originated in New Times thinking, including emphasis on post-industrial society, the importance of cultural politics, and the need for new forms of political organisation.

New Times emphasis on modernisation, flexibility, and adaptation to post-Fordist conditions became themes in New Labour's political rhetoric. Blair's "Third Way" politics shared similarities with New Times analysis, particularly in its rejection of traditional left-right divisions and its emphasis on pragmatic policy-making.

=== Critical assessment of Blair era ===
Many New Times theorists became critical of what they regarded as Blair's adoption of Thatcherite policies. They argued that while they had advocated adaptation to post-Fordist conditions, Blair had gone too far in embracing neoliberal economics and had departed from the progressive politics they had intended.

This tension reflected an ambiguity within New Times theory: while it advocated moving beyond traditional socialism, it remained unclear what political programme should replace it. Critics argued that this theoretical vacuum was filled by Blairite centrism rather than the progressive politics that New Times theorists had envisioned.

=== Institutional continuity ===
Democratic Left, an organisation established by former Marxism Today contributors in 1991 when the CPGB dissolved, sought to continue New Times thinking in a post-communist context. The organisation published a magazine also titled New Times, which continued until 2000, developing post-Marxist politics around themes of democratisation and social justice.

=== Theoretical influence ===
Beyond party politics, New Times theory influenced academic discourse, particularly in cultural studies, sociology, and political theory. The movement's emphasis on identity politics, cultural analysis, and post-Fordist economics became themes in 1990s social theory. The concept of "authoritarian populism" developed by Stuart Hall to analyse Thatcherism became used in political analysis.

The movement contributed to debates about the future of the left in post-industrial societies. While many of its specific predictions proved problematic, New Times raised questions about how progressive politics could adapt to changing economic and social conditions that remain relevant in contemporary political discourse.

== See also ==
- British left
