= Liz Fekete =

Author and director of the Institute of Race Relations

Liz Fekete is director of the Institute of Race Relations, where she has worked since 1982. She researches racism, Islamophobia and far-right extremism in Europe. She also speaks to the media on these topics. Fekete was a member of the Campaign Against Racism and Fascism (CARF).

Fekete's book A Suitable Enemy: Racism, migration and Islamophobia in Europe (Pluto Press, 2009) argued that European racism was shifting towards xenoracism in which discrimination operated on the level of religion or culture rather than skin colour. Reviewing it in the journal Translocations: Migration and Social Change, Kathleen M. Coll said it was an "utterly absorbing and deeply disturbing analysis of the recent rise of Islamophobia throughout Europe". In 2017, Fekete published Europe’s Fault Lines: Racism and the Rise of the Right on Verso Books. It was reviewed by Peace News, which commented that it equips a reader with the "intellectual arsenal to begin resisting fascism in all its guises." The Dublin Review of Books observed that she considers racism and fascism must be considered together.

== Selected works ==
- Fekete, Liz (April 2020). "Reclaiming the fight against racism in the UK". Race & Class. 61 (4): 87–95. doi:10.1177/0306396820911318. S2CID 216491597.
- Fekete, Liz (2018). Europe's fault lines: Racism and the rise of the right. London. ISBN 9781784787233.
- Fekete, Liz (2013). "The growth of xeno-racism and Islamophobia in Britain". In Lavalette, Michael; Penketh, Laura (eds.). Race, Racism and Social Work. pp. 33–52. doi:10.1332/policypress/9781447307082.003.0003. ISBN 9781447307082. S2CID 156099536.
- Fekete, Liz (January 2012). "The Muslim conspiracy theory and the Oslo massacre". Race & Class. 53 (3): 30–47. doi:10.1177/0306396811425984. S2CID 146443283.
- Fekete, Liz (2009). A suitable enemy: Racism, migration and Islamophobia in Europe. London: Pluto. ISBN 9781849644075.
