= Colin Prescod =

British sociologist and cultural activist (born 1944)

- Born: 1944 (age 80–81); Port-of-Spain, Trinidad and Tobago
- Education: University of Essex
- Occupation(s): Sociologist and cultural activist
- Employer: Institute of Race Relations
- Mother: Pearl Prescod

Colin Prescod (born 1944) is a British sociologist and cultural activist, originally from Trinidad, who in a career spanning five decades has worked as an academic, documentary filmmaker, theatre maker, and BBC Television commissioning editor, as well as being involved with many cultural and community projects. He is chair of the London-based Institute of Race Relations and a member of the editorial working committee of the international journal Race and Class. Other positions in which he has served include as a member of the (London) Mayor's Commission on African and Asian Heritage, on the Greater London Authority's Heritage Diversity Task Force, as founding-Chair (1993–2001) of The Drum Arts Centre in Birmingham, and Chair of the Association for Cultural Advancement through Visual Art, London.

== Background ==
Colin Prescod was born in Port-of-Spain, Trinidad. In 1958, aged 13, he moved to London to join his mother, Pearl Prescod, who had moved to Britain in the early 1950s and settled in Notting Hill.

Prescod studied sociology at the University of Essex. From 1969 to 1989, he was Senior Lecturer at the Polytechnic of North London. He was associated at its founding with The Black Liberator (1973–1978), a theoretical and discussion journal for Black liberation, started by Alrick Xavier (Ricky) Cambridge, and in the mid-1970s Prescod became connected with the Institute of Race Relations (IRR) and its journal Race & Class.

In 1982, he directed Struggles for Black Community, a four-part series of films commissioned and broadcast by Channel Four. In 1989, he left academia to pursue a career in film and television, joining the BBC. Starting work there as a producer, he became a commissioning editor and then from 1990 to 1992 was head of the African Caribbean Unit. He encouraged the production of documentaries, magazine programmes and talk shows, and charted the experiences of black migrants to Britain.

Prescod was Co-project Director of the European Multi-cultural Media Agency (EMMA), an initiative aiming to give documentary awards to young Europeans. He has also worked as an independent producer and consultant for film and television. As a cultural animator, specifically in the museums, archives, and heritage sector, he has been closely involved with such exhibitions as No Colour Bar: Black British Art in Action 1960–1990 (2016) and the British Library's Windrush: Songs in a Strange Land (2018).

== Personal life ==
Prescod lives with his Australian-born wife Nina in Notting Hill, at the same address where he has lived since 1958.
