= Saint Michael East (Barbados Parliament constituency) =

Parliamentary constituency in Barbados

- Constituency for the House of Assembly of Barbados
- Region: Saint Michael, Barbados

Current constituency
- Created: 1981

Saint Michael East is a constituency in the Saint Michael parish of Barbados. It was established in 1981. Since 2022, it has been represented in the House of Assembly of the Barbadian Parliament by Trevor Prescod, a member of the BLP. (Note: As with all constituencies, the constituency elects one member of parliament (MP) by the first past the post system of election at least every five years.) The Saint Michael East constituency is a safe seat for the BLP.

== Boundaries ==
The Saint Michael East constituency runs:

From the junction of Pine Plantation Road with the Pine East-West Boulevard in an easterly direction along the middle of the Pine East-West Boulevard to its junction with the Errol Barrow Highway; thence in a northerly direction along the Errol Barrow Highway to its junction with the “Bussa” Roundabout; thence in an easterly direction along Highway 5 (the Bridgetown-Mapp Hill Road) to its junction with Pasture Road; thence in a northerly direction along Pasture Road to its junction with Pasture Road-Haynes Hill Road; thence in an easterly direction along the Pasture Road-Haynes Hill Road to Haynes Hill; thence in a northerly direction along Haynes Hill to its junction with Monroe Road; thence in a westerly direction along the middle of Monroe Road to its junction with Roberts Road; thence in a northerly direction along the middle of Roberts Road to its junction with Highway 4 (the Bridgetown-Bulkeley Road); thence in a westerly direction along the middle of Highway 4 to its junction with Neils Plantation-Lower Estate Road; thence in a northerly direction along the middle of the Neils Plantation-Lower Estate Road to its junction with the Lower Estate-Belle Road; thence in a westerly direction along the middle of the Lower Estate-Belle Road to its junction with the Belle-Lears Road; thence in a northerly direction along the middle of the Belle-Lears Road to its junction with Highway 3 (the Waterford-Dayrells Hill Road); thence in a south westerly direction along the middle of Highway 3 to its junction with Waterford Cross Road; thence in a straight line drawn in the direction of the junction of Highway 4 with Belle Road; thence along this line to the point at which it is crossed by the watercourse running between the Belle Pumping Station and Bridge Road; thence in a southerly direction along the watercourse running between the Belle Pumping Station and Highway 4 terminating to the east of the Gas Station; thence in a westerly direction to its junction along the middle of Highway 4 to its junction with the Welches Road and Bridge Road; thence in a southerly direction along the middle of Welches Road to its junction with Pine Hill Road; thence in an easterly direction along the middle of Pine Hill Road to its junction with Pine Plantation Road; thence in a southerly direction along the middle of Pine Plantation Road to its junction with the Pine East-West Boulevard (the starting point).

== Members ==
Election	Member	Party
2018	Trevor Prescod	BLP
2022	Trevor Prescod	BLP

== Elections ==
=== 2022 ===
St. Michael East
Party	Candidate	Votes	%	±%
BLP	Trevor Prescod	2,167	64.3	−7.2
DLP	Nicholas Alleyne	1,019	30.2	+6.1
APP	Erskine Branch	186	5.5	+4.5
Majority		1,148	34.0	−13.4
Turnout		3,372		
BLP hold		Swing	-6.6	

=== 2018 ===
St. Michael East
Party	Candidate	Votes	%	±%
BLP	Trevor Prescod	3,408	71.5	+20.2
DLP	Nicholas Alleyne	1,147	24.1	−24.7
SB	Betty Howell	108	2.3	new
UPP	Paul Forte	47	1.0	new
Independent	Iramar Daisley	37	0.8	new
Barbados Integrity Movement	Catherine Yarde	20	0.4	new
Majority		2,261	47.4	+44.9
Turnout		4,767		
BLP hold		Swing	+22.5	
