= Jocelyn Barrow =

British educator, community activist and politician (1929–2020)

Dame Jocelyn Barrow DBE
- Born: Jocelyn Anita Barrow; 15 April 1929; Port of Spain, Trinidad and Tobago
- Died: 9 April 2020 (aged 90); London, England
- Education: Institute of Education, University of London
- Occupations: Educator, community activist, politician
- Known for: General Secretary of Campaign Against Racial Discrimination (CARD); First black woman to serve on the BBC Board of Governors
- Spouse: Henderson Downer (m. 1970)

Dame Jocelyn Anita Barrow DBE (15 April 1929 – 9 April 2020) was a British educator, community activist and politician, who was the Director for UK Development at Focus Consultancy Ltd. She was the first black woman to be a governor of the British Broadcasting Corporation (BBC) and was founder and Deputy Chair of the Broadcasting Standards Council.

== Early life and career ==
Jocelyn Barrow, daughter of Barbadian father Charles Newton Barrow and Olive Irene (nee Pierre), was born in Port of Spain, Trinidad and Tobago (her mother's native land), where she was active politically as a member of the People's National Movement. She undertook training to become a teacher, and in 1959 travelled to Britain for postgraduate studies, attending the University of London, where she read English.

Barrow was a founding member, general secretary and later vice-chair of Campaign Against Racial Discrimination (CARD) – the organisation that between 1964 and 1967 lobbied for race relations legislation and was responsible for the Race Relations Act of 1968. Barrow said in a 2019 interview: "Card was a very effective organisation though it wasn’t as grassroots as I would have liked it to have been. It was led by people like me, Lord [David] Pitt and Anthony Lester, a QC. The people at the bottom were too busy trying to survive though some did join."

Barrow was also a leading member of the North London West Indian Association (NLWIA), set up in 1965 as a major component of the West Indian Standing Conference, which had been founded in 1958 after the Notting Hill riots to speak out on behalf of West Indians; among other activities, the NWLIA responded to prejudice against black children in the state education system, which was exposed in a leaked report.

In 1968, she was appointed vice-chair of the International Human Rights Year Committee, and from 1968 to 1972 was a member of the Community Relations Commission. Barrow also held the post of vice-president of the National Union of Townswomen's Guilds.

As a senior teacher, and later as a teacher-trainer, at Furzedown Teachers College and at the Institute of Education in the 1960s, she pioneered the introduction of multi-cultural education, stressing the needs of the various ethnic groups in the UK. She was a member of the Taylor Committee of School Governors. In 1984, she co-founded Arawidi Publications, a children's publishing house, with Yvonne Collymore. Named after a Caribbean sun-deity, Arawidi published children's books in a variety of language forms including West Indian dialects and Glaswegian.

Between 1981 and 1988, Barrow served as a governor of the BBC, the first black woman to have been appointed to the board of the corporation, which in 2001 was controversially described by its then director-general Greg Dyke as still "hideously white". Barrow was also founder and deputy chair (1989–95) of the Broadcasting Standards Council, forerunner of Ofcom.

She was chair of the 2005 Mayor's Commission on African and Asian Heritage (MCAAH), set up by then Mayor of London Ken Livingstone, that produced the report Delivering Shared Heritage, about which she said: "Our findings and resulting recommendations, far from being of interest only to African and Asian communities, set out a code of values for delivering inclusive and healthy heritage management practice for everyone."

She was instrumental in the establishment of the North Atlantic Slavery Gallery and the Merseyside Maritime Museum in Liverpool. She was a Trustee of the National Museums and Galleries on Merseyside and a Governor of the British Film Institute, as well as the first patron of the Black Cultural Archives (BCA). Acknowledging the key influence she had in the founding of BCA, their tribute to her stated: "Also known as the African People's Historical Monument Foundation, Dame Jocelyn recognised the need for a national monument like BCA to educate future generations."

== Personal life ==
Jocelyn Barrow was married in 1970 to barrister Henderson (Hendy) Downer (d. January 2023) of Lincoln's Inn and the Jamaican Bar, and they lived in Long Yard, Lamb's Conduit Street. She died aged 90 on 9 April 2020, having been admitted to University College Hospital.

== Honours and legacy ==
In 1972, Barrow was awarded the OBE for work in the field of education and community relations. In 1992, her work in broadcasting and her contribution to the work of the European Union as the UK member of the Economic and Social Committee was recognised by her being appointed DBE, the first black woman thus to be honoured as a "Dame".

She was voted one of the "100 Great Black Britons" in the campaign launched by Every Generation Media in 2003, and in the 2020 relaunched list and accompanying book.

She received honorary doctorates from the University of Greenwich in 1993 and from the University of York in 2007.

Barrow was listed in June 2023 as one of the Windrush generation who struggled for civil rights in the UK.

== Other affiliations ==
- Governor of the Commonwealth Institute (for eight years)
- Council Member of Goldsmiths, University of London
- Vice-president of the United Nations Association in the UK
- National vice-president of the Townswomen's Guild
- Patron of the Black Cultural Archives
