= Gerry Gable =

British political activist (1937–2026)

- Born: 27 January 1937; London, England
- Died: 3 January 2026 (aged 88)
- Occupation: Editor of the anti-fascist Searchlight magazine
- Years active: 1960s–2025

Gerald Clark Gable (27 January 1937 – 3 January 2026) was a British political activist. He was a long-serving editor of the anti-fascist Searchlight magazine, stepping down on 7 March 2025.

== Background ==
Gerald Clark Gable was born in London on 27 January 1937. He had a Jewish mother and an Anglican father. He grew up in east London and identified as Jewish.

As a youth, Gable was a member of the Young Communist League and the Communist Party of Great Britain, and worked as a runner on the Communist Party's Daily Worker newspaper, leaving after a year to become a Communist Party trade union organiser. He stood unsuccessfully for the Communist Party in 1962 at Northfield Ward, Stamford Hill, North London. He left the Communist Party because of their anti-Israel policy and because "first and foremost [he has] always been a Jewish trade unionist".

Joined by other Jews and anti-fascists, many Jewish ex-servicemen and members of the veterans of the Spanish International Brigades, the militant anti-fascist organisation 62 Group was formed to confront fascists organising on the streets. Gable organised intelligence for the 62 Group on fascists, including using infiltrators to help build a defence policy for the community against fascist attacks.

This led to the formation of the anti-fascist magazine Searchlight in the mid-1960s, along with Reg Freeson, Joan Lestor, Maurice Ludmer and others. Gable and Ludmer remained active in Searchlight Associates and re-launched the magazine in 1975.

== Legal cases ==
=== 1963 burglary ===
In November 1963, the author David Irving called the London Metropolitan Police with suspicions he had been the victim of a burglary by three men who had gained access to his Hornsey flat in London claiming to be General Post Office (GPO) telephone engineers. Gable was convicted in January 1964, along with Manny Carpel. They were fined £20 each, with Gable being fined an additional £5 for the theft of a GPO pass.

=== BBC libel ===
In 1984, the BBC commissioned Gerry Gable to produce research for a BBC Panorama programme "Maggie's Militant Tendency". The episode was to focus on a claim of right-wing extremism in the Conservative Party. Gable claimed that his research drew upon the information previously published in Searchlight. The claims by Gable that two Conservative Party figures, Neil Hamilton and Gerald Howarth, were secret extremist Nazi supporters was met with libel action against the BBC. The programme had alleged (not admitted as evidence in court) that Hamilton gave a Nazi salute in Berlin while "messing around" on a Parliamentary visit in August 1983. The Guardian reported that "Writing for the Sunday Times after the collapse of the case, he admitted he did give a little salute with two fingers to his nose to give the impression of a toothbrush moustache. 'Somebody on the trip clearly did not share our sense of humour,' he wrote." The BBC later capitulated and paid the pair's legal costs. Hamilton and Howarth were awarded £20,000 each and in a subsequent edition of Panorama, the BBC made an unreserved apology to both.

=== Private Eye libel ===
In 1989, Private Eye magazine falsely claimed that Reginald Gulliver-Buckingham, a member of the military police, had plotted to abduct and murder Gable. The High Court ordered that substantial damages be paid by Private Eye to Gulliver-Buckingham due to the libellous claims.

== Death ==
Gable died on 3 January 2026, at the age of 88.
