= Julian Henriques =

British filmmaker and academic (born 1951)

- Born: 1951 (age 74–75); Leeds, Yorkshire, England
- Education: University of Bristol
- Occupations: Filmmaker, researcher, writer and academic
- Employer: Goldsmiths, University of London
- Notable work: Babymother (1998)
- Spouse(s): Parminder Vir, m. 1985
- Children: 2 daughters
- Relatives: Fernando Henriques (father): Pauline Henriques (aunt)

Julian Henriques (born 1951) is a British filmmaker, researcher, writer and academic. He is a professor at Goldsmiths, University of London, in the Media and Communications Department, with his particular research interests being culture, technology and reggae sound systems.

== Biography ==
Julian Henriques was born in Leeds, Yorkshire, England; his father, Fernando Henriques, was Jamaican and his mother was of Irish and English descent. When Henriques was 15 or 16 years old, he and his two brothers were taken to Jamaica by their father, which "was the beginning of a longstanding working relationship with the island".

In the 1970s, Henriques co-founded the journal Ideology and Consciousness, which published writing on new theories in modern psychology, and he remained on the journal's editorial staff until 1977. He began his film career in the 1980s, working at Channel Four Television and at BBC television on the programme Ebony and then in the Music and Arts Department on Omnibus and Arena. His independent productions include On Duty in 1984, and he directed Exit No Exit in 1988, and in 1992 We the Ragamuffin, as well as executive producing a number of documentaries for his production company with Parminder Vir, Formation Films, founded in 1987.

His first feature film as a writer and director was Babymother (1998), produced by Parminder Vir, about which Stuart Hall wrote in Sight and Sound: "This film is wired directly into the motor of assertive energy which is powering so-called multicultural Britain, to whose rhythm London is increasingly swinging." It is considered to be the first Black British musical and captures the British Caribbean dancehall cultural scene of London. It was also one of the few British musicals of its period. On 26 July 2021, the remastered film was reissued by the BFI and released on Blu-ray.

A psychology graduate of the University of Bristol, Henriques in 2008 earned a PhD from Goldsmiths, University of London, his doctoral thesis being titled "Sonic Bodies: the Skills and Performance Techniques of the Reggae Sound System Crew".

Henriques ran the film and television department at the Caribbean Institute of Media and Communication (CARIMAC) of the University of the West Indies in Mona, Jamaica, from 1996 to 2001, going on to become a lecturer at Goldsmiths, where he is convenor of the MA in Cultural Studies and the MA in Script Writing. His research focuses on street cultures, music and technologies, including those of the reggae sound system.

Also a sound artist, his installation Knots and Donuts was at the Tate Modern.

His books include Sonic Bodies: Reggae Sound Systems, Performance Techniques, and Ways of Knowing (2011), described by Stuart Hall as "an exciting text that is thoroughly grounded in Jamaican 'sonic' cultures, technically sophisticated, full of original insights, and theoretically bold and adventurous", and about which Dennis Howard said in Dancecult: Journal of Electronic Dance Music Culture: "Julian Henriques offers a fresh and illuminating exploration of Jamaican auditory culture through the reggae sound system, making a significant contribution to an aspect of Caribbean and Jamaican culture that is in dire need of interrogation and epistemological grounding."

His current research projects include The Sonic Womb, the Sound System Outernational research group, and Sonic Street Technologies, a European Research Council consolidator grant (2021–2025) on which he is Principal Investigator.

== Personal life ==
In 1985, Henriques married Parminder Vir, business executive, filmmaker and television producer, and they have two daughters: Mala and Anuradha. His father was eminent anthropologist Professor Fernando Henriques. Born in Jamaica in 1916 (with his notable siblings including Pauline Henriques and Cyril Henriques), Fernando at the age of three came to London, eventually attending Oxford University, where he became President of the Oxford Union in 1944, receiving his DPhil in 1948, and being appointed lecturer in Social Anthropology at Leeds in 1948, going on to be Dean of the Faculty of Economic and Social Studies – possibly the first Black academic in the UK to hold such a role.

== Selected filmography ==
- 1984: On Duty (producer)
- 1988: Brideshead and the Tower Blocks (producer)
- 1988: Exit No Exit (co-originator/producer – Formation Films for Channel Four)
- 1990: The Green Man (producer/director – BBC Omnibus)
- 1992: We the Ragamuffin (director, script writer)
- 1993: Derek Walcott: Poet of the Island (documentary; producer/director – BBC Arena)
- 1995: Rouch in Reverse (executive producer)
- 1998: Babymother (feature film; director, script writer)
- 2000: Ding Dong Merrily on High (director)
- 2019: Denzil's Dance (documentary; producer/director)

== Selected bibliography ==
- (With Wendy Hollway, Cathy Urwin, Couze Venn and Valerie Walkerdine) Changing the Subject: Psychology, Social Regulation and Subjectivity, 1998, Routledge, ISBN 9780415151382
- Sonic Bodies: Reggae Sound Systems, Performance Techniques, and Ways of Knowing, 2011. Continuum/Bloomsbury Publishing, ISBN 9781441144294
- "Hearing Things and Dancing Numbers: Embodying Transformation, Topology at Tate Modern", in Theory, Culture & Society, 4 October 2012.
- "Rhythmic Bodies: Amplification, Inflection and Transduction in the Dance Performance Techniques of the 'Bashment Gal'", in Body & Society, 6 October 2014.
- (Editor, with David Morley and Vana Goblot) Stuart Hall: Conversations, Projects and Legacies, 2018, Goldsmiths Press, ISBN 9781906897475
- Sonic Media: the Street Technology of the Jamaican Sound System, 2022, Durham, N.C.: Duke University Press (forthcoming).
