= Pauline Henriques =

Jamaican-born English actress (1914–1998)

Pauline Henriques OBE JP
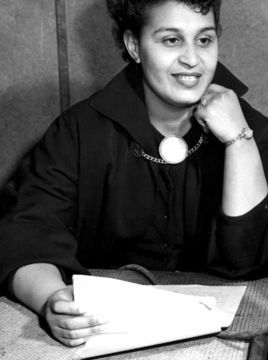
- Henriques, on BBC's Caribbean Voices in 1952.
- Born: 1 April 1914; Kingston, Jamaica
- Died: 1 November 1998 (aged 74); Brighton, Sussex, England
- Other name: Pauline Crabbe
- Education: London Academy of Music and Dramatic Art
- Occupation: Actress
- Known for: First black female actress for British television
- Relatives: Fernando Henriques (brother); Julian Henriques (nephew)

Pauline Clothilde Henriques (1 April 1914 – 1 November 1998), popularly known as "Paul," was a Jamaican-born English actress. In 1946, she became the first black female actress on British television. She was also the first black female Justice of the Peace, and was appointed an Officer of the Order of the British Empire (OBE) in 1969.

Henriques worked extensively with unmarried mothers and worked as a counsellor with, and later Secretary to, the Brook Counselling and Advisory Clinic.

== Early life ==
Pauline Henriques was born in Kingston, Jamaica, to Cyril Charles Henriques, a wealthy merchant, and Edith Emily Delfosse. Her father was of Portuguese and Jewish descent, while her mother was a "native of Haiti". One of six children, she moved with her family to England from Jamaica in 1919, as her father wanted to give his children an English education. Her elder brother, Cyril George Henriques (1908–1982), became a Lord Chief Justice of Jamaica and was knighted in 1963. Another brother, Fernando, was a President of the Oxford Union in 1944, and a published author.

Pauline and her siblings are mentioned in an exhibition about Jamaican families and their roles in the UK during the Second World War in Southwark.

In 1932, she enrolled in the London Academy of Music and Dramatic Arts to study drama. During this time she experienced challenges due to roles that were available to her, she explained in a later interview: "I appeared in many school productions, but I had to play my parts in white face, including Lady Bracknell and Lady Macbeth! I went along with it because I was very anxious to learn my craft, and to be taken seriously as a dramatic actress. You see, I couldn't sing or dance, and dramatic roles were non-existent for black actresses, so I had to "white up" to gain experience."

In 1936, Pauline married Geoffrey William Heneberry (1909–1994). Their daughter Gail (born 26 March 1937) later married Keith Critchlow, artist, author, and professor of architecture in England.

In 1948, Pauline Henriques married the actor, Neville Cobbiah Crabbe (1923–83), with whom she had one son, Biff Crabbe (born 1953). In 1969, she married Joe Benjamin (1921–1995), taking on three step-sons Mark (born 1952), Simon (born 1956) and Adam (1958). Pauline died in Brighton, Sussex, in 1998.

== Career ==
=== Acting and radio ===
Pauline Henriques was a regular presenter on Caribbean Voices for the BBC's West Indian Service, from the show's inception in 1943.

She broke more than one glass ceiling in her time, the first of which was as the first Black female actress on British TV in 1946. Cast as Hattie Harris in a 1946 BBC television version of Eugene O'Neill's play All God's Chillun Got Wings, Henriques continued to perform on stage and screen in a variety of roles during the 1950s. She was also cast as Ella in The Heart Within.

In 1948, she became a founding member of the Negro Theatre Company and directed a variety show called Something Different

She acted in the BBC's A Man from the Sun, a television drama documentary that for the first time portrayed the lives of Caribbean settlers in post-war Britain.

=== Counselling ===
During the latter part of her career, then known as Pauline Crabbe, she worked extensively in counselling unmarried mothers and was involved in championing counselling for pregnant teenagers, especially those under the age of 16, to determine whether abuse had been involved.

From 1957 to 1969, she was first welfare secretary and then Deputy General Secretary of the National Council for the Unmarried Mother and Her Child. In 1966, she helped form the Havistock Housing Trust, and in the following year was appointed to the Housing Corporation. From 1969 to 1971, she worked as a Conciliation Officer with the Race Relations Board, before moving to the London Brook Advisory Centre to work as first Secretary and then, from 1976 as Senior Counsellor until, in 1980, she was appointed as the National Vice-Chairman until her retirement in 1986. In 1977, she featured as a speaker at the Altrusa Convention, as the Secretary to the Brook Advisory Centres. She was also interviewed at length for the British Library's National Sound Archive.

For Channel 4's Faces of the Family show in 1994, Pauline appeared as the matriarch of an extended family.

For her role and responsibility towards women, she was quoted in the First Woman Sheriffs in the United States on the front page:

"Any woman who is a first in a field previously dominated by men has the responsibility of opening doors for other women."

== Works ==
- "Social and Emotional Aspects of Pregnancy in Teenagers", Journal of BioSocial Science 10 (1978), pp. 171–184.

Featured in:

- Bourne, Stephen (1998), Black in the British frame: Black people in British film and television, 1896–1996, Cassell, and (2025), Trailblazers of Black British Theatre. The History Press.
- Murray, Jenni (1996), The Woman's Hour: 50 Years on Women in Britain. BBC Books.
- Nicholson, Mavis (1995), What Did You Do in the War, Mummy? Chatto & Windus.
- Pines, Jim (editor) (1992), Black and White in Colour: Black People in British Television since 1936. BFI.
