= Pearl Prescod =

Tobagonian actress and singer (1920–1966)

- Born: Pearl Priscilla Prescod; 28 May 1920; Tobago, Trinidad and Tobago
- Died: 25 June 1966 (aged 46); Kensington, London, England
- Occupations: Actress and singer
- Years active: 1954–1966
- Children: Colin Prescod

Pearl Priscilla Prescod (28 May 1920 – 25 June 1966) was a Tobagonian actress and singer. She was one of the earliest Caribbean entertainers to appear on British television and was the first Black woman to appear with London's National Theatre Company.

Prescod arrived in Britain in the early 1950s and resided in Notting Hill, London. During her time in Britain, she was cast in numerous television roles and theatre productions, and was active in the anti-racism struggle in London in the late 1950s and early '60s. With her close friend, journalist and activist Claudia Jones, Prescod helped co-ordinate London's first "Caribbean Carnival" event, which took place in St Pancras Town Hall in January 1959, and is considered a precursor of the Notting Hill Carnival.

== Career ==
Pearl Prescod was a trained classical singer and had aspirations to pursue a classical music education in England. She arrived in Britain in the early 1950s after winning a musical scholarship to Guildhall School of Music.

In 1954, Prescod was cast in Barry Reckord's first play Flesh to a Tiger (previously called Della). The play also starred Cleo Laine, Nadia Cattouse and Lloyd Reckord.

In 1955, the secretary of the West India Committee in London helped Prescod secure a job as a switchboard operator in his office and an audition at the BBC. She successfully procured a number of BBC contracts and landed many television roles and plays over the years.

Prescod was part of a West Indian singing group called The New World Singers and was the leader of the sopranos in the choir. The others were Patricia Williams (Saint Vincent), Bonica Fletcher (Jamaica) and Joyce Jacobs (British Guiana). Impressed with hearing a group of West Indian singers, conductor and composer Avril Coleridge-Taylor formed the choir.

In 1959, Sylvia Wynter's play Under The Sun was re-broadcast by the BBC. Prescod had a part in the play, along with Nadia Cattouse, Andrew Salkey, Sheila Clarke, Gordon Woolford and Sylvia Wynter.

During her stage career, Prescod was a member of London's National Theatre Company, then based at the Old Vic, and was cast as Tituba in the 1965 production of The Crucible. She received wide praise for her performance.

== Activism ==
Prescod's contributions to the struggle for racial equality in Britain was recognised. She played an active role alongside Claudia Jones, and was involved in organising the March on Washington solidarity demonstration in London on 31 August 1963. Prescod was among the Black artistes in England who supported Claudia Jones's appeals for funds for the West Indian Gazette by organising and performing at fundraising concerts. When Jones died in 1964, Prescod sung "Lift Up Your Voice and Sing" at the funeral.

== Death ==
Prescod died on 25 June 1966 from a brain hemorrhage in Kensington, London, and was survived by her son Colin Prescod, a sociologist and trustee of the Friends of the Huntley Archives at LMA.

== Legacy ==
Prescod is the subject of a chapter written by Obi B. Egbuna, the Nigerian-born novelist, playwright and political activist, in his non-fiction work titled Black Candle at Christmas.

In 2022, the Institute of Race Relations' Black History Collection produced a biographical text dedicated to charting Prescod's life. A review of Pearl Prescod: A Black Life Lived Large in The Guardian described the educational pamphlet as "part of an endeavour to shine a light on the overlooked stories of this generation of Caribbean artists and intellectuals", adding: "There is so much to unearth in the case of Prescod's short but glittering life and work." The IRR project co-ordinator Anya Edmond-Pettitt notes that Prescod's story may have been hitherto forgotten because it differs from the prevailing narrative about the so-called "Windrush generation": "It's not to say that [the Windrush] narrative isn't true or important but it's not the only story. There were people who came from the Caribbean who did not become bus drivers, hospital porters and nurses. There's a strange blindspot in that this is the only story we have of colonial migration to this country from the Caribbean."

Colin Prescod situates his mother's legacy within that of the wider community of performing artists and intellectuals who came from the West Indies/Caribbean to Britain, describing the biographical pamphlet as an "archival teaser" since there are many such life stories yet to be formally archived (including, as he observes, those of Nadia Cattouse, Earl Cameron and Errol John): "This little piece of history ... is part and parcel of the stir caused by 'the West Indian generation' as the late George Lamming called them – the generation who came out of militant anti-colonial political cultures to see off Empire and questioned the racist-Imperialism at the core of Great Britain’s colonial success story."

== Filmography ==
Year	Title	Role	Notes
1956	A Man from the Sun	Cast member	TV Movie
1957	The Buccaneers	Nanny Macao	TV Series
1958	Storm Over Jamaica	Mrs. Morgan	
1958	Television Playwright	Maisie	
1958	BBC Sunday-Night Theatre	Cast member/Ward Nurse	TV Series ("The Green Pastures"/"No Deadly Medicine")
1959	ITV Television Playhouse	Mrs. Jackson	TV Series ("The Blood Fight")
1960	Saturday Playhouse	Sarah	TV Series
1960	No Kidding (also called Beware of Children)	Black Mother	
1960	Eugene O'Neill: Three Plays of the Sea The Moon of the Caribbees, Bound East for Cardiff & In the Zone	Bella	TV Movie
1960/61	Danger Man	Chloe/Native Woman	Two TV episodes ("Colonel Rodriguez"/"Deadline")
1961	Flame in the Streets	uncredited	
1961	Hurricane	Marie Robinson	TV Series
1962	Dark Pilgrimage	Three street-walkers	TV Movie
1962	BBC Sunday-Night Play	Esther	TV Series ("The Day Before Atlanta")
1962	The Saint	Hotel Maid	TV Series ("The Arrow of God")
1963	Jezebel ex UK	Miss Philpott	TV Series
1963	Harold Was Alright	Nurse	
1963	Your World	Mrs. Williams	TV Series
1963	Friday Night	Nurse	TV Series
1964	Armchair Theatre	Cleaner	TV Series ("Sharp at Four")
1965/66	Danger Man (US: Secret Agent)	Madame Celeste/Millie	Two TV episodes ("Parallel Lines Sometimes Meet"/"The Man on the Beach")
1965	Barney Is My Darling		TV Series
1965	The Crucible	Tituba	
1966	Naked Evil	Landlady	uncredited
1967	The Deadly Affair	Play Spectator	uncredited

== See also ==
- Amy Ashwood Garvey
- Cy Grant
- Edric Connor
- Pearl Connor-Mogotsi
