= Marion Patrick Jones =

Trinidadian novelist and activist (1931–2016)

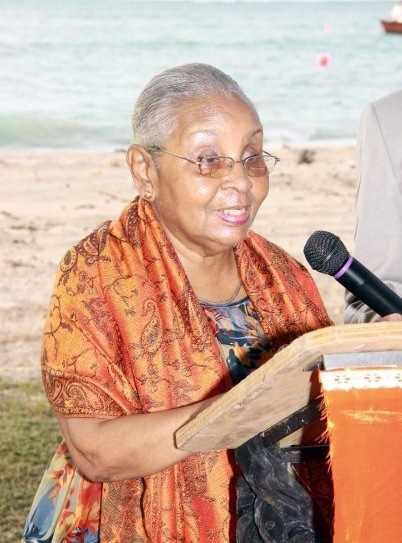
- Jones in 2016
- Born: Marion Patrick Jones; 16 August 1931; Woodbrook, Port of Spain, Trinidad and Tobago
- Died: 2 March 2016 (aged 84); Port of Spain, Trinidad
- Education: St Joseph's Convent; Imperial College of Tropical Agriculture, St Augustine; University of London (BSc), London School of Economics
- Occupations: Novelist, librarian and community activist
- Spouse(s): Benedict Glean; Maurice O'Callaghan
- Writing career
- Pen name: Marion Glean; Marion O'Callaghan; Marion Glean O'Callaghan
- Notable works: Pan Beat (1973); J'Ouvert Morning (1976)

Marion Patrick Jones (16 August 1931 – 2 March 2016) was a Trinidadian novelist, whose training was in the fields of library science and social anthropology. She is also known by the names Marion Glean and Marion O'Callaghan (her married name). Living in Britain during the 1960s, she was also an activist within the black community. She was the author of two notable novels – Pan Beat, first published in 1973, and J'Ouvert Morning (1976) – and also wrote non-fiction.

== Early life ==
Jones was born in Woodbrook, Port of Spain, Trinidad and Tobago, in 1934. She graduated from St Joseph's Convent — an exclusive Roman Catholic girls' school in Port of Spain run by Irish nuns, the Sisters of Cluny — winning the Girls' Open Island Scholarship in 1950, and placing third. She attended the Imperial College of Tropical Agriculture, St Augustine, one of the first two women to be admitted.

In the 1950s Jones went to New York City, where she earned a diploma in library science, paying for her education by working in a ceramics factory painting the wares. She worked with Manny Spiro to create a trade union. She then returned home to become a chartered librarian, working as Senior Librarian at Carnegie Library, San Fernando, Trinidad. In the 1960s, she continued her studies in Britain, graduating with a BSc degree from the University of London. She did postgraduate studies in social anthropology at the London School of Economics, writing a thesis on the Chinese community in Trinidad.

== Activism in Britain, 1960s ==
A pacifist and a Quaker, known as Marion Glean during her time in Britain, she played a prominent role within the black community and "contributed to a series of statements by post-colonial activists on 'race' in the run-up to the 1964 UK general election, published by Theodore Roszak, editor of Peace News." As Kalbir Shukra describes in The Changing Pattern of Black Politics in Britain (1998): "After the election, Glean brought together Alan Lovell and Michael Randle, who were pacifists and former members of the Committee of 100, with other friends who had written for Peace News including an Asian woman, Ranjana Ash (an active member of the Movement for Colonial Freedom), C. L. R. James and Barry Reckord (African-Caribbean playwright and actor)."

The initial outcome was that a debating group called Multi-Racial Britain was formed; however, when Martin Luther King Jr. was on his way to Stockholm to receive the Nobel Peace Prize, Glean arranged with Bayard Rustin for King to come to London to address a meeting, which was chaired by David Pitt. According to The Guardian′s report at the time: "Mrs Glean, together with Canon L. John Collins, hastily assembled about 30 Indians, Pakistanis, West Indians, and Africans...at the Hilton Hotel in London, where Dr King spoke for only a few minutes. The whole discussion lasted only an hour and a half, but at the end of it the new movement was formed and Mrs Glean appointed secretary." The movement founded at that gathering in December 1964 was the Campaign Against Racial Discrimination (CARD), which was formally launched soon afterwards.

== Writings, 1970s ==
She worked as Director of Social Science Programmes for UNESCO in Paris from 1965 to 1990, during which time she used her married name Marion O'Callaghan, or Marion Glean O'Callaghan, for her non-fiction writings, particularly on Africa. She was in charge of the anti-apartheid programme at UNESCO.

As Marion O'Callaghan she wrote "Introductory Notes" for a symposium, Sociological Theories; Race and Colonialism, published by UNESCO in 1980.

Her first novel, Pan Beat (1973), was about steelband and the involvement of women in its development. Her other novel, J’Ouvert Morning, was published in 1976, and examines middle-class predicaments in a society with a colonial heritage. These were published under the name Marion Patrick Jones. Lloyd W. Brown commented on her work: "In spite of the soap operatic quality of her narrative materials, Jones's novels succeed as riveting documents of a troubled society in a state of transition. ...despite Jones's melodramatic tendencies, the characters are vividly drawn and the language—especially in J'Ouvert Morning —is original and invigorating." According to Jennifer Rahim, "The author's invaluable contribution to the region's literature is her sensitive analysis of the Trinidadian urban middle class, as it strives to escape poverty and anonymity."

Writing by Jones appears in such collections as Her True-True Name: An Anthology of Women's Writing from the Caribbean (eds Pamela Mordecai and Betty Wilson, 1989), Caribbean Women Writers: Essays from the First International Conference (ed. Selwyn R. Cudjoe, 1990) and Daughters of Africa: An International Anthology of Words and Writings by Women of African Descent (ed. Margaret Busby, 1992).

As Marion O'Callaghan, she wrote a weekly commentary column in the Trinidad and Tobago Newsday newspaper.

After retiring from UNESCO in 1990, she lived in Trinidad. She died aged 84 at her home in Port of Spain on 2 March 2016.

== Family ==
Her father Patrick Jones (1876–1965), of African/Chinese heritage, was a leading Trinidadian trade unionist and socio-political activist at the turn of the 20th century. He was also a well known calypsonian who used the sobriquet "Cromwell, the Lord Protector" (popularly called "Chinee Patrick"), and sang what he called "the first political cariso" in 1920. In addition he is notable as the first pyrotechnist in Trinidad and Tobago, manufacturing fireworks from the end of the 1920s.

She was married to Benedict Glean, and to the late Maurice O'Callaghan, who came to Trinidad from Cork in Ireland to help establish the Presentation Brothers' school, Presentation College, in San Fernando at the end of the Second World War.

== Bibliography ==
=== Fiction ===
- Pan Beat. Port of Spain: Columbus, 1973.
- J'Ouvert Morning. Port of Spain: Columbus, 1976.

=== Non-fiction ===
- Namibia: The Effects of Apartheid on Culture and Education. Unesco, 1977. ISBN 978-9231014765
- Southern Rhodesia: The effects of a conquest society on education, culture, and information. Unesco, 1977. ISBN 978-9231013935
