= Searchlight (magazine) =

British magazine

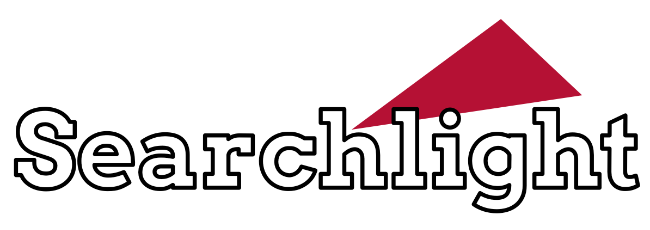
- Categories: Politics
- Frequency: Quarterly
- Founded: February 1975; 51 years ago
- Company: Searchlight Magazine Ltd
- Country: United Kingdom
- Based in: London
- Language: English
- Website: searchlightmagazine.com
- ISSN: 0262-4591

Searchlight is a British magazine, founded in 1975 by Gerry Gable and Maurice Ludmer, which publishes exposés about racism, antisemitism and fascism in the United Kingdom and elsewhere.

Searchlight's main focus is on the far right in the United Kingdom, as well as covering similar entities in other countries. An archive of historical materials associated with the magazine, The Searchlight Archive, is housed at the University of Northampton.

The magazine was published quarterly, but ceased physical publication after the Spring 2025 issue, the 50th anniversary of it being in print. Investigations and reporting continue to be posted online.

== History ==
The current Searchlight magazine was preceded by a newspaper of the same name, which was founded in 1964 by left-wing Labour Party Member of Parliament Reg Freeson with Gerry Gable as "research director". In 1967, in the fourth issue of the paper, Freeson announced his decision to stand down as editor after being promoted to a ministerial role in the UK government. He said that fellow MP Joan Lestor would be taking over as editor, but no further issues were actually published. However, Gable, Maurice Ludmer and others stayed together as Searchlight Associates. In 1974 they published the pamphlet 'A Well Oiled Nazi Machine', in response to the rise of the National Front. This brought renewed attention to the group, and helped raise funds to establish a monthly magazine in 1975. The pilot issue of the new Searchlight appeared in February 1975, with Ludmer as Managing Editor and Gable as Editor.

Ludmer and Gable were also amongst the first sponsors of the Anti-Nazi League, with Ludmer sitting on its first steering group.

In the Ludmer years, Searchlight had a close relationship with CARF, the Campaign Against Racism and Fascism, a magazine published by the (London) Anti Racist-Anti Fascist Co-ordinating Committee (a Federation of the Anti-Fascist Committees that had sprung up all over London in the mid-1970s). CARF merged with Searchlight in 1979, becoming an insert (with separate editorial control) at the back of the magazine, but this arrangement ended following disagreements in the early 1990s. When CARF launched its own separate magazine, it led the first issue with a statement explaining the split from Searchlight. This centred on CARF being unhappy that Searchlight was, in its view, over-focused on antisemitism and not focused enough on anti-black racism.

After Ludmer's early death in 1981, British academic Vron Ware briefly took over the editorial role until 1983. Following this Gable returned as editor, in a role he held until 1999.

The British National Party made a complaint to the Charity Commission of England and Wales about Searchlight and the associated Searchlight Educational Trust. The two anti-fascist bodies were investigated as it had been claimed that the Educational Trust had been engaging in political activity incompatible with its charitable status.

The commission's report stated that, in its opinion, the Searchlight Educational Trust had gone beyond the commission's guidelines on political activities. The charity agreed to follow the commission's recommendations after the complaint was upheld in 2003 with the Commission deciding that there was a need for a greater distinction between the public activities of Searchlight magazine and the educational trust. No action was taken against Searchlight.

Consequently, Searchlight divided into three main bodies: Searchlight magazine, the monthly anti-fascist and anti-racist magazine; Searchlight Information Services (SIS), a research and investigatory body which briefs governments, politicians, journalists, and the police; and, finally, Searchlight Educational Trust (SET), a charity devoted to challenging and defeating the extremism, racism and fascism. SIS and SET later joined the Hope not Hate campaign, and are no longer associated with Searchlight magazine.

Since Searchlight split with Hope not Hate in September 2011, Searchlight has opposed co-operation with the state.

== Criticism ==
In his history of Anti-Fascist Action (AFA), author Sean Birchall includes several instances of what AFA considered questionable tactics by Searchlight. In the 1980s, Direct Action Movement, which had been part of AFA, was among the first to criticise Searchlight's motives and tactics.

Also, in 1984, editor Gerry Gable was commissioned by the BBC to provide research materials for a Panorama programme, "Maggie's Militant Tendency". The episode was to focus on a claim of right-wing extremism in the Conservative Party. Gable asserted that his research drew upon the information previously published in Searchlight. In response to the claims by Gable that two Conservative Party figures, Neil Hamilton and Gerald Howarth, were secret extremist Nazi supporters, actions for libel were brought against the BBC and Gable. The programme had alleged (not admitted as evidence in court) that Hamilton gave a Nazi salute in Berlin while 'messing around' on a Parliamentary visit in August 1983. The Guardian reported that "Writing for the Sunday Times after the collapse of the case, he admitted he did give a little salute with two fingers to his nose to give the impression of a toothbrush moustache. "Somebody on the trip clearly did not share our sense of humour," he wrote." On 21 October, the BBC paid the pair's legal costs. Hamilton and Howarth were awarded £20,000 each, and in the next edition of Panorama, on 27 October, the BBC made an unreserved apology to both. The case against Gable was dropped.

Gable's leaked 1977 London Weekend Television memo stated that he had "given names I have acquired to be checked out by British/French security services". A 1987 profile referred to Gable's "wide range of contacts, including people in the secret services".

Larry O'Hara commented in a book on political organisations published in 1994:

"Without doubt there are matters on which Searchlight is usually reliable—election results, court-cases, as well as the occasional publication of primary source documents. Outline sketches of individual careers are of rather more mixed reliability. And when it comes to actual interpretation of the significance of events on the far Right, Searchlight is often very questionable indeed."

== Relations with other anti-fascist groups ==
The magazine has hostile relations with some other anti-fascist groups in Britain. The magazine group was originally part of the steering committee of Unite Against Fascism and resigned their position after differences over tactics.

Sonia Gable wrote critical articles on her blog about Searchlight's former creation, Hope not Hate, a highly visible civil rights campaign from which it split in late 2011.

Despite this, Searchlight maintains friendly relationships with other groups, such as Australia's FightDemBack and some other groups.

== Informants ==
Searchlight relies for its material on those involved in the far right. This includes a range of infiltrators, defectors and casual informers. The best-known defectors were Ray Hill, and Matthew Collins, now of the Hope not Hate campaign.

In 2013 it was revealed that BNP member Duncan Robertson had been a Searchlight informer, in particular of the New Right group.

== Campaigns ==
In the early years of the 21st century, Searchlight launched two interlinked anti-BNP and anti-racism campaigns, Stop the BNP and Hope not Hate. Hope not Hate received endorsement and national publicity from the Daily Mirror newspaper, and revolved around an annual two week bus tour in the run-up to local elections.

In the 2010 general election campaign, SIS spent in excess of £319,000, primarily targeting the BNP.

Since Searchlight split from Hope not Hate, it has concentrated on publishing the results of its investigation, research and intelligence gathering and supporting direct action against fascist demonstrations, such as those of the English Defence League in Walthamstow on 1 September 2012 and Chelmsford on 18 August 2012. As well as articles exposing the BNP, EDL and the moves towards the formation of a new party spearheaded by the former BNP MEP and veteran fascist Andrew Brons, Searchlight has focused on the areas where the far right and Conservative ultra right meet, such as the Traditional Britain Group, and the New Right, the powerhouse of far-right ideological development.

== Arts ==
Searchlight has a long-standing affiliation with the arts, which was strongly championed by former editor Maurice Ludmer. In the past this included a regular monthly column "What their papers say" which took a satirical look at the current political landscape.

Searchlight runs regular benefit events which feature the work of folk singers, poets and other arts professionals. On 6 January 2014 it launched a new arts section on its website. This opened with the fictional diary of Greg Goode, a US national recently moved to London in search of the truth. The column, which runs monthly, features a bizarre blend of rhyming poetry, hyperbolic narrative and song.

In the Autumn of 2014 Searchlight launched a standalone online arts magazine called Searchlight Magazine Arts The site contains interviews, articles, songs, fiction and documentaries, and celebrates the diverse arts movement in the UK and further afield. The aim of the magazine is to tell the arts stories no one else is telling and to put a wry slant on a range of unusual topics and causes.

== Archive ==
In 2012, Searchlight magazine partnered with the University of Northampton to create the Searchlight Archive. The archive is "one of the most extensive and significant resources of its type in Europe." Open to the public since 2013, it features a wide range of original source material, including oral histories, back editions of magazines, journals, flyers and other materials from groups on the far-right as well as far-left. The collection's largest section of material is on far right movements, such as the British National Party.

== See also ==
- Red Flare
- Southern Poverty Law Center
