= Babymother =

1998 film by Julian Henriques

- Directed by: Julian Henriques
- Written by: Julian Henriques; Vivienne Howard
- Produced by: Parminder Vir
- Starring: Anjela Lauren Smith; Wil Johnson; Caroline Chikezie; Jocelyn Jee Esien; Don Warrington; Tameka Empson; Diane Bailey; Vas Blackwood
- Cinematography: Peter Middleton
- Music by: Carroll Thompson; Beres Hammond
- Distributed by: Channel Four Films
- Release date: 11 September 1998
- Running time: 82 minutes
- Country: United Kingdom
- Language: English
- Budget: £2 million
- Box office: £62,928

Babymother is a 1998 British musical comedy drama film directed by Julian Henriques and released by Channel Four Films. It is considered to be the first Black British musical and captures the British Caribbean dancehall cultural scene of London. Babymother was also one of the few British musicals of its period.

== Plot ==
In the London district of Harlesden, Anita is a single mother dreaming of becoming a reggae singer, but living in a run-down council estate with little financial support, and conflict with her children's father, Byron, dents her dreams. Despite no funds for a studio demo, she has talent and ambition, and with her equally ambitious two friends, the trio pin their hopes on an upcoming singing contest to make it big.

== Cast ==
- Anjela Lauren Smith as Anita
- Wil Johnson as Byron
- Caroline Chikezie as Sharon
- Jocelyn Jee Esien as Yvette
- Don Warrington as Luther
- Tameka Empson as Dionne
- Diane Bailey
- Vas Blackwood

== Production ==
Babymother was directed and written by Julian Henriques, his first feature film, and was produced by his wife Parminder Vir. Henriques is of Jamaican background and a resident of Harlesden, where the film is set in. The film's budget was £2 million and was funded by Arts Council England.

== Release ==
Babymother opened in the UK on 11 September 1998 and three days later was screened at the Toronto International Film Festival. The film did not receive much attention among major filmgoers and it has been considered a rare production. It made its name more as a cult film. Since release it has been seldom aired on Film4 TV.

On 26 July 2021, the film was reissued by the BFI in remastered 2K and released on Blu-ray. The release includes interviews with the director and other staff, as well as We the Ragamuffin, a 1992 short production by Henriques.

== Reception ==
On Metacritic it holds a score of 48 based on 4 critic reviews.

Empire gave the film 2 stars out of 5, noting that Henriques tackles subjects such as feminism and tensions in the black community, but with little depth. The reviewer gave criticism to the main character Anita, "[delivering] her dialogue as if reading from an autocue." The review did, however, praise the strong supporting cast. A Time Out review was critical of Anita's character, but gave her praise as a vocalist (Smith) and called the closing two songs "excellent".

The film received new attention upon its 2021 Blu-ray release. Rewind DVDCompare gave the film a score of B+, calling it a "flat out fun and unique film." Cineoutsider.com said it is a film "with its place in history".

== Musical numbers ==
Original songs performed in the film are:

No.	Title	Writer(s)	Performer(s)	Length
1.	"Lover Man"		Wayne Marshall
2.	"Trust Me"	Beresford Hammond
3.	"Return Of The Don"	Beresford Hammond
4.	"Steppin' Ina NW10"		Superflex
5.	"The Clash"	Superflex	Superflex
6.	"These Lips Don't Lie"	Mikey Bennet, Verese Vassell
7.	"Rude Girls"	Carroll Thompson	Trilla Jenna
8.	"Forgive Me"	Carroll Thompson
9.	"I Don't Care"	Carroll Thompson	Trilla Jenna
10.	"Boasty Bwoy"	Carroll Thompson
11.	"Action"	Carroll Thompson	Trilla Jenna
12.	"Babymother"	Carroll Thompson	Trilla Jenna
13.	"Girls"	Anthony Kelly, Steven "Lenky" Marsden	Governor Tiggy
14.	"Perfect Lady"	Carroll Thompson	Peter Hunnigale

== See also ==
- British Black music
