= Mayor's Commission on African and Asian Heritage =

Commission established by the Mayor of London

Mayor's Commission on African and Asian Heritage (also known as MCAAH) was established by Ken Livingstone when he was Mayor of London. MCAAH was convened from August 2003 to June 2004 and was chaired by Dame Jocelyn Barrow. More than 20 practitioners, policy-makers and academics were appointed as commissioners and met around a programme of 15 sessions across London. The MCAAH's report, Delivering Shared Heritage (July 2005), was launched at the Victoria and Albert Museum.

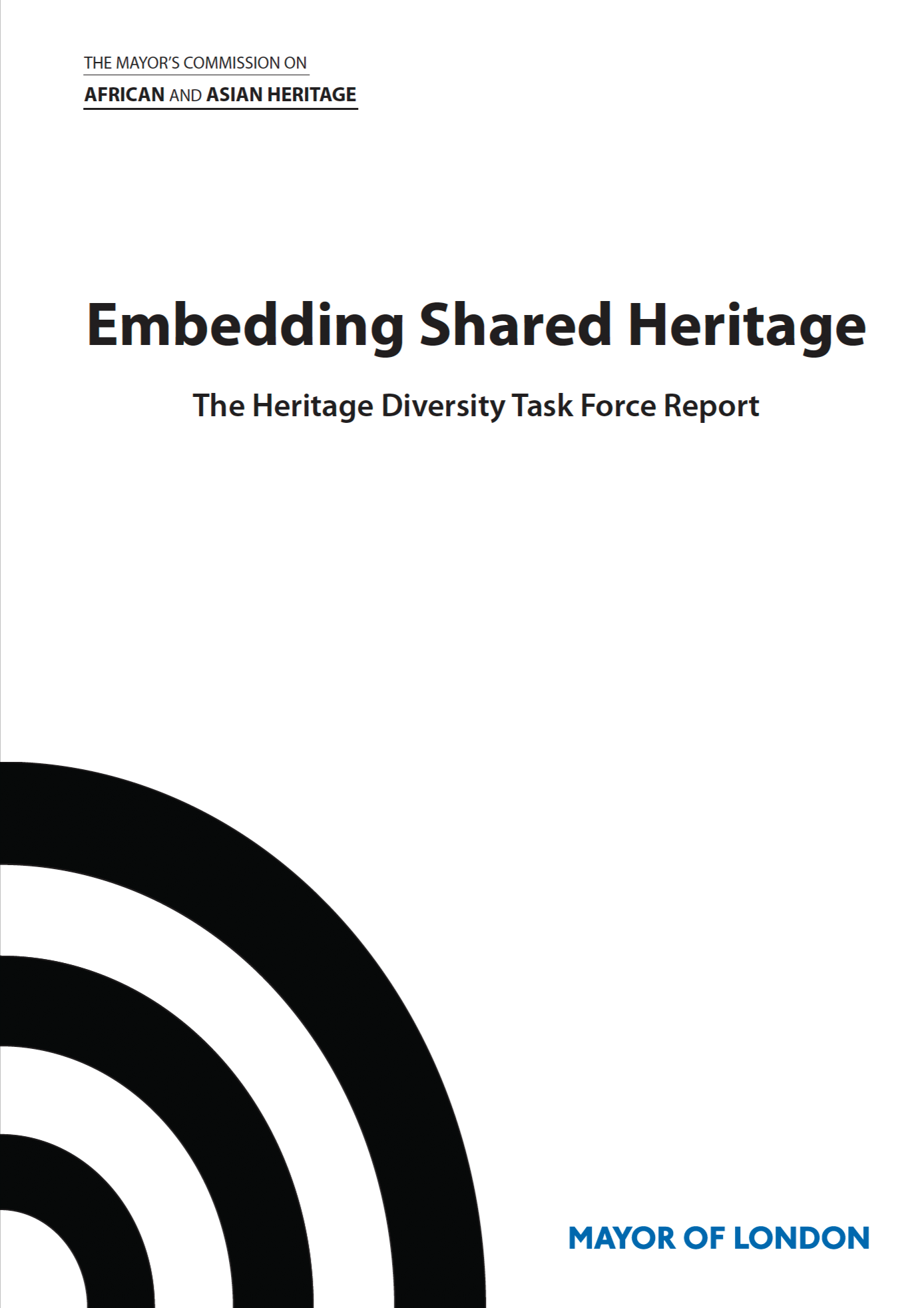
Embedding Shared Heritage publication cover design by Lucas Tang

A key recommendation of MCAAH was the establishment of The Heritage Task Force, set up when Boris Johnson was Mayor of London. The Task Force had a much reduced profile and there was a significant change in language and emphasis. The Task Force published Embedding Shared Heritage: The Heritage Diversity Task Force Report in November 2009. This publication was designed by designer Lucas Tang.

Commissioners were:

- Colin Prescod
- Irna Mumtaz Qureshi
- Hakim Adi
- Caroline Bressey
- Hilary Carty
- Augustus Casely-Hayford
- Stella Dadzie
- Morgan Dalphinis
- Melissa D'Mello
- Lee Hong Fulton
- Shreela Ghosh
- Raminder Kaur
- Chandan Mahal
- Ken Martindale
- Maxine Miller
- Heidi Safia Mirza
- Ron Ramdin
- Sajid Rizvi
- Patrick Vernon

== See also ==
- Commission for Diversity in the Public Realm
