= Parminder Vir =

Parminder Vir OBE
- Born: April 1955 (age 70–71); Punjab, India
- Citizenship: United Kingdom
- Occupations: Business executive, filmmaker and TV producer
- Spouse(s): Julian Henriques, m. 1985
- Children: 2 daughters

Parminder Vir OBE (born April 1955) is a British business executive, filmmaker and television producer.

== Biography ==
Vir was born in April 1955 in Punjab, India. She moved to England with her family when she was 10 years old. Her sister Arun also became a filmmaker.

Vir started out as an arts administrator with the Minorities' Arts Advisory Service before moving on to the Commonwealth Institute. She then joined the Greater London Council as Head of the Race Equality Unit for Arts and Recreation.

In 1986, Vir produced a showreel on black filmmaking in Britain, which was viewed by senior BBC executives and led to an offer of work there. Starting out as a researcher, she progressed to assistant producer and eventually to series producer, staying with the BBC until 1994. Thereafter, she continued to make programmes for the BBC under the aegis of her own production company, Formation Films.

In 1991, she produced two programmes for the BBC series Our War, in which Middle Eastern directors explored the effect of the Gulf War on their different countries and people. This was followed by more international documentaries such as Algeria – Women at War (1992, made for Channel 4's Critical Eye season), The Sex Warriors and the Samurai (1995, for Channel 4's Secret Asia series), African Eyes on Europe (1995, broadcast ZDF/Arté, Germany), and a mini-series on the 50th anniversary of the United Nations. In 1998, she produced the feature film Babymother, a reggae musical set in West London, and in 2000 she produced the second series of Single Voices, four half-hour comedy monologues by selected writers.

She worked with leading media investment companies in the UK including Ingenious Media Investments and Goldcrest Films, where she advised on the investment of a £20m capital fund that included investments in Oscar-winning and critically acclaimed feature films.

In May 1996, Vir was appointed the diversity advisor at Carlton Television and in 1999 to the board of the UK Film Council. She also served on other private and public sector boards including the UKTI Asia Task Force, UK India Business Council, Non-Executive Director of Goldcrest Films, the Department for Culture, Media, and Sport, and The Indus Entrepreneurs UK.

Vir was the chief executive officer of the Tony Elumelu Foundation from 2014 till 2018, and is a senior adviser to the Harambe Entrepreneur Alliance.

=== Recognition ===
Vir was appointed an Officer of the Order of the British Empire (OBE) for her services to the broadcasting and film industry during the 2002 Birthday Honours.

== Personal life ==
In 1985, she married Julian Henriques, film director and professor of media and communications at Goldsmiths, University of London, and they have two daughters.
