= Campaign Against Racial Discrimination =

British anti-racist organization

The Campaign Against Racial Discrimination (CARD) was a British organization, founded in 1964 and which lasted until 1967, that lobbied for race relations legislation. The group's formation was inspired by a visit by Martin Luther King Jr. to London in December 1964 on his way to Oslo to receive the Nobel Peace Prize. The Trinidadian pacifist Marion Glean, then a graduate student at the London School of Economics, arranged with Bayard Rustin for King to meet a group of Black spokespersons and activists at the Hilton Hotel, where an ad hoc committee was formed for a movement to "agitate for social justice and oppose all forms of discrimination", with CARD formally being launched at the next meeting on 10 January 1965.

CARD's founding members included Jocelyn Barrow as well as Marion Glean, politician Anthony Lester, London County Councillor David Pitt, historian C.L.R. James, Dipak Nandy and the sociologist Hamza Alvi. Lawyer Richard Small served as CARD's press officer.

== See also ==
- Runnymede Trust
- Race Relations Act 1968
