= Xenoracism =

Form of prejudice

Xenoracism is a form of prejudice that resembles racism but it is exhibited by members of a racial group towards other members of it, or it is exhibited towards members of an otherwise mostly indistinguishable racial group which may have no phenotypical differences but it is perceived as being alien, foreign, other, or culturally inferior.

== Origins and evolution ==
The term has been coined by race and racism scholar Ambalavaner Sivanandan and expanded on by other scholars like Liz Fekete. Sivanandan defined it in his 2001 article Poverty is a New Black as "xenophobia that bears all marks of the old racism, except that it is not colour coded. It is racism in substance, though xeno in form." Fekete expanded the term to describe Islamophobia in Europe, suggesting that the same phenomenon affects communities that have settled in Europe for decades and have been previously more integrated, but whose members are now seen as foreigners, though scholars are still discussing whether this term should indeed apply to wider context.

== Usage ==
The term xenoracism has been used to describe racism which has been experienced by white Eastern European economic migrants in Western Europe at the turn of the 21st century, following the fall of communism and the enlargement of the EU. Among others, this term has been used to describe the discriminatory treatment of Poles in the United Kingdom as well as the discriminatory treatment of Romanichal in the United Kingdom or West Africans in Italy. The term has also been used to describe older phenomena, such as the discrimination against Irish people in the United Kingdom. Additionally, it has been suggested that this term is similar to and overlaps with historical and modern anti-semitism and Islamophobia.

Other groups which are commonly affected, in addition to immigrants, are refugees, asylum seekers, and other displaced people, though some scholars think that racism against such groups may merit a different term.

The concept has also been used in the analysis of the racism in the United States.

== See also ==
- Anti-French sentiment
- Anti-German sentiment
- Anti-Irish sentiment
- Anti-Polish sentiment
- Anti-Russian sentiment
- Anti-Slavic sentiment
- Black Power
- Economic discrimination
- Ethnocentrism
- Nativism (politics)
- Reverse racism
- Xenophobia
