= Trevor Prescod =

Barbadian politician

Member of the House of Assembly of Barbados for Saint Michael East
- Incumbent
- Assumed office 24 May 2018

Personal details
- Party: Barbados Labour Party

Trevor A. Prescod is a Barbadian politician from the Barbados Labour Party (BLP).

== Political career ==
Prescod is a veteran politician and Pan-Africanist. In the 2018 Barbadian general election, was elected in Saint Michael East.

After the 2026 Barbadian general election, he was appointed Minister in the Prime Minister's Office with responsibility for Pan African Affairs and Heritage.
