= Democratic Left (Great Britain) =

1990s UK political party

- Predecessor: Communist Party of Great Britain
- Successor: New Politics Network; Democratic Left Scotland
- Formation: 11 November 1991
- Dissolved: December 1998
- Type: Think Tank, campaign group
- Legal status: Dissolved
- Headquarters: 6 Cynthia Street, London N1 9JF
- Region served: England, Scotland, Wales
- Members: 1,600 (1991); 836 (1998)
- Secretary: Nina Temple

Democratic Left was a post-communist political organisation that operated in the United Kingdom from 1991 to 1998. It emerged from the Eurocommunist faction within the Communist Party of Great Britain (CPGB) and was closely associated with the magazine Marxism Today, which ceased publication around the same period.

The organisation was founded on 11 November 1991 following the CPGB's decision to dissolve and reconstitute itself as a left-wing reformist think tank and grassroots campaign group. This transformation was guided by the party's Manifesto for New Times, which outlined a vision for post-communist politics in Britain. Nina Temple, who had served as the final general secretary of the CPGB, became the organisation's secretary. Temple, who had been Press and Publicity Officer of the CPGB from 1983 to 1989 before becoming general secretary in 1990 at age 33, was one of the leading proponents of the CPGB's dissolution.

The CPGB's transformation into Democratic Left proved controversial within the party. Many members rejected this reformist direction and instead affiliated with the Communist Party of Britain, which had split from the CPGB in 1988, while others in Scotland established the Communist Party of Scotland.

== Intellectual origins and the "New Times" project ==
Democratic Left's theoretical foundation was rooted in the "New Times" intellectual movement that had emerged within Marxism Today during the 1980s. This movement, led by figures such as Martin Jacques, Stuart Hall, and Eric Hobsbawm, argued that the late 1980s represented a fundamental break with previous history, transitioning from Fordism to Post-Fordism. The "New Times" theorists contended that workers in western nations were no longer concentrated in large workplaces but were increasingly employed in the service and public sectors, requiring new political strategies beyond traditional class-based approaches.

The influence of these ideas extended far beyond the Communist Party. Hobsbawm served as an advisor to Neil Kinnock, while many members of Blair's inner circle were former Eurocommunists influenced by the "New Times" school. Stuart Hall's analysis of Thatcherism - a term he pioneered - was cited by Labour Party figures in discussions about political strategy and messaging.

== Worldview ==
Democratic Left advocated for a pluralist and socialist society that it considered "incompatible with the structures and values of capitalism." Although initially conceived as a political party, the organisation abandoned plans to field candidates and instead endorsed tactical voting strategies against the Conservative Party during the 1992 general election, subsequently evolving into a non-partisan campaigning organisation.

The organisation pursued a broad range of progressive causes, including trade union modernisation through its Unions21 initiative, anti-racism and cultural diversity campaigns, democratic reform via the Make Votes Count campaign, and anti-poverty work through the Social Exclusion Network. Democratic Left emphasised coalition-building and functioned primarily as what scholars have described as a 'socialist anti-Conservative front'.

== Influence on the Labour Party ==
According to political historians, Democratic Left's intellectual framework, rooted in the "New Times" analysis, influenced discussions within the Labour Party during the 1990s. The movement represented a shift away from traditional socialism toward what would become the Third Way politics associated with New Labour. Ideas developed within Marxism Today and carried forward by Democratic Left - particularly around moving beyond class-based politics and embracing post-industrial economic realities - were among those discussed during the Labour Party's ideological debates under Neil Kinnock and Tony Blair. This intellectual influence was facilitated by direct personal connections, as many former CPGB members and "New Times" theorists became advisors to Labour leadership.

In 1997, Democratic Left published a series of policy magazines titled Futures in an attempt to address declining membership. The organisation faced internal tensions in 1998 when members of the Trotskyist-dominated Socialist Alliance attempted to join. After blocking this through legal action, Democratic Left's leadership concluded it needed to avoid becoming "stuck in the swamp of sectarian politics." The organisation stated this decision reflected its goal of moving beyond traditional left-wing sectarianism toward a more inclusive, pluralistic approach to progressive politics.

== Dissolution and successor organisations ==
In December 1998, Democratic Left in England and Wales was formally dissolved and reconstituted as the New Times Network, which adopted a more inclusive membership policy that welcomed members of the Labour Party and other political organisations. The new body published a monthly magazine, New Times, and worked with the Fabian Society to organise the 'Getting Real' conference in June 1999. The New Times Network was subsequently renamed the New Politics Network in December 1999. In Scotland, the organisation evolved separately into Democratic Left Scotland, which was established in May 1998.

== Legacy and historical significance ==
Political scholars have characterised Democratic Left as a transitional organisation in British left-wing politics, representing a shift between traditional communist ideology and the social democratic politics of the 1990s and 2000s. The organisation's focus on moving beyond class-based politics, embracing post-industrial economic realities, and developing new forms of progressive coalition-building reflected themes that later appeared in New Labour's approach. The "New Times" intellectual framework that informed Democratic Left's worldview was part of broader theoretical discussions about political change in the post-Cold War era, with some influence on British politics and international discussions about the future of the left.

== See also ==
- Democratic Party of the Left - post-communists in Italy
- Party of Democratic Socialism - post-communists in Germany
- SEARCH Foundation - post-communists in Australia
