= Maurice Ludmer =

British journalist and activist

Maurice Ludmer (1926–1981) was a British anti-fascist activist and journalist.

== Biography ==
=== Early life ===
His father was a Salford hairdresser and mother a teacher of Hebrew. His family moved to Birmingham in 1939. As a young man he was interested in sport. He joined the Young Communist League.

=== World War II ===
During the Second World War he served in the British Army. The shock of a visit to Belsen concentration camp which influenced the rest of his life.

=== Sports journalism and anti-racism (1950s – 1975) ===
He became a sports journalist by trade. In the 1950s he became active in local politics in the Midlands, particularly tenants' associations and the peace movement. But following the Notting Hill riots 1958, the controversial Smethwick election and the anti-immigration Immigration Control Associations, he became an active anti-racist.

In 1961 (when the first Commonwealth Immigration Bill was being discussed in parliament), Ludmer, with Birmingham activists of the Indian Workers Association such as Jagmohan Joshi, set up the Co-ordinating Committee Against Racial Discrimination (CCARD) which opposed both state racism and far right activism. CCARD also organised demonstrations over international issues such as the Vietnam War and against British colonial rule in Africa. It helped launch the more broad-based national organisation Campaign Against Racial Discrimination (CARD). In the late 1960s he resigned from the Communist Party which he felt was not fighting hard enough against racism.

Ludmer continued to oppose organised fascism and was attacked by fascists on several occasions.

=== Searchlight magazine and later life (1975–1981) ===
In February 1975, he launched the magazine Searchlight, with the aim of 'turning the searchlight on the extremists'. It reprinted on its cover the famous 1930s anti-fascist slogan 'They shall not pass'.

The magazine managed to infiltrate anti-fascists into right-wing groups, gathering secret information about fascist activities. For example, it exposed the existence of Column 88, the controlling group of the hard-line British Nazi underground, the annual Nazi reunions in Europe, and the British National Front's attempts to infiltrate trade unions.

Ludmer spoke up for black peoples' right to self-defence against racist attacks. In 1976 he wrote: 'The days have long gone when Asians, Blacks and Jews will meekly accept a role as the convenient scapegoats for the ills of society. Nor will those who cherish democratic ideals sit back while fascism tries to grow on the dunghill of racialism. Notice has been served that unless full protection is provided within the law against racist violence, intimidation and harassment, then those who are the intended victims reserve the right to organise their own protection in co-operation with all those growing sections of society, who abhor the politically motivated racism of the extreme right and fascist organisations.'

Ludmer was a member of the steering group of the first Anti-Nazi League in 1977–78. A Manchester Anti-Nazi League activist recalled that 'Maurice was a firm part of the Labour movement. He was a Communist, and the President of Birmingham Trades Council. The people who initiated the Anti-Nazi League had to have Maurice's support.'
