= Race & Class =

Academic journal on racism and imperialism

- Discipline: Anthropology, political science, sociology
- Language: English
- Edited by: Jenny Bourne; Hazel Waters

Publication details
- Former name: Race
- History: 1959–present
- Publisher: SAGE Publications on behalf of the Institute of Race Relations
- Frequency: Quarterly
- Impact factor: 2.6 (2022)

Standard abbreviations
- ISO 4: Race Cl.

Indexing
- ISSN: 0306-3968 (print); 1741-3125 (web)
- LCCN: 75641645
- OCLC no.: 2240562

Links
- Journal homepage; Online access; Online archive

Race & Class is a peer-reviewed academic journal on contemporary racism and imperialism. It is published quarterly by SAGE Publications on behalf of the Institute of Race Relations and is interdisciplinary, publishing material across the humanities and social sciences.

== History ==
The journal was established in 1959 as Race, before obtaining its current title in 1974 (when it was subtitled Journal for Black and Third World Liberation). The new editor, Ambalavaner Sivanandan, rejected what he saw as the arid scholarship of its predecessor, calling out instead to the "Third World intelligentsia, its radicals and political activists, its refugees and exiles".

Race & Class covered events that shaped the 1970s, specifically the period's widespread and rapid social and political changes, liberation struggles and the installation of popular governments in some of the newly independent countries of the Third World, the phenomenon of Black Power, and the Movement of Non-Aligned Countries. The journal was opened to radical scholars and activists, three of whom were so closely involved in the liberation movements they wrote of – Orlando Letelier, Malcolm Caldwell and Walter Rodney – they were killed in the pursuit of their realization.

== Abstracting and indexing ==
The journal is abstracted and indexed by EBSCO databases, Current Contents/Social and Behavioral Sciences, International Bibliography of the Social Sciences, MLA International Bibliography, and the Social Sciences Citation Index. According to the Journal Citation Reports in 2011, Race & Class had an impact factor of 2.6, ranking it 13 out of 92 in the category "Anthropology", 6 out of 20 in "Ethnic Studies", and 49 out of 149 in "Sociology".
