= Communist Party of Scotland =

Communist Party of Scotland Pàrtaidh Co-Mhaoineach na h-Alba
- Founded: January 1992
- Dissolved: Circa 2018
- Headquarters: Glasgow
- Ideology: Communism; Scottish independence
- Political position: Far-left

The Communist Party of Scotland (CPS; Scottish Gaelic: Pàrtaidh Co-Mhaoineach na h-Alba) was a communist political party based in Scotland. It was established in January 1992 by former members of the Communist Party of Great Britain who disagreed with the CPGB's disbanding and reforming in 1991 as the Democratic Left think-tank. The party was itself dissolved in the late 2010s.

== History ==
The CPS was set up in mid-January 1992 by former CPGB members who disagreed with the party's dissolution. The party headquarters at its founding were based in Partick, Glasgow.

Leading members of the CPGB in Scotland joined the new party, including Mick McGahey, who had been a leading member of the National Union of Mineworkers in the 1970s and 1980s, and former CPGB General Secretary Gordon McLennan. Willie Clarke, a CPGB councillor in Fife since 1973, joined the CPS but sat as an independent councillor until his resignation on the grounds of ill health in 2016.

Unlike the Communist Party of Britain (CPB), which broke away from the CPGB in 1988, the CPS supported Scottish independence and pro-independence initiatives like the Scottish Independence Convention (SIC) and Independence First. In 2007, the CPS published a discussion pamphlet titled Perspectives for Scottish Independence with contributions from Eric Canning, Maggie Chetty and Rhona Fleming. In 2008, the CPS organised a conference aimed at "uniting the left in Scotland around a number of shared political positions on Scottish independence".

Canning died in December 2017 while in office as national secretary of the CPS. The Scottish Socialist Party paid tribute to his "unshakeable commitment to the cause of socialism and independence".

== Works cited ==
- Hearn, Jonathan (2000). Claiming Scotland: National Identity and Liberal Culture. Edinburgh University Press. ISBN 1902930169.
