= Marxism Today =

Theoretical magazine of the Communist Party of Great Britain

- Discipline: Marxism
- Language: English

Publication details
- History: 1957–1991
- Publisher: Communist Party of Great Britain

Standard abbreviations
- ISO 4: Marx. Today

Indexing
- ISSN: 0025-4118
- LCCN: 64029805
- OCLC no.: 472455801

Links
- Journal homepage

Marxism Today, published between 1957 and 1991, was the theoretical magazine of the Communist Party of Great Britain. The magazine was headquartered in London. It was particularly important during the 1980s under the editorship of Martin Jacques. Through Marxism Today, Jacques is sometimes credited with coining the term "Thatcherism", and believed they were deconstructing the ideology of the government of the-then Prime Minister of the United Kingdom, Margaret Thatcher, through their theory of New Times. It was also a venue for the influential British cultural studies of Stuart Hall.

It was the standard-bearer for the reformist wing of the CPGB in the years 1977–1991. A special issue was published in 1998, seven years after the magazine's demise. Until 1998, the New Statesman described itself on an inside page as incorporating Marxism Today, among other titles.

== See also ==
- British left
