= Institute of Race Relations =

Think tank based in the United Kingdom

- Abbreviation: IRR
- Formation: 1958; 68 years ago
- Type: Research institute, think tank
- Location: London, United Kingdom
- Chair: John Narayan
- Main organ: Council of Management
- Website: http://www.irr.org.uk

The Institute of Race Relations (IRR) is a think tank based in the United Kingdom. It was formed in 1958 in order to publish research on race relations worldwide, and in 1972 was transformed into an "anti-racist think tank".

Proposed by Sunday Times editor Harry Hodson, the institute began as the Race Relations Unit of the Royal Institute of International Affairs in 1952. Former Governor of the United Provinces Lord Hailey served as first chairman, while Philip Mason, formerly of the Indian Civil Service, served as its first director. The unit later became the Institute of Race Relations under the chairmanship of Sir Alexander Carr-Saunders. Mason remained as director.

The IRR's objectives as an educational charity are to promote, encourage and support the study and understanding of, and exchange information about, relations between different races and peoples and the conditions in which they live and work; to consider and advise on proposals and endeavours to improve race relations and these conditions; and to promote knowledge on questions related to race relations.

== Early history ==
The founding of the IRR can be traced back to a 1950 Chatham House speech by Sunday Times editor Harry Hodson, "Race Relations in the Commonwealth", in which he described Communism and race relations as the two transcendent problems. During its early life, the IRR was influenced in its work and funding by national strategic concerns about the future of Britain's ex-colonies. Conferences were jointly organised with the Institute for Strategic Studies, and the Ford Foundation funded comparative policy-oriented research on the Caribbean, Latin America and Asia. Members of the Africa Private Enterprise Group (which included Rio Tinto, Barclays, Unilever et al.) helped to fund IRR research into tropical Africa.

In 1958, in response to "race riots" in Nottingham and Notting Hill, IRR produced the first study of domestic race relations, Colour in Britain by James Wickendon. In 1963, the Nuffield Foundation funded a five-year survey of British race relations, which commissioned 41 pieces of research, and published its findings as Colour and Citizenship by Jim Rose. Philip Mason, who had served as IRR director from 1952, retired in 1970 and was replaced by Professor Hugh Tinker. The IRR, centrally located in Jermyn Street in London’s West End, had more than 30 staff, a full book publishing programme, a library and information service and domestic and international research units.

== Transformation ==
By the end of the 1960s and the beginning of the 1970s, a period in which governments had begun to introduce restrictive immigration laws and politician Enoch Powell had made a series of emotive speeches on the subject of racial conflict, the staff and a section of the membership of the IRR began to question the type of research being undertaken at IRR, whether the organisation was in fact as impartial as it claimed to be and if working so closely with politicians and the government could benefit the victims of racism. This brought the staff and ultimately the membership into confrontation with the IRR’s Council. Robin Jenkins, an IRR researcher, criticised the methodology behind Colour and Citizenship, which he described as spying on black people. The Council, which was composed of chief executives from many leading multinational corporations, politicians from the House of Commons and House of Lords, newspaper editors and leading academics, tried to have him sacked and to close down the monthly magazine Race Today, which was accused of bias. But at an extraordinary general meeting of members in April 1972 the Council was outvoted and resigned en masse.

After the change of direction of IRR, neither the corporate sector nor the large foundations were willing to support IRR's work, and the organisation faced a funding crisis. It moved from the West End to a disused warehouse on Pentonville Road, London, N1, where a tiny staff augmented by volunteers continued to run all its services. New sources of funding were found in the World Council of Churches' Programme to Combat Racism, the Methodist Church, the Transnational Institute and local authorities, including the Greater London Council. As a result of a fund-raising drive, the IRR was able in 1984 to purchase an office building in Leeke Street, London Borough of Camden, which has been its home ever since.

Colin Prescod joined the IRR in 1976, becoming its chair in 1980. He served in this role until 2023 when he was replaced by John Narayan.

== Work programmes ==
=== Race & Class ===
Race & Class – a journal on racism, empire and globalisation – continues to be published quarterly by the IRR through Sage Publications. Those who have served on its Editorial Board include Eqbal Ahmad, John Berger, Victoria Brittain, Malcolm Caldwell, Jan Carew, Basil Davidson, Thomas Lionel Hodgkin, Orlando Letelier, Manning Marable, Colin Prescod, Cedric Robinson, Edward Said and Chris Searle.

=== Pamphlets and reports ===
The IRR since its transformation carries out small-scale ad hoc pieces of research on pressing aspects of racism, the results of which have been published as pamphlets and reports. In 1979, the IRR produced Police Against Black People, evidence to the Royal Commission on Criminal Procedure which detailed the police's inability to see black people as part of the community whose consent was needed for policing. This was updated as Policing Against Black People in 1987. Themes of institutional racism were dealt with in the pamphlets Race, Class and the State (1976) and From Immigration Control to Induced Repatriation (1978). Other reports have looked at racism and the press, black deaths in custody, school exclusions, the deaths of migrants, and asylum seekers. More recently, Spooked! How not to prevent violent extremism (2009) examined the government’s counter-terrorism programme; and Integration, Islamophobia and Civil Rights in Europe were published in 2008.

=== Black history ===
Since the 1980s, the IRR has been particularly concerned with promoting the study of black and anti-racist history – especially to inform the education of young people. To this end, it has produced a series of Race & Class pamphlets on the experiences of black communities in the UK: From resistance to rebellion (1982), Southall: the birth of a black community (1981) and Newham: the forging of a black community (1991). Other pamphlets explore the intersection of race and labor, feminism, and other social issues. Illustrated pamphlets, Roots of Racism, Patterns of Racism and How Racism Came to Britain, are still widely used in education, as are the multimedia CD-Rom Homebeats: struggles for racial justice (1997) and the DVD Struggles for Black Community (four film documentaries on the history of Ladbroke Grove, Southall, Cardiff and Leicester originally made by Race & Class Ltd [a sister company of IRR] for Channel 4 TV in 1982). A Black History Collection of pamphlets, journals and ephemera relating to black settlement and struggles from the 1950s to the 1980s is available for consultation by appointment at IRR.

=== European Race Audit ===
Since the 1990s, a major part of the IRR's work has been the analysis of racism in Europe. In 1992, the IRR set up the European Race Audit, to trace emerging patterns of racism in Europe, including the growth of far-right parties and anti-immigration movements, government policies on immigration and race, policing and racial violence. The European Race Bulletin was produced as a print magazine until the end of 2009, when it was replaced by online briefing papers and downloadable reports. These have highlighted human rights abuses at the borders of Europe, the emergence of xeno-racism, the increase in deportations, the rise of Islamophobia and the challenge to multiculturalism. From 2008 to 2010, the IRR carried out a project on Alternative Voices on Integration in a number of European countries.

=== IRR News ===
At the core of IRR's work is IRR News, a daily-updated free news service giving information about the impact of racism and experience of refugees in the UK. The news service, which is a key source of national information, carries news stories, features, reviews and events listings by IRR staff, volunteers and contributors, and has links to external sources (media and official reports).

== Management ==
As of 2011:

- Director: A. Sivanandan
- Executive director: Liz Fekete
- Chair: Colin Prescod
- Vice-chair: Frances Webber

Other members of IRR's Council of management: Naima Bouteldja, Lee Bridges, Victoria Brittain, Tony Bunyan, David Edgar, Paul Grant, Gholam Khiabany, Herman Ouseley, Naina Patel, Fizza Qureshi, Danny Reilly, Cilius Victor.

== See also ==
- Race & Class
- Ambalavaner Sivanandan
