= Anti-fascism =

Opposition to fascism

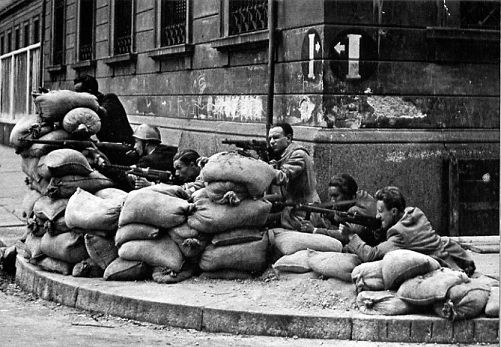
Italian partisans in Milan during the final insurrection leading to the liberation of Italy in April 1945

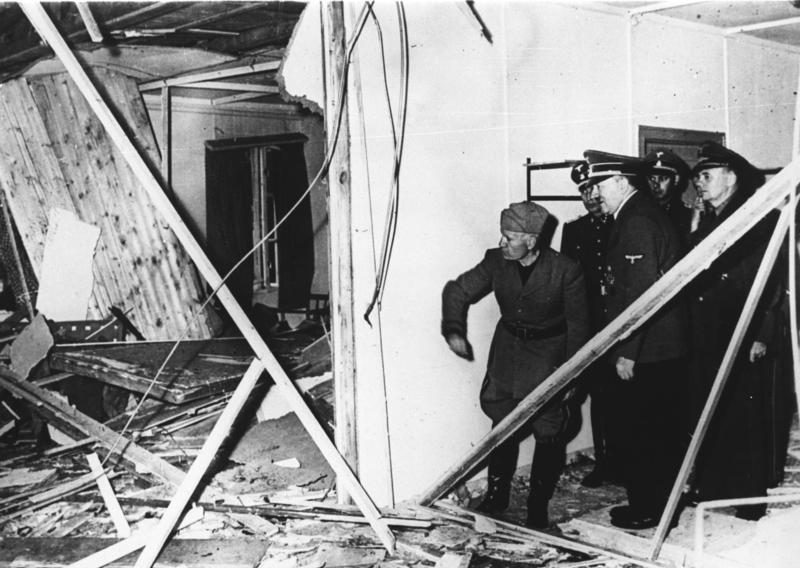
Hitler with Mussolini at the site of the 20 July Plot, an attempted bombing assassination of Hitler by dissident German military officers that took place in 1944

Anti-fascism is a political movement in opposition to fascist ideologies, groups, and individuals. Beginning in European countries in the 1920s, it was at its most significant shortly before and during World War II, where the Axis powers were opposed by many countries forming the Allies of World War II and dozens of resistance movements worldwide. Anti-fascism has been an element of movements across the political spectrum and holding many different political positions such as anarchism, communism, pacifism, republicanism, social democracy, socialism, and syndicalism as well as centrist, conservative, liberal, and nationalist viewpoints.

Before World War II, the West had not taken seriously the threat of fascism, and anti-fascism was sometimes associated with communism. However, the outbreak of World War II greatly changed Western perceptions, and fascism was seen as an existential threat by not only the Soviet Union but also by the liberal-democratic United States and United Kingdom. The Axis Powers of World War II were generally fascist, and the fight against them was characterized in anti-fascist terms. Resistance during World War II to fascism occurred in every occupied country, and came from across the ideological spectrum. The defeat of the Axis powers generally ended fascism as a state ideology.

After World War II, the anti-fascist movement continued to be active in places where organized fascism continued or re-emerged. There was a resurgence of antifa in Germany in the 1980s, as a response to the invasion of the punk scene by neo-Nazis. This influenced the antifa movement in the United States in the late 1980s and 1990s, which was similarly carried by punks. In the 21st century, this greatly increased in prominence as a response to the resurgence of the radical right, especially after the 2016 and 2024 elections of Donald Trump.

== Origins ==
Modern fasces symbol

A fasces (/ˈfæsiːz/ FASS-eez; Latin: [ˈfaskeːs]; a plurale tantum, from the Latin word fascis, meaning 'bundle'; Italian: fascio littorio) is a bound bundle of wooden rods, often but not always including an axe (occasionally two axes) with its blade emerging. The fasces is an Italian symbol that had its origin in the Etruscan civilization and was passed on to ancient Rome, where it symbolized a Roman king's power to punish his subjects, and later, a magistrate's power and jurisdiction. They were carried in a procession with a magistrate by lictors, who carried the fasces and at times used the birch rods as punishment to enforce obedience with magisterial commands. In common language and literature, the fasces were regularly associated with certain offices: praetors who were referred to in Greek as the hexapelekys (lit. 'six axes') and the consuls who were referred to as "the twelve fasces" as literary metonymy. Beyond serving as insignia of office, it also symbolised the Roman Republic and its prestige.

After the classical period, with the fall of the Roman state, thinkers were removed from the "psychological terror generated by the original Roman fasces" in the antique period. By the Renaissance, there emerged a conflation of the fasces with a Greek fable first recorded by Babrius in the second century AD depicting how individual sticks can be easily broken but how a bundle could not be. This story is common across Eurasian culture and by the thirteenth century AD was recorded in the Secret History of the Mongols. While there is no historical connection between the original fasces and this fable, by the sixteenth century AD, fasces were "inextricably linked" with interpretations of the fable as one expressing unity and harmony. Italian Fascism, which derives its name from the fasces, arguably used this symbolism the most in the 20th century.

With the development and spread of Italian Fascism, i.e. the original fascism, the National Fascist Party's ideology was met with increasingly militant opposition by Italian communists and socialists. Organizations such as Arditi del Popolo and the Italian Anarchist Union emerged between 1919 and 1921, to combat the nationalist and fascist surge of the post-World War I period.

In the words of historian Eric Hobsbawm, as fascism developed and spread, a "nationalism of the left" developed in those nations threatened by Italian irredentism (e.g. in the Balkans, and Albania in particular). After the outbreak of World War II, the Albanian and Yugoslav resistances were instrumental in antifascist action and underground resistance. This combination of irreconcilable nationalisms and leftist partisans constitute the earliest roots of European anti-fascism. Less militant forms of anti-fascism arose later. During the 1930s in Britain, "Christians – especially the Church of England – provided both a language of opposition to fascism and inspired anti-fascist action". French philosopher Georges Bataille believed that Friedrich Nietzsche was a forerunner of anti-fascism due to his derision for nationalism and racism.

Michael Seidman argues that traditionally anti-fascism was seen as the purview of the political left but that in recent years this has been questioned. Seidman identifies two types of anti-fascism, namely revolutionary and counterrevolutionary:

- Revolutionary anti-fascism was expressed amongst communists and anarchists, where it identified fascism and capitalism as its enemies and made little distinction between fascism and other forms of right-wing authoritarianism. It did not disappear after the Second World War but was used as an official ideology of the Soviet bloc, with the "fascist" West as the new enemy.
- Counterrevolutionary anti-fascism was much more conservative in nature, with Seidman arguing that Charles de Gaulle and Winston Churchill represented examples of it and that they tried to win the masses to their cause. Counterrevolutionary antifascists desired to ensure the restoration or continuation of the prewar old regime and conservative antifascists disliked fascism's erasure of the distinction between the public and private spheres. Like its revolutionary counterpart, it would outlast fascism once the Second World War ended.

Seidman argues that despite the differences between these two strands of anti-fascism, there were similarities. They would both come to regard violent expansion as intrinsic to the fascist project. They both rejected any claim that the Versailles Treaty was responsible for the rise of Nazism and instead viewed fascist dynamism as the cause of conflict. Unlike fascism, these two types of anti-fascism did not promise a quick victory but an extended struggle against a powerful enemy. During World War II, both anti-fascisms responded to fascist aggression by creating a cult of heroism which relegated victims to a secondary position. However, after the war, conflict arose between the revolutionary and counterrevolutionary anti-fascisms; the victory of the Western Allies allowed them to restore the old regimes of liberal democracy in Western Europe, while Soviet victory in Eastern Europe allowed for the establishment of new revolutionary anti-fascist regimes there. Some anti-fascist groups justify political violence as a reaction to violence by their opponents, though this has been show to be very rare. In some cases anti-fascism has been used to justify political repression.

=== Liberal and conservative anti-fascism ===
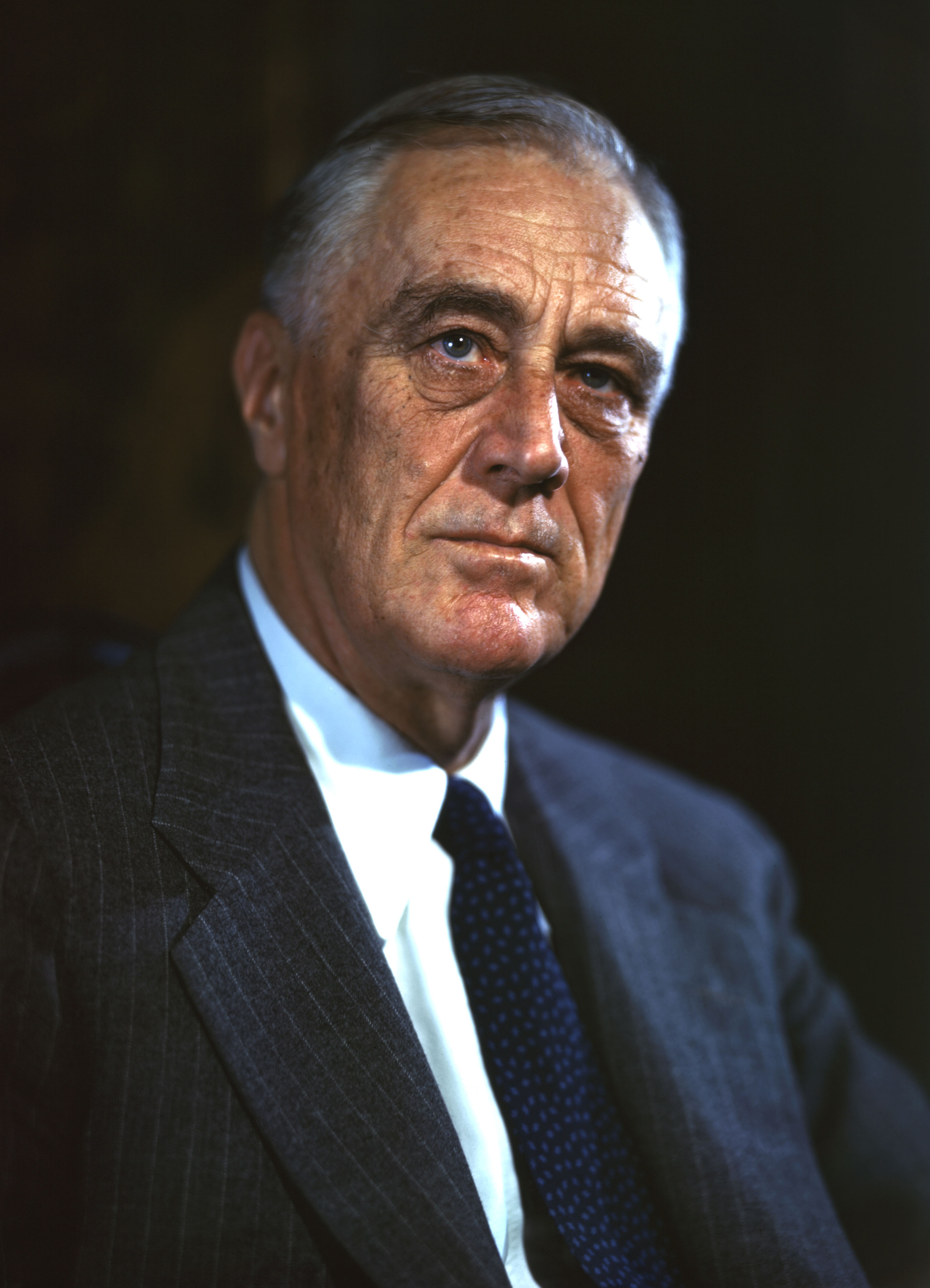
Franklin D. Roosevelt

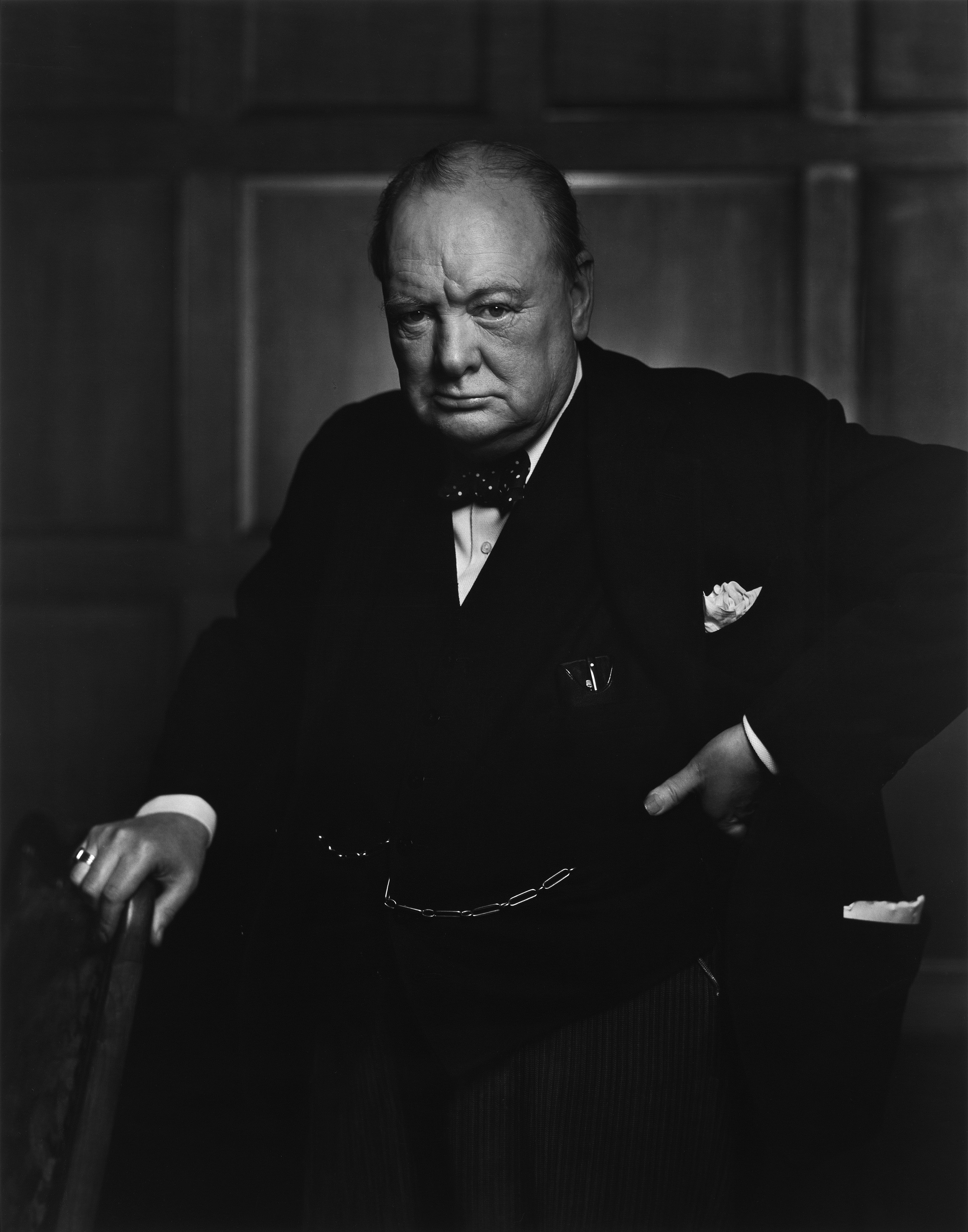
Winston Churchill

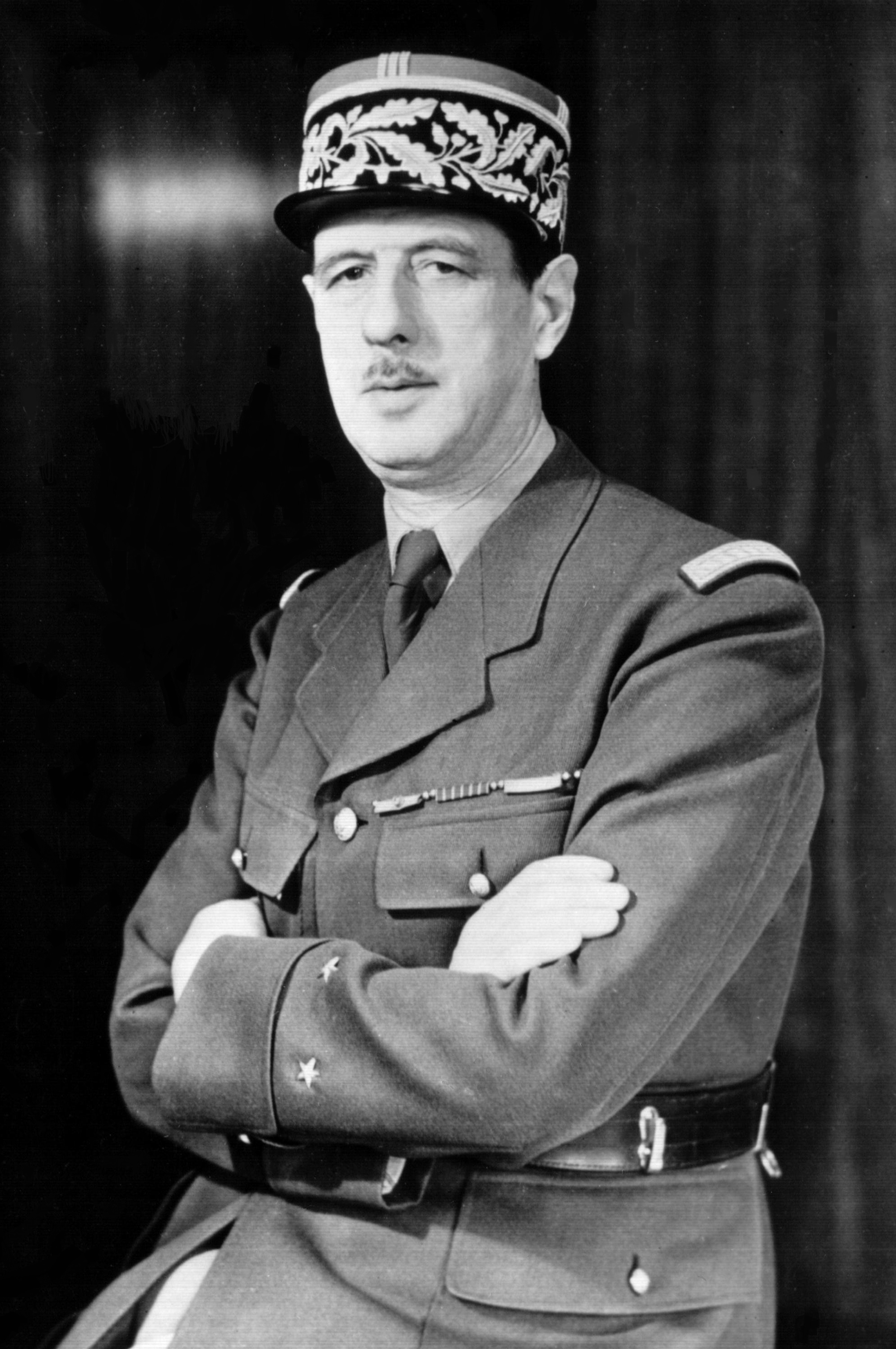
Charles de Gaulle

Liberal and conservative anti-fascism refers to opposition to fascism grounded in the defense of constitutional order and national stability, focused on preserving liberal democracy against the fascist threat, rather than the radical social transformations demanded by revolutionary anti-fascists.

This form of anti-fascism is often associated with prominent figures such as Franklin D. Roosevelt, Winston Churchill and Charles de Gaulle, who opposed fascist authoritarianism while also resisting the revolutionary left. It was supported by a broad coalition of groups, including capitalists, trade unionists, social democrats, reformist socialists, and moderate conservatives, all of whom united in their opposition to fascism and their support for political stability.

Counterrevolutionary anti-fascism sought to challenge fascist ideologies and movements, aiming to preserve existing democratic structures and stabilize society. It focused on reinforcing confidence in democratic governance and addressing extremist movements, setting itself apart from revolutionary anti-fascism, which frequently aimed at challenging capitalist systems.

In Great Britain, conservative anti-fascists primarily concentrated on maintaining the Westminster system of parliamentary rule, marginalizing fascist groups through legal and institutional means such as the Public Order Act 1936, which cracked down on the British Union of Fascists. Anti-fascists in the Labour Party and Liberal Party, on the other hand, opposed fascists actively through media campaigns, petitions, parliamentary debates, and public discourse. Both forms recognized fascism as a threat to the constitution, and both approached revolutionary ideologies, including communism, with caution. British counterrevolutionary anti-fascism in the 1930s was shaped by an alliance that transcended traditional political divisions. Churchill's leadership was pivotal in creating an antifascist front that included both conservative and social democratic figures. This coalition rejected the pretense that fascism was the only defense against communism, instead defending the constitution of the United Kingdom. Through organizations like the Anti-Nazi Council, the counterrevolutionary antifascist movement rallied elites across the political spectrum, including trade unionists and churchmen, to oppose fascism and preserve liberal democracy. This broader vision of anti-fascism, sepearate from socialist and communist approaches, helped shape Britain's resistance to Nazi aggression.

French conservative anti-fascism, particularly in the years leading up to and during World War II, was characterized by opposition to both Italian Fascism and German Nazism. Figures such as Benjamin Crémieux, a Jewish intellectual, criticized Mussolini's anti-parliamentarianism and the Fascist regime's abolition of Italian democracy, expressing concern about a potential alignment between Italian Fascism and far-right movements in France. Meanwhile, journals like L'Europe Nouvelle and individuals such as Georges Bernanos and Charles de Gaulle opposed the policy of appeasement, emphasizing the danger of capitulation to totalitarian regimes. They also critiqued the French right's minimization of the threats posed by Hitler and Mussolini and advocated for an active anti-fascist stance, which, in some cases, included support for temporary alliances with the Soviet Union despite differing views on Communism. This conservative or counterrevolutionary anti-fascism was influenced by concerns over national sovereignty, democracy, and resistance to totalitarian movements.

In the United States, a coalition of liberals and conservatives, particularly under President Franklin D. Roosevelt, opposed fascism through both political and military means, with an emphasis on preserving democratic institutions in the face of growing fascist threats. American liberal anti-fascism emerged as a response to the increasing spread of fascism in Europe and the potential for its expansion into the Western Hemisphere. Initially, Roosevelt navigated a delicate balance, adopting limited measures to avoid alienating isolationist sentiment while preparing for the possibility of war. As Germany's expansion progressed, Roosevelt shifted towards providing more active support for Britain and its allies, eventually securing public and political backing for military aid. Despite opposition from isolationists and anti-interventionists, Roosevelt's administration, supported by business and labor leaders, increasingly aligned with anti-fascist forces. This shift in American foreign policy reinforced the country's focus on countering Nazi Germany, reducing the influence of isolationists, and establishing an anti-fascist position. Examples of anti-fascist propaganda in the United States are the films Hitler's Reign of Terror (1934), often credited as being the "first-ever American anti-Nazi film," and Don't Be a Sucker (1943).

== History ==
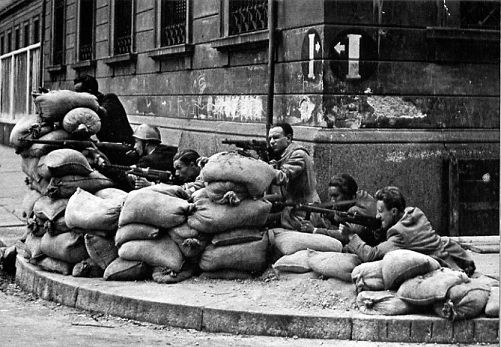
Italian partisans in Milan during the final insurrection leading to the liberation of Italy in April 1945

Anti-fascist movements emerged first in Italy during the rise of Benito Mussolini, but they soon spread to other European countries and then globally. In the early period, Communist, socialist, anarchist and Christian-democratic organisers and intellectuals were involved. Until 1928, the period of the United front, there was significant collaboration between the Communists and non-Communist anti-fascists.

In 1928, the Comintern instituted its ultra-left Third Period policies, ending co-operation with other left groups, and denouncing social democrats as "social fascists". From 1934 until the Molotov–Ribbentrop Pact, the Communists pursued a Popular Front approach, of building broad-based coalitions with liberal and even conservative anti-fascists. As fascism consolidated its power, and especially during World War II, anti-fascism largely took the form of partisan or resistance movements.

=== Italy: against Fascism and Mussolini ===
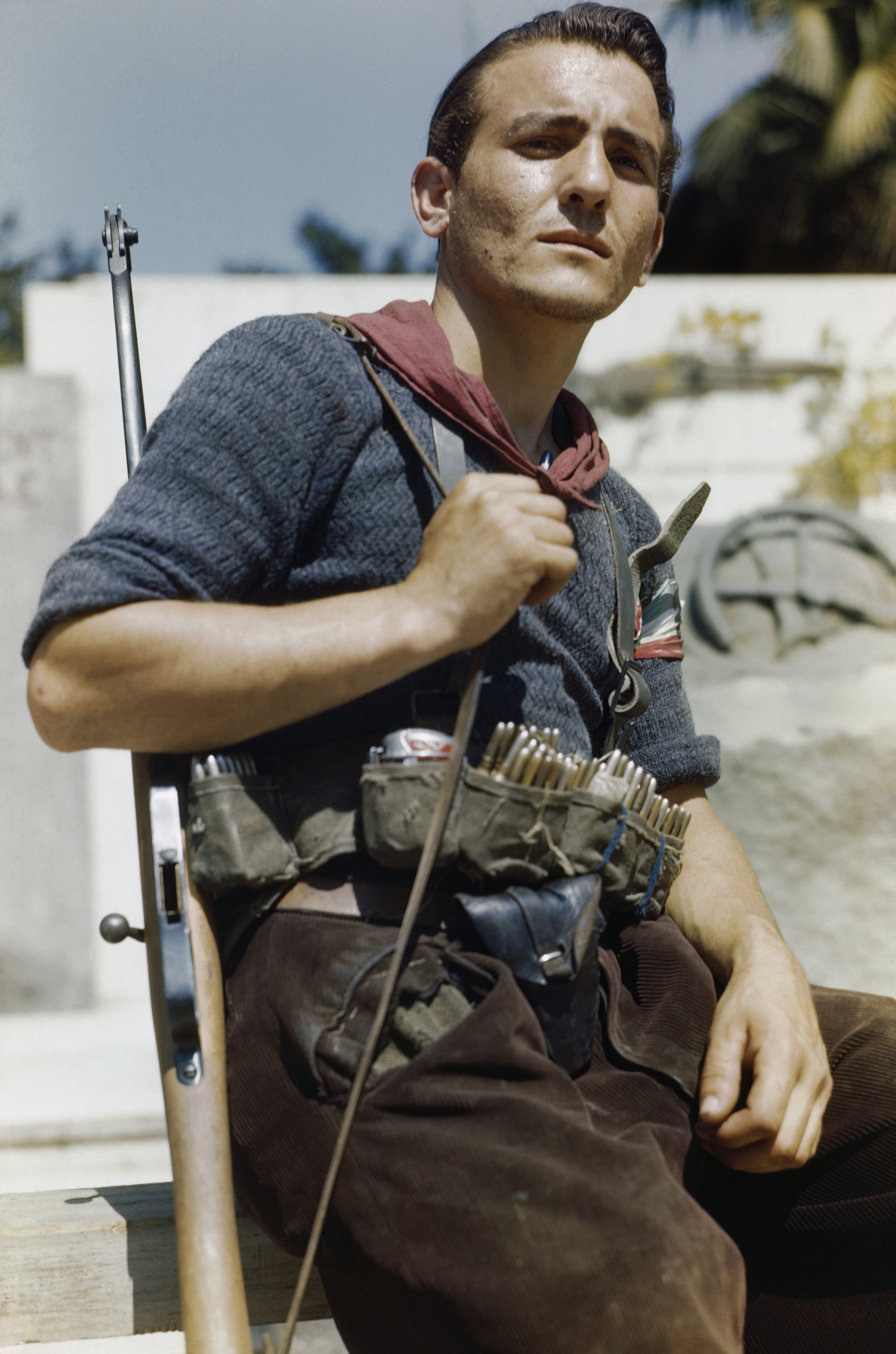
An Italian partisan in Florence, 14 August 1944, during the liberation of Italy

Flag of Arditi del Popolo, an axe cutting a fasces. Arditi del Popolo was a militant anti-fascist group founded in 1921 in Italy.

In Italy, Mussolini's Fascist regime used the term anti-fascist to describe its opponents. Mussolini's secret police was officially known as the Organization for Vigilance and Repression of Anti-Fascism. During the 1920s in the Kingdom of Italy, anti-fascists, many of them from the labor movement, fought against the violent Blackshirts and against the rise of the fascist leader Benito Mussolini. After the Italian Socialist Party (PSI) signed a pacification pact with Mussolini and his Fasces of Combat on 3 August 1921, and trade unions adopted a legalist and pacified strategy, members of the workers' movement who disagreed with this strategy formed Arditi del Popolo.

The Italian General Confederation of Labour (CGL) and the PSI refused to officially recognize the anti-fascist militia and maintained a non-violent, legalist strategy, while the Communist Party of Italy (PCd'I) ordered its members to quit the organization. The PCd'I organized some militant groups, but their actions were relatively minor. The Italian anarchist Severino Di Giovanni, who exiled himself to Argentina following the 1922 March on Rome, organized several bombings against the Italian fascist community. The Italian liberal anti-fascist Benedetto Croce wrote his Manifesto of the Anti-Fascist Intellectuals, which was published in 1925. Other notable Italian liberal anti-fascists around that time were Piero Gobetti and Carlo Rosselli.

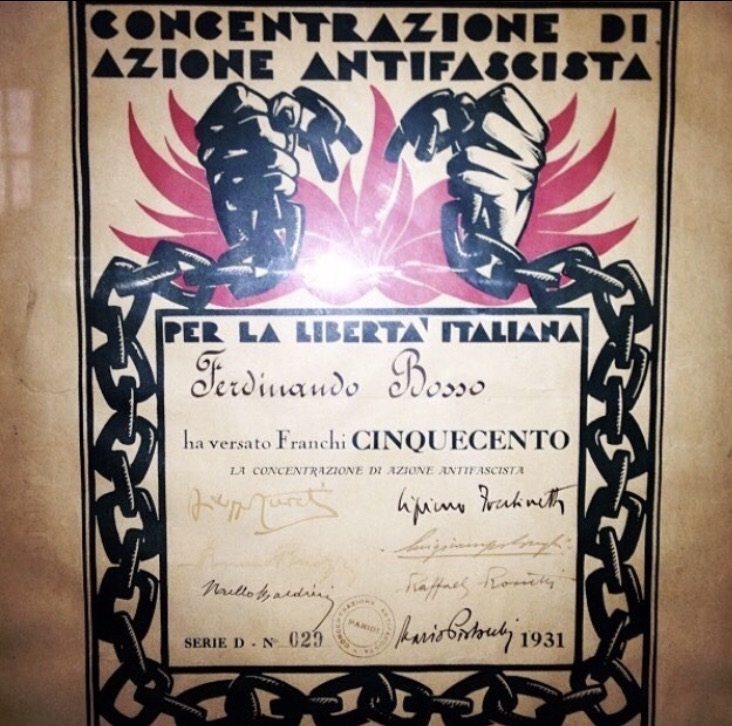
1931 badge of a member of Concentrazione Antifascista Italiana

Concentrazione Antifascista Italiana (English: Italian Anti-Fascist Concentration), officially known as Concentrazione d'Azione Antifascista (Anti-Fascist Action Concentration), was an Italian coalition of Anti-Fascist groups which existed from 1927 to 1934. Founded in Nérac, France, by expatriate Italians, the CAI was an alliance of non-communist anti-fascist forces (republican, socialist, nationalist) trying to promote and to coordinate expatriate actions to fight fascism in Italy; they published a propaganda paper entitled La Libertà.

Flag of Giustizia e Libertà, anti-fascist movement active from 1929 to 1945

Giustizia e Libertà (English: Justice and Freedom) was an Italian anti-fascist resistance movement, active from 1929 to 1945. The movement was cofounded by Carlo Rosselli, Ferruccio Parri, who later became Prime Minister of Italy, and Sandro Pertini, who became President of Italy, were among the movement's leaders. The movement's members held various political beliefs but shared a belief in active, effective opposition to fascism, compared to the older Italian anti-fascist parties. Giustizia e Libertà also made the international community aware of the realities of fascism in Italy, thanks to the work of Gaetano Salvemini.

Many Italian anti-fascists participated in the Spanish Civil War with the hope of setting an example of armed resistance to Franco's dictatorship against Mussolini's regime; hence their motto: "Today in Spain, tomorrow in Italy".

Between 1920 and 1943, several anti-fascist movements were active among the Slovenes and Croats in the territories annexed to Italy after World War I, known as the Julian March. The most influential was the militant insurgent organization TIGR, which carried out numerous sabotages, as well as attacks on representatives of the Fascist Party and the military. Most of the underground structure of the organization was discovered and dismantled by the Organization for Vigilance and Repression of Anti-Fascism (OVRA) in 1940 and 1941, and after June 1941 most of its former activists joined the Slovene Partisans.

During World War II, many members of the Italian resistance left their homes and went to live in the mountains, fighting against Italian fascists and German Nazi soldiers during the Italian Civil War. Many cities in Italy, including Turin, Naples and Milan, were freed by anti-fascist uprisings.

=== Slovenians and Croats under Italianization ===
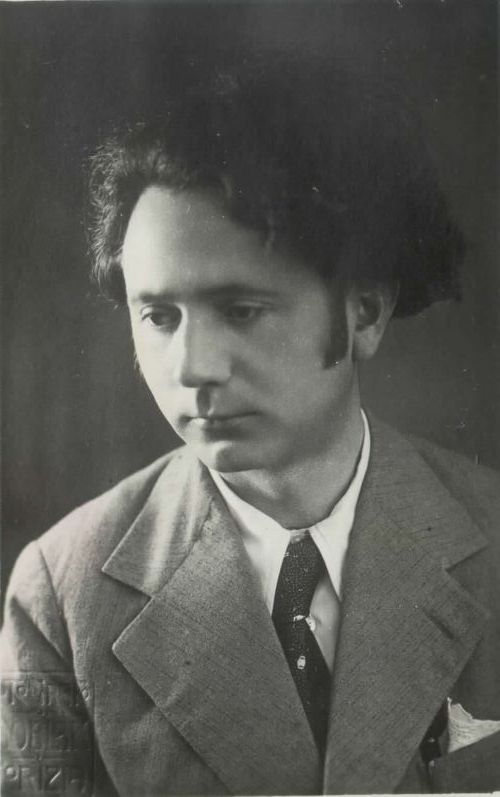
Lojze Bratuž, a Slovenian choirmaster and composer who was martyred by fascists for singing Christmas songs in Slovenian at mass with his choir

The anti-fascist resistance emerged within the Slovene minority in Italy (1920–1947), whom the Fascists meant to deprive of their culture, language and ethnicity. The 1920 burning of the National Hall in Trieste, the Slovene center in the multi-cultural and multi-ethnic Trieste by the Blackshirts, was praised by Benito Mussolini (yet to become Il Duce) as a "masterpiece of the Triestine fascism" (capolavoro del fascismo triestino). The use of Slovene in public places, including churches, was forbidden, not only in multi-ethnic areas, but also in the areas where the population was exclusively Slovene. Children, if they spoke Slovene, were punished by Italian teachers who were brought by the Fascist State from Southern Italy. Slovene teachers, writers, and clergy were sent to the other side of Italy.

The first anti-fascist organization, called TIGR, was formed by Slovenes and Croats in 1927 in order to fight Fascist violence. Its guerrilla fight continued into the late 1920s and 1930s. By the mid-1930s, 70,000 Slovenes had fled Italy, mostly to Slovenia (then part of Yugoslavia) and South America.

The Slovene anti-fascist resistance in Yugoslavia during World War II was led by Liberation Front of the Slovenian People. The Province of Ljubljana, occupied by Italian Fascists, saw the deportation of 25,000 people, representing 7.5% of the total population, filling up the Rab concentration camp and Gonars concentration camp as well as other Italian concentration camps.

=== Germany: against the NSDAP and Hitlerism ===
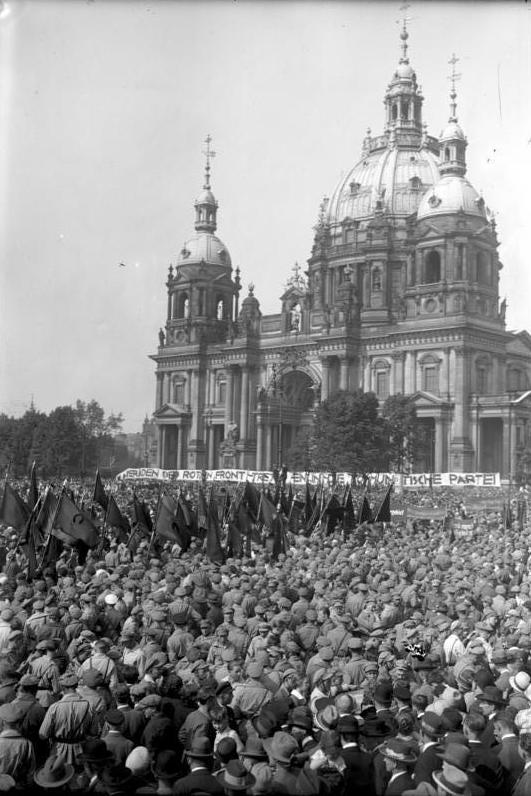
1928 Roter Frontkämpferbund rally in Berlin. Organized by the Communist Party of Germany, the RFB had at its height over 100,000 members.

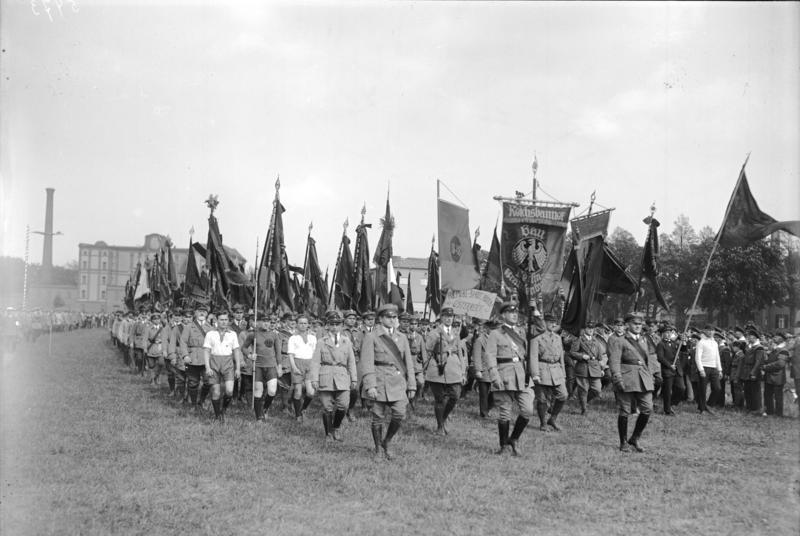
1928 Reichsbanner Schwarz-Rot-Gold rally

The specific term anti-fascism was primarily used by the Communist Party of Germany (KPD), which held the view that it was the only anti-fascist party in Germany. The KPD formed several explicitly anti-fascist groups such as Roter Frontkämpferbund (formed in 1924 and banned by the Social Democrats in 1929) and Kampfbund gegen den Faschismus (a de facto successor to the latter). At its height, Roter Frontkämpferbund had over 100,000 members. In 1932, the KPD established the Antifaschistische Aktion as a "red united front under the leadership of the only anti-fascist party, the KPD". Under the leadership of the committed Stalinist Ernst Thälmann, the KPD primarily viewed fascism as the final stage of capitalism rather than as a specific movement or group, and therefore applied the term broadly to its opponents, and in the name of anti-fascism the KPD focused in large part on attacking its main adversary, the centre-left Social Democratic Party of Germany, whom they referred to as social fascists and regarded as the "main pillar of the dictatorship of Capital."

The movement of Nazism, which grew ever more influential in the last years of the Weimar Republic, was opposed for different ideological reasons by a wide variety of groups, including groups which also opposed each other, such as social democrats, centrists, conservatives and communists. The SPD and centrists formed Reichsbanner Schwarz-Rot-Gold in 1924 to defend liberal democracy against both the Nazi Party and the KPD, and their affiliated organizations. Later, mainly SPD members formed the Iron Front which opposed the same groups.

The name and logo of Antifaschistische Aktion remain influential. Its two-flag logo, designed by Max Gebhard and Max Keilson, is still widely used as a symbol of militant anti-fascists in Germany and globally, as is the Iron Front's Three Arrows logo.

=== Spain: Civil War against the Nationalists ===
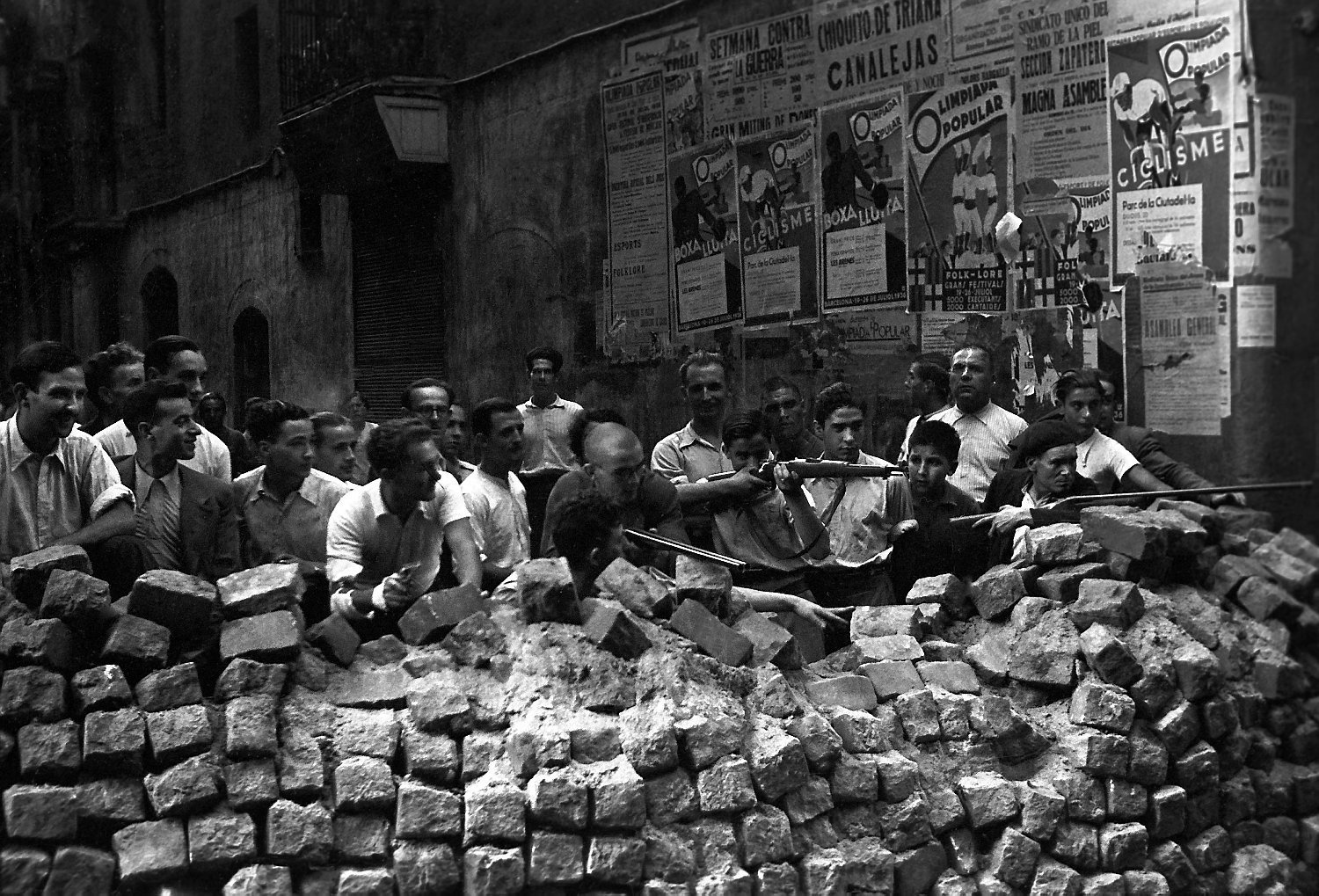
Anarchists in Barcelona. The civil war was fought between the anarchist territories and stateless lands that achieved workers' self-management, and capitalist areas of Spain controlled by the autocratic Nationalist faction.

The historian Eric Hobsbawm wrote: "The Spanish civil war was both at the centre and on the margin of the era of anti-fascism. It was central, since it was immediately seen as a European war between fascism and anti-fascism, almost as the first battle in the coming world war, some of the characteristic aspects of which – for example, air raids against civilian populations – it anticipated."

In Spain, there were histories of popular uprisings in the late 19th century through to the 1930s against the deep-seated military dictatorships of General Prim and Primo de Rivera. These movements further coalesced into large-scale anti-fascist movements in the 1930s, many in the Basque Country, before and during the Spanish Civil War. The republican government and army, the Antifascist Worker and Peasant Militias (MAOC) linked to the Communist Party (PCE), the International Brigades, the Workers' Party of Marxist Unification (POUM), Spanish anarchist militias, such as the Iron Column and the autonomous governments of Catalonia and the Basque Country, fought the rise of Francisco Franco with military force.

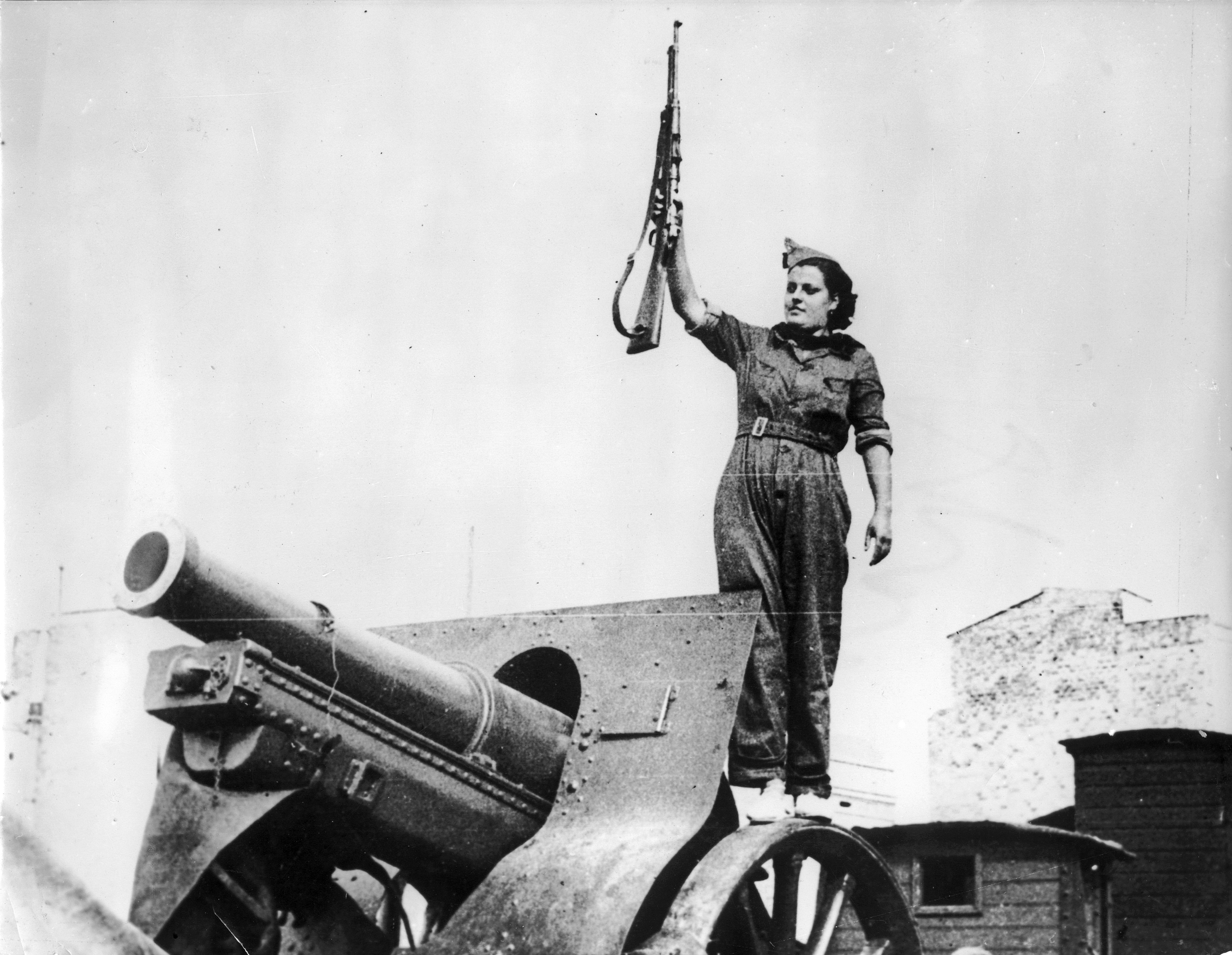
Woman with a rifle, soldier of Mujeres Libres, Confederal militias Barcelona, 1936 Spanish Civil War

The Friends of Durruti, associated with the Federación Anarquista Ibérica (FAI), were a particularly militant group. Thousands of people from many countries went to Spain in support of the anti-fascist cause, joining units such as the Abraham Lincoln Brigade, the British Battalion, the Dabrowski Battalion, the Mackenzie-Papineau Battalion, the Naftali Botwin Company and the Thälmann Battalion, including Winston Churchill's nephew, Esmond Romilly. Notable anti-fascists who worked internationally against Franco included: George Orwell (who fought in the POUM militia and wrote Homage to Catalonia about his experience), Ernest Hemingway (a supporter of the International Brigades who wrote For Whom the Bell Tolls about his experience), and the radical journalist Martha Gellhorn.

The Spanish anarchist guerrilla Francesc Sabaté Llopart fought against Franco's regime until the 1960s, from a base in France. The Spanish Maquis, linked to the PCE, also fought the Franco regime long after the Spanish Civil war had ended.

=== France: against Action Française and Vichy ===
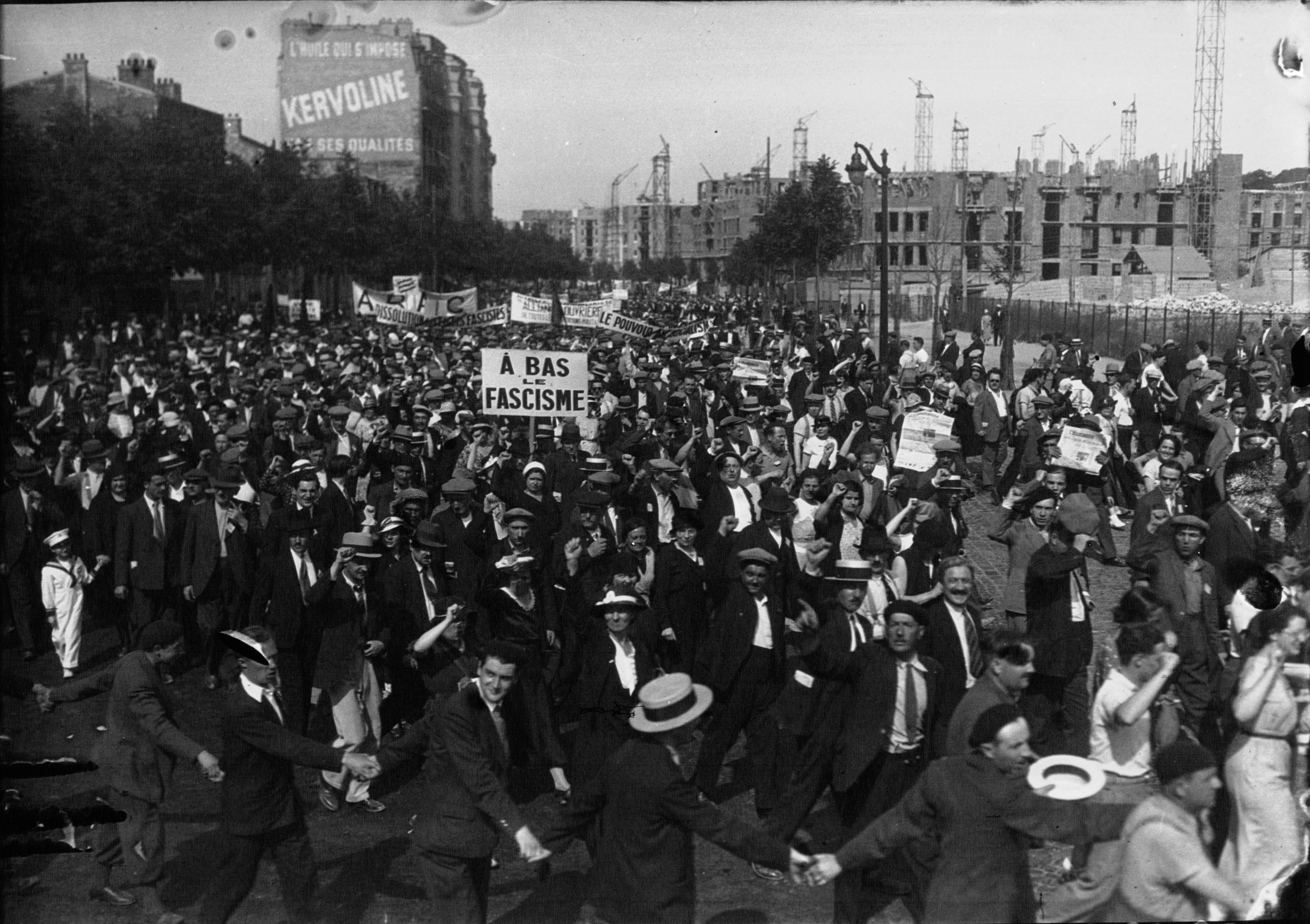
1934 demonstration in Paris, with a sign reading "Down with fascism"

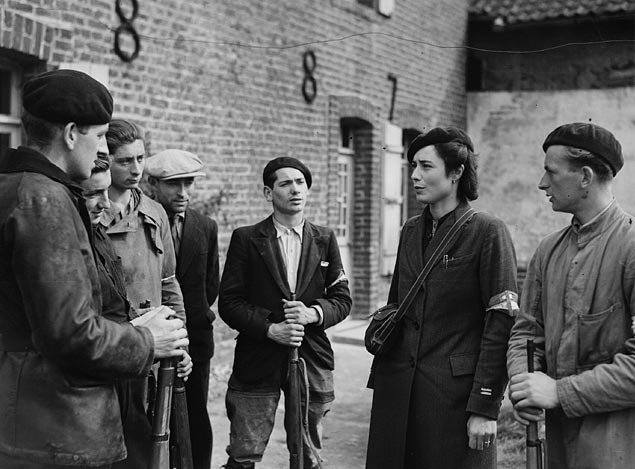
Maquis members in 1944

In the 1920s and 1930s in the French Third Republic, anti-fascists confronted aggressive far-right groups such as the Action Française movement in France, which dominated the Latin Quarter students' neighborhood. After fascism triumphed via invasion, the French Resistance (French: La Résistance française) or, more accurately, resistance movements fought against the Nazi German occupation and against the collaborationist Vichy régime. Resistance cells were small groups of armed men and women (called the maquis in rural areas), who, in addition to their guerrilla warfare activities, were also publishers of underground newspapers and magazines such as Arbeiter und Soldat (Worker and Soldier) during World War Two, providers of first-hand intelligence information, and maintainers of escape networks.

=== United Kingdom: against Mosley's BUF ===
The rise of Oswald Mosley's British Union of Fascists (BUF) in the 1930s was challenged by the Communist Party of Great Britain, socialists in the Labour Party and Independent Labour Party, anarchists, Irish Catholic dockmen and working class Jews in London's East End. A high point in the struggle was the Battle of Cable Street, when thousands of local residents and others turned out to stop the BUF from marching. Initially, the national Communist Party leadership wanted a mass demonstration at Hyde Park in solidarity with Republican Spain, instead of a mobilization against the BUF, but local party activists argued against this. Activists rallied support with the slogan They shall not pass, adopted from Republican Spain.

There were debates within the anti-fascist movement over tactics. While many East End ex-servicemen participated in violence against fascists, Communist Party leader Phil Piratin denounced these tactics and instead called for large demonstrations. In addition to the militant anti-fascist movement, there was a smaller current of liberal anti-fascism in Britain; Sir Ernest Barker, for example, was a notable English liberal anti-fascist in the 1930s.

=== United States, World War II ===
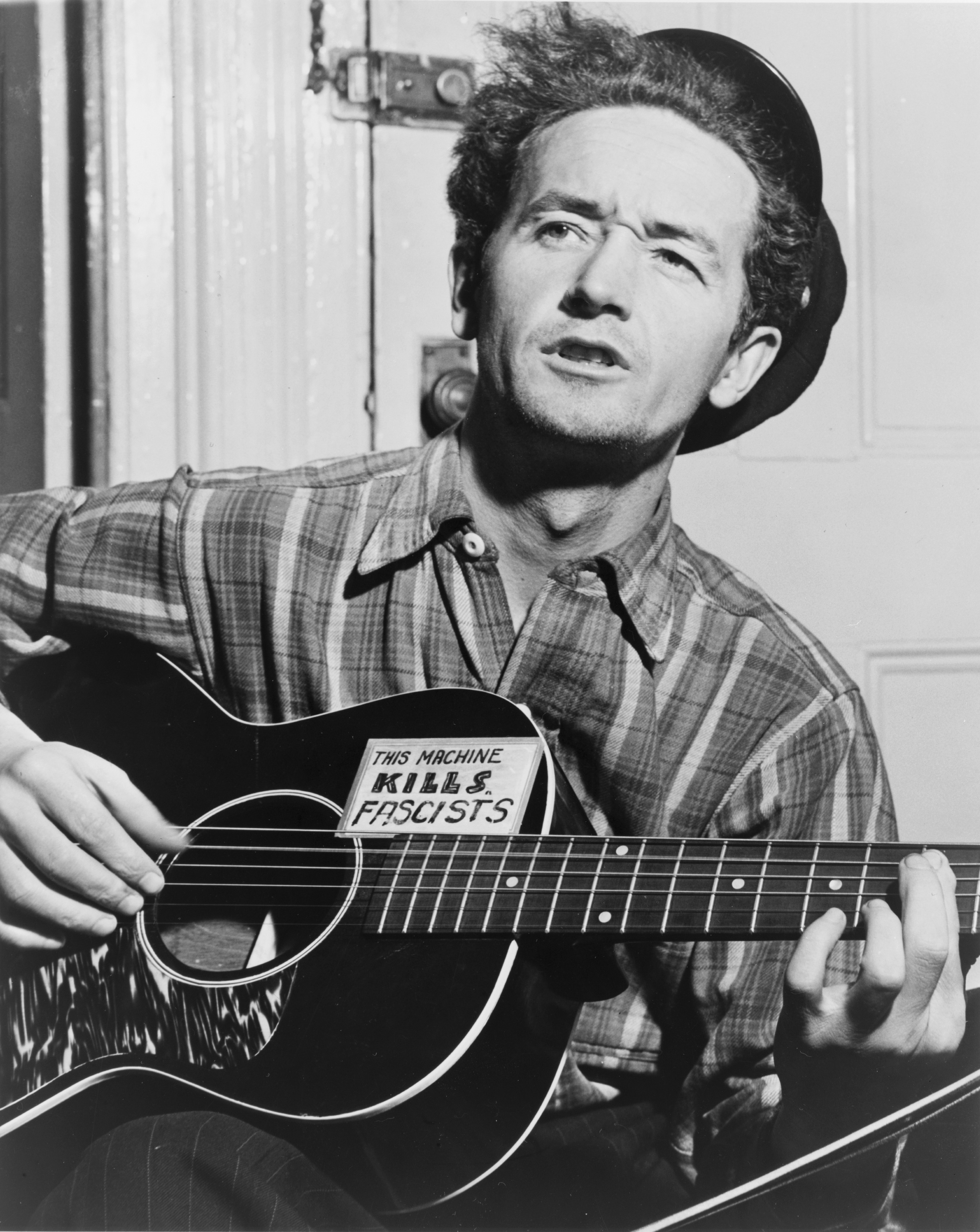
American singer-songwriter and anti-fascist Woody Guthrie and his guitar labelled "This machine kills fascists"

Anti-fascist Italian expatriates in the United States founded the Mazzini Society in Northampton, Massachusetts, in September 1939 to work toward ending Fascist rule in Italy. As political refugees from Mussolini's regime, they disagreed among themselves whether to ally with Communists and anarchists or to exclude them. The Mazzini Society joined with other anti-Fascist Italian expatriates in the Americas at a conference in Montevideo, Uruguay, in 1942. They unsuccessfully promoted one of their members, Carlo Sforza, to become the post-Fascist leader of a republican Italy. The Mazzini Society dispersed after the overthrow of Mussolini as most of its members returned to Italy.

During the Second Red Scare which occurred in the United States in the years that immediately followed the end of World War II, the term "premature anti-fascist" came into currency and it was used to describe Americans who had strongly agitated or worked against fascism, such as Americans who had fought for the Republicans during the Spanish Civil War, before fascism was seen as a proximate and existential threat to the United States (which only occurred generally after the invasion of Poland by Nazi Germany and only occurred universally after the attack on Pearl Harbor). The implication was that such persons were either Communists or Communist sympathizers whose loyalty to the United States was suspect. However, the historians John Earl Haynes and Harvey Klehr have written that no documentary evidence has been found of the US government referring to American members of the International Brigades as "premature antifascists": the Federal Bureau of Investigation, Office of Strategic Services, and United States Army records used terms such as "Communist", "Red", "subversive", and "radical" instead. Indeed, Haynes and Klehr indicate that they have found many examples of members of the XV International Brigade and their supporters referring to themselves sardonically as "premature antifascists". Peter N. Carroll, a historian of the Americans who served in the XV International Brigade, challenges their account, however, quoting contemporary descriptions of the term being used as a tool to challenge the loyalty of those veterans and minimize their sacrifice. He cites, for example, a speech in 1945 by Representative John M. Coffee at Madison Square Garden, where he mentions those veterans and says, "they call them premature anti-fascists in some nasty Washington circles today!"

=== Burma, World War II ===
The Anti-Fascist Organisation (AFO) was a resistance movement which advocated the independence of Burma and fought against the Japanese occupation of Burma during World War II. It was the forerunner of the Anti-Fascist People's Freedom League. The AFO was formed during a meeting which was held in Pegu in August 1944, the meeting was held by the leaders of the Communist Party of Burma (CPB), the Burma National Army (BNA) led by General Aung San, and the People's Revolutionary Party (PRP), later renamed the Burma Socialist Party. Whilst in Insein prison in July 1941, CPB leaders Thakin Than Tun and Thakin Soe had co-authored the Insein Manifesto, which, against the prevailing opinion in the Burmese nationalist movement led by the Dobama Asiayone, identified world fascism as the main enemy in the coming war and called for temporary cooperation with the British in a broad allied coalition that included the Soviet Union. Soe had already gone underground to organise resistance against the Japanese occupation, and Than Tun as Minister of Land and Agriculture was able to pass on Japanese intelligence to Soe, while other Communist leaders Thakin Thein Pe and Thakin Tin Shwe made contact with the exiled colonial government in Simla, India. Aung San was War Minister in the puppet administration which was set up on 1 August 1943 and included the Socialist leaders Thakin Nu and Thakin Mya. During a meeting which was held between 1 and 3 March 1945, the AFO was reorganized as a multi-party front which was named the Anti-Fascist People's Freedom League.

=== Poland, World War II ===
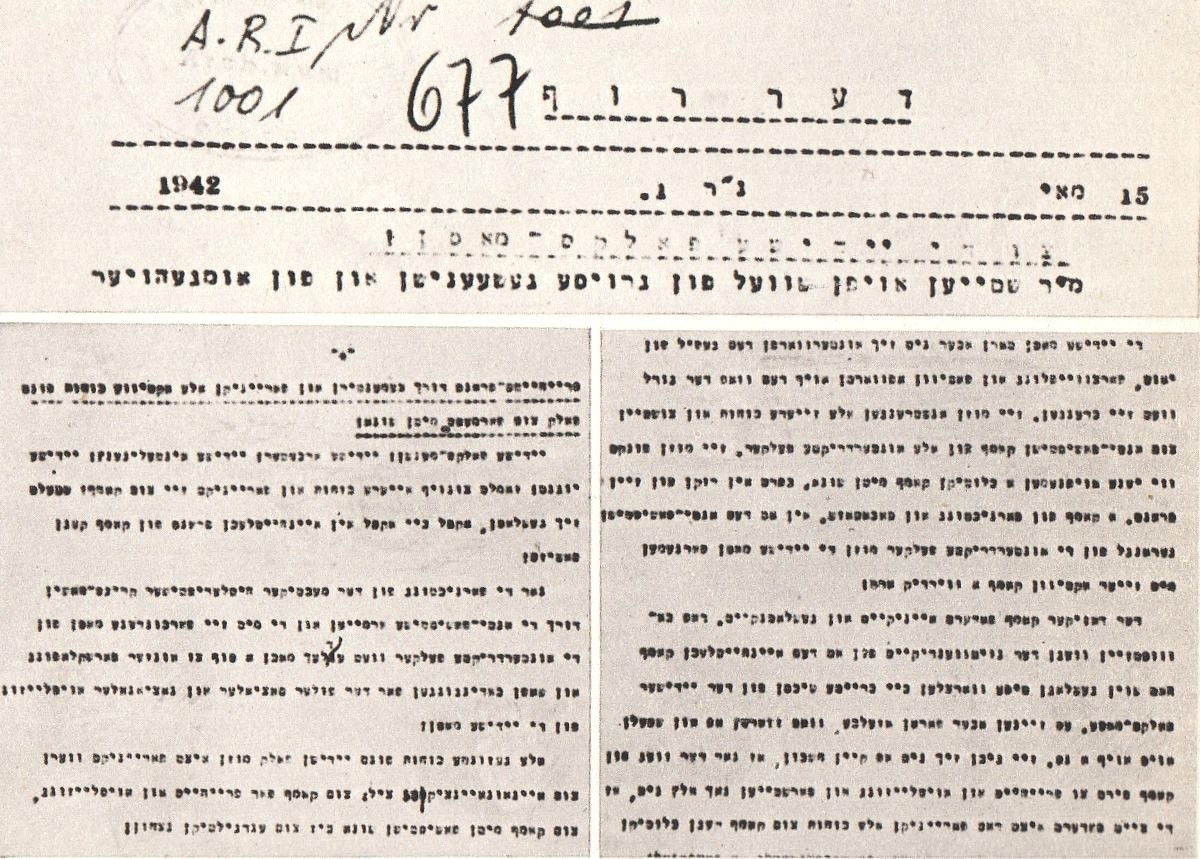
Proclamation of the Anti-Fascist Bloc, 15 May 1942

The Anti-Fascist Bloc was an organization of Polish Jews formed in the March 1942 in the Warsaw Ghetto. It was created after an alliance between leftist-Zionist, communist and socialist Jewish parties was agreed upon. The initiators of the bloc were Mordechai Anielewicz, Józef Lewartowski (Aron Finkelstein) from the Polish Workers' Party, Josef Kaplan from Hashomer Hatzair, Szachno Sagan from Poale Zion-Left, Jozef Sak as a representative of socialist-Zionists and Izaak Cukierman with his wife Cywia Lubetkin from Dror. The Jewish Bund did not join the bloc though they were represented at its first conference by Abraham Blum and Maurycy Orzech.

=== After World War II ===
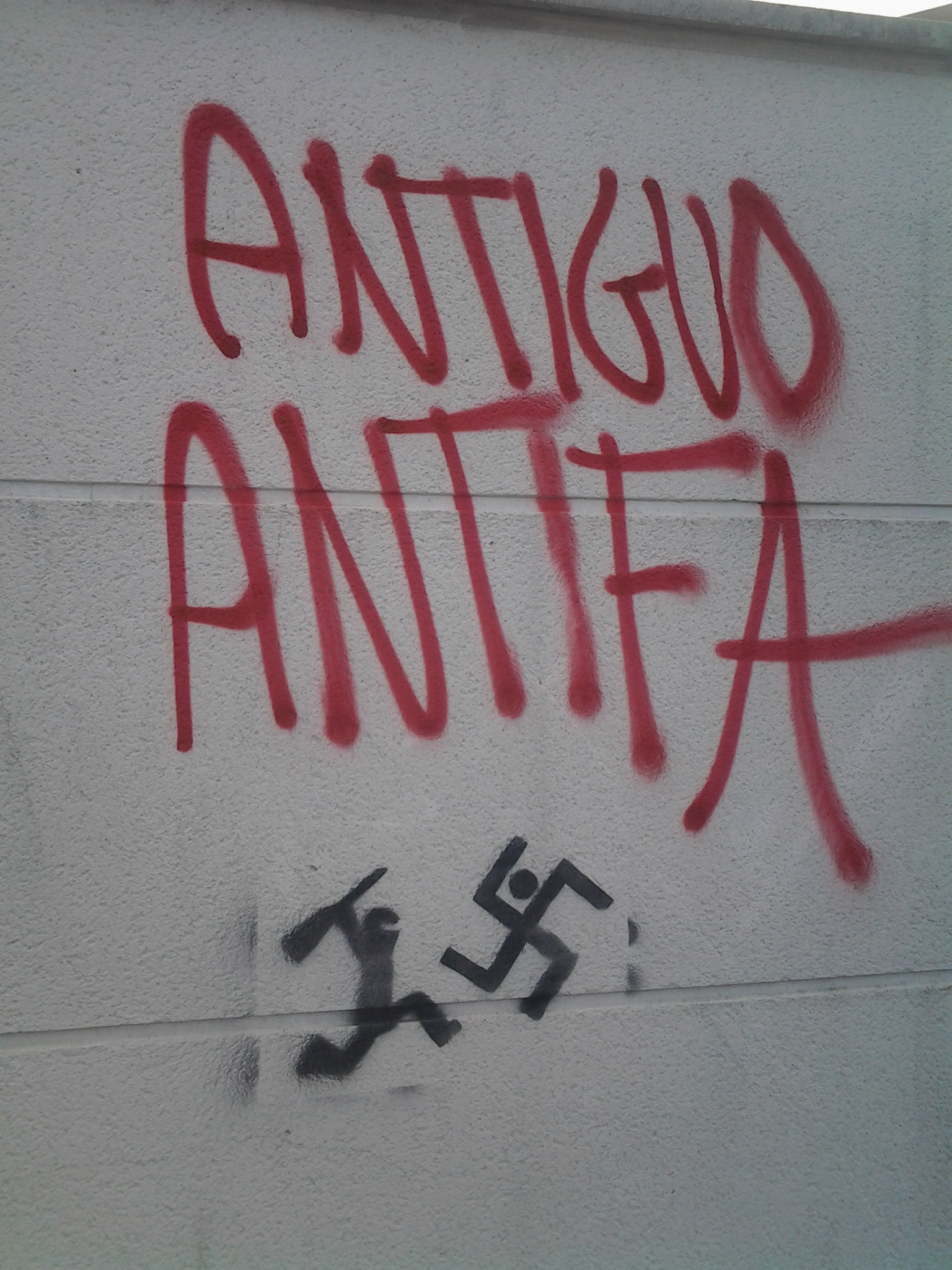
Anti-fascist graffiti in San Sebastián, Spain

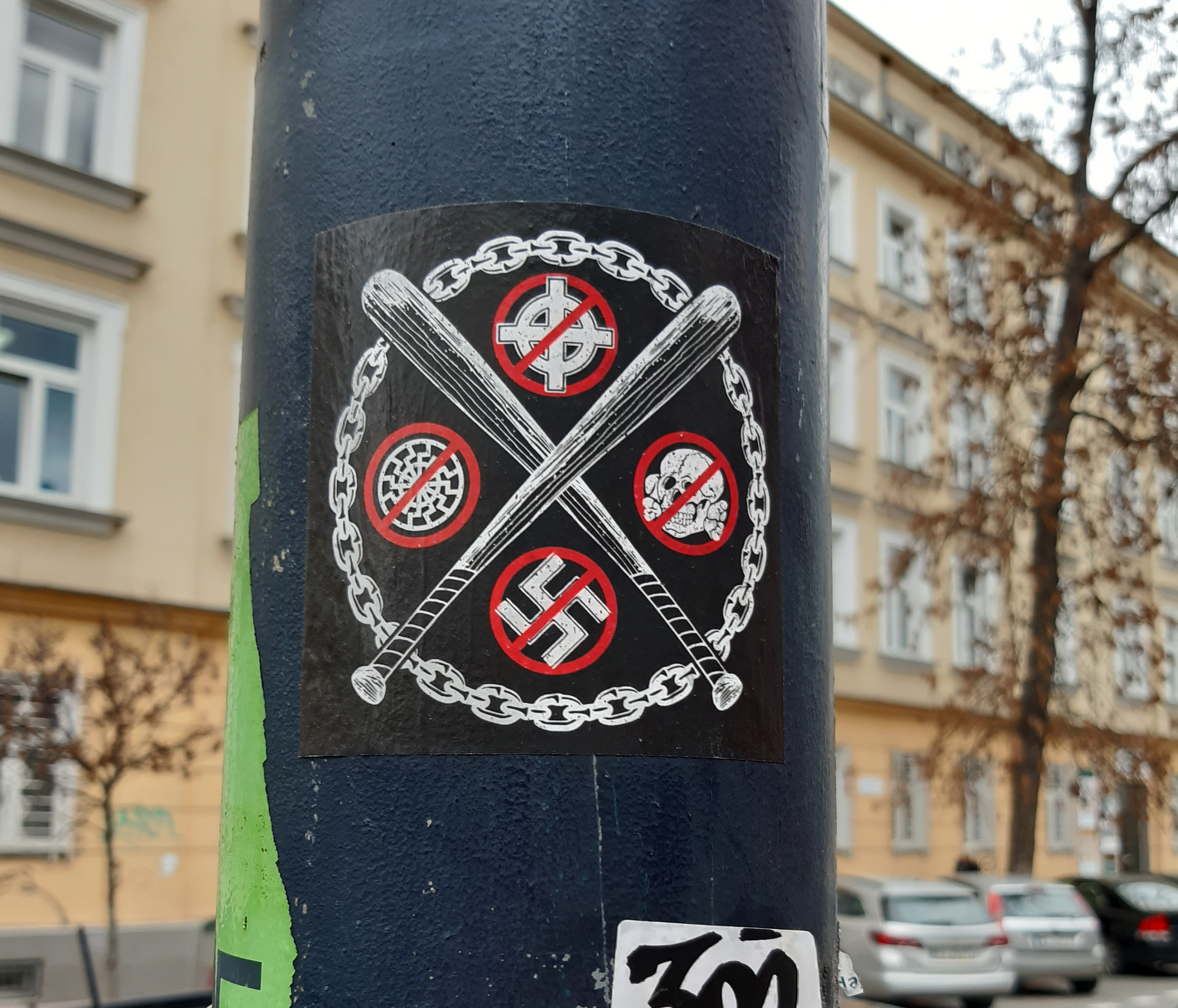
Antifascist sticker in Warsaw, Poland

The anti-fascist movements which emerged during the period of classical fascism, both liberal and militant, continued to operate after the defeat of the Axis powers in response to the resilience and mutation of fascism both in Europe and elsewhere. In Germany, as Nazi rule crumbled in 1944, veterans of the 1930s anti-fascist struggles formed Antifaschistische Ausschüsse, Antifaschistische Kommittees, or Antifaschistische Aktion groups, all typically abbreviated to "antifa". The socialist government of East Germany built the Berlin Wall in 1961, and the Eastern Bloc referred to it officially as the "Anti-fascist Protection Rampart". Resistance to fascists dictatorships in Spain and Portugal continued, including the activities of the Spanish Maquis and others, leading up to the Spanish transition to democracy and the Carnation Revolution, respectively, as well as to similar dictatorships in Chile and elsewhere. Other notable anti-fascist mobilisations in the first decades of the post-war period include the 43 Group in Britain.

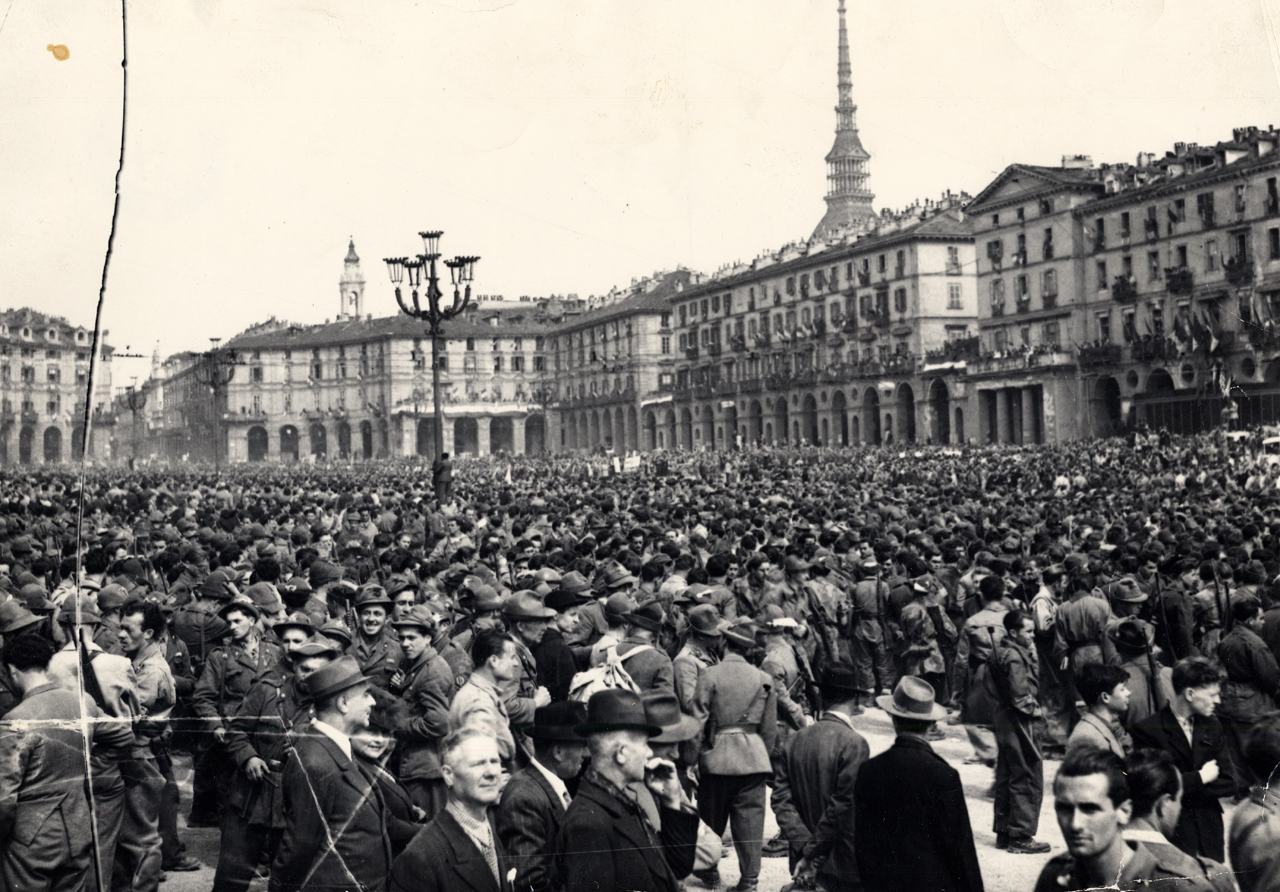
Liberation of Italy parade in Turin on 6 May 1945

The war ended in Italy on 2 May 1945, with the complete surrender of German and RSI forces to the Allied forces, as formally established during the so-called Surrender at Caserta on 29 April 1945, marks the definitive defeat of Nazism and Fascism in Italy. By 1 May, all of northern Italy was liberated from occupation, including Bologna (21 April), Genoa (23 April), Milan (25 April), Turin and Venice (28 April). The liberation put an end to two and a half years of German occupation, five years of war, and twenty-three years of fascist dictatorship. The aftermath of World War II left Italy bitter toward the monarchy for endorsing the Fascist regime for over 20-plus years. These frustrations contributed to a revival of the Italian republican movement. The liberation symbolically represents the beginning of the historical journey which led to the referendum of 2 June 1946, when Italians opted for the end of the monarchy and the creation of the Italian Republic. This was followed by the adoption of the 1948 Constitution of the Republic, created by the Constituent Assembly and representatives from the anti-fascist forces that defeated the Nazis and the Fascists during the liberation of Italy and the Italian civil war.

With the start of the Cold War between the former World War II allies of the United States and the Soviet Union, the concept of totalitarianism became prominent in Western anti-communist political discourse as a tool to convert pre-war anti-fascism into post-war anti-communism.

Modern antifa politics can be traced to opposition to the infiltration of Britain's punk scene by white power skinheads in the 1970s and 1980s, and the emergence of neo-Nazism in Germany following the fall of the Berlin Wall. In Germany, young leftists, including anarchists and punk fans, renewed the practice of street-level anti-fascism. Columnist Peter Beinart writes that "in the late '80s, left-wing punk fans in the United States began following suit, though they initially called their groups Anti-Racist Action (ARA) on the theory that Americans would be more familiar with fighting racism than they would be with fighting fascism".

==== Italy ====
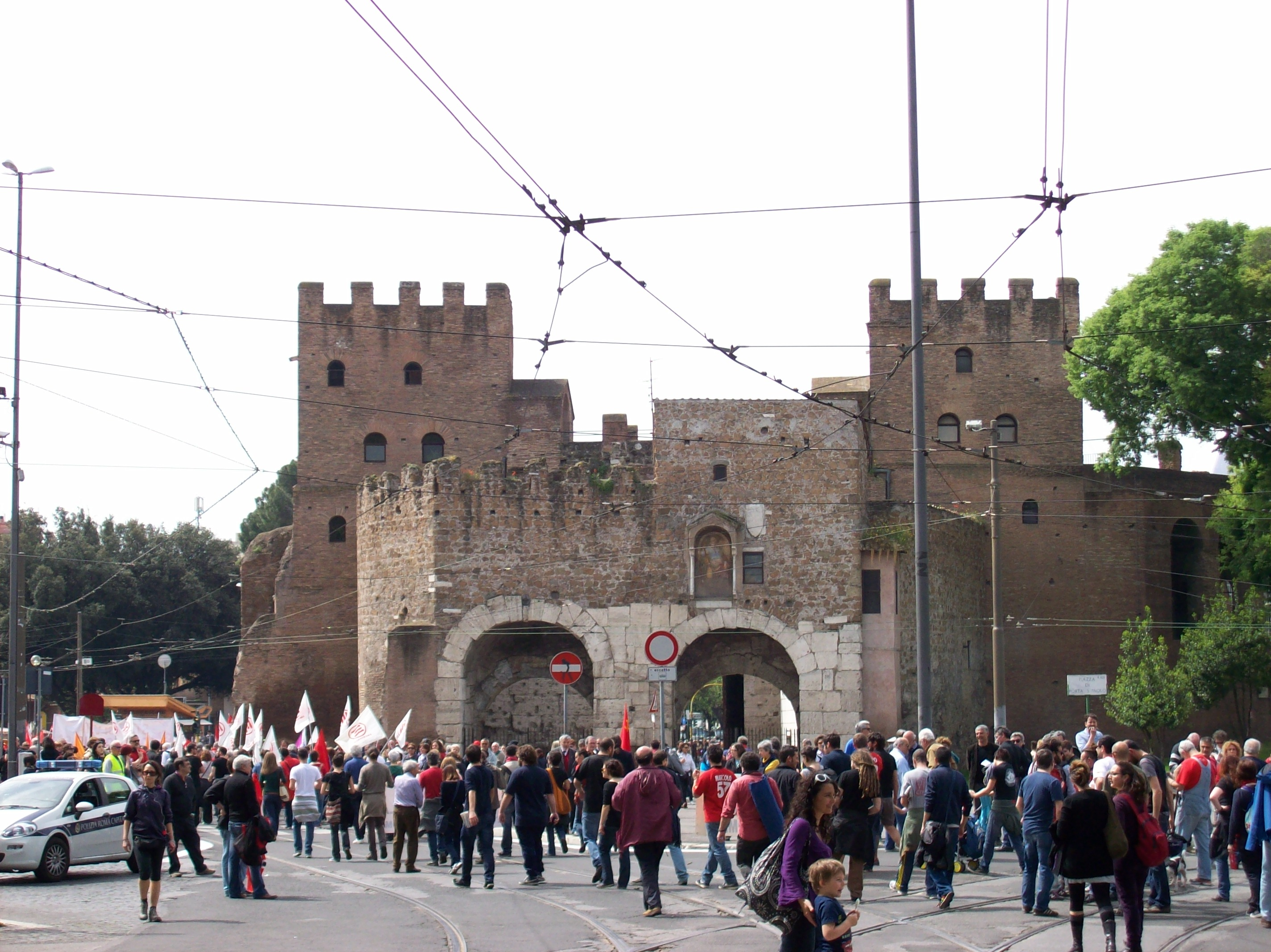
Anti-fascist demonstration at Porta San Paolo in Rome, Italy, on the occasion of the Liberation Day on 25 April 2013

Today's Italian constitution is the result of the work of the Constituent Assembly, which was formed by the representatives of all the anti-fascist forces that contributed to the defeat of Nazi and Fascist forces during the liberation of Italy.

Liberation Day is a national holiday in Italy that commemorates the victory of the Italian resistance movement against Nazi Germany and the Italian Social Republic, puppet state of the Nazis and rump state of the fascists, in the Italian Civil War, a civil war in Italy fought during World War II, which takes place on 25 April. The date was chosen by convention, as it was the day of the year 1945 when the National Liberation Committee of Upper Italy (CLNAI) officially proclaimed the insurgency in a radio announcement, propounding the seizure of power by the CLNAI and proclaiming the death sentence for all fascist leaders (including Benito Mussolini, who was shot three days later).

ANPI logo

Associazione Nazionale Partigiani d'Italia (ANPI; "National Association of Italian Partisans") is an association founded by participants of the Italian resistance against the Italian Fascist regime and the subsequent Nazi occupation during World War II. ANPI was founded in Rome in 1944 while the war continued in northern Italy. It was constituted as a charitable foundation on 5 April 1945. It persists due to the activity of its antifascist members. ANPI's objectives are the maintenance of the historical role of the partisan war by means of research and the collection of personal stories. Its goals are a continued defense against historical revisionism and the ideal and ethical support of the high values of freedom and democracy expressed in the 1948 constitution, in which the ideals of the Italian resistance were collected. Since 2008, every two years ANPI organizes its national festival. During the event, meetings, debates, and musical concerts that focus on antifascism, peace, and democracy are organized.

Bella ciao (instrumental only version performed by the Band of the Guard of the Serbian Armed Forces)

Bella ciao (Italian pronunciation: [ˈbɛlla ˈtʃaːo]; "Goodbye beautiful") is an Italian folk song modified and adopted as an anthem of the Italian resistance movement by the partisans who opposed nazism and fascism, and fought against the occupying forces of Nazi Germany, who were allied with the fascist and collaborationist Italian Social Republic between 1943 and 1945 during the Italian Civil War. Versions of this Italian anti-fascist song continue to be sung worldwide as a hymn of freedom and resistance. As an internationally known hymn of freedom, it was intoned at many historic and revolutionary events. The song originally aligned itself with Italian partisans fighting against Nazi German occupation troops, but has since become to merely stand for the inherent rights of all people to be liberated from tyranny.

==== Germany ====
Logo of Antifaschistische Aktion, the militant anti-fascist network in 1930s Germany that inspired the antifa movement

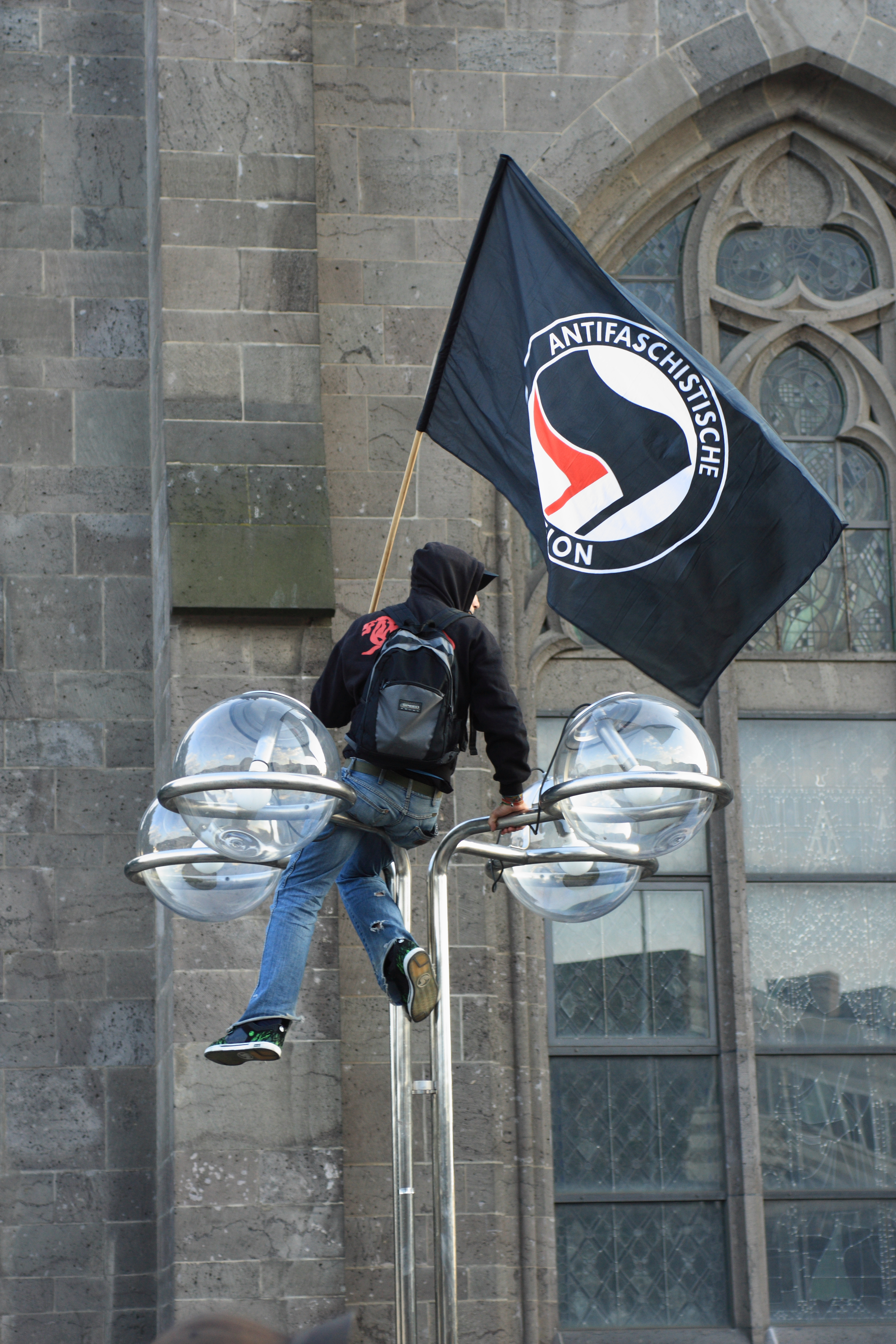
The logo as it appears on a flag held by an antifa protester in Cologne, 2008

The contemporary antifa movement in Germany comprises different anti-fascist groups which usually use the abbreviation antifa and regard the historical Antifaschistische Aktion (Antifa) of the early 1930s as an inspiration, drawing on the historic group for its aesthetics and some of its tactics, in addition to the name. Many new antifa groups formed from the late 1980s onward. According to Loren Balhorn, contemporary antifa in Germany "has no practical historical connection to the movement from which it takes its name but is instead a product of West Germany's squatter scene and autonomist movement in the 1980s".

One of the biggest antifascist campaigns in Germany in recent years was the ultimately successful effort to block the annual Nazi-rallies in the east German city of Dresden in Saxony which had grown into "Europe's biggest gathering of Nazis". Unlike the original Antifa which had links to the Communist Party of Germany and which was concerned with industrial working-class politics, the late 1980s and early 1990s, autonomists were independent anti-authoritarian libertarian Marxists and anarcho-communists not associated with any particular party. The publication Antifaschistisches Infoblatt, in operation since 1987, sought to expose radical nationalists publicly.

German government institutions such as the Federal Office for the Protection of the Constitution and the Federal Agency for Civic Education describe the contemporary antifa movement as part of the extreme left and as partially violent. Antifa groups are monitored by the federal office in the context of its legal mandate to combat extremism. The federal office states that the underlying goal of the antifa movement is "the struggle against the liberal democratic basic order" and capitalism. In the 1980s, the movement was accused by German authorities of engaging in terrorist acts of violence.

==== Greece ====
In Greece, anti-fascism is a popular part of leftist and anarchist culture. In September 2013, anti-fascist hip-hop artist Pavlos 'Killah P' Fyssas was accosted and attacked with bats and knives by a large group of Golden Dawn affiliated people leaving Pavlos to be pronounced dead at the hospital. The attack lead international protests and riots, the retaliatory shooting of three Golden Dawn members outside of their Neo Irakleio as well as condemnations against the party by politicians and other public figures, including Prime Minister Antonis Samaras. This episode led to Golden Dawn to being criminally investigated, with the result in sixty-eight members of Golden Dawn being declared part of a criminal organization whilst fifteen out of the seventeen members accused in Pavlos's murder were convicted, "effectively banning" the party.

==== United States ====
Dartmouth College historian Mark Bray, author of Antifa: The Anti-Fascist Handbook, credits the ARA as the precursor of modern antifa groups in the United States. In the late 1980s and 1990s, ARA activists toured with popular punk rock and skinhead bands in order to prevent Klansmen, neo-Nazis and other assorted white supremacists from recruiting. Their motto was "We go where they go" by which they meant that they would confront far-right activists in concerts and actively remove their materials from public places. In 2002, the ARA disrupted a speech in Pennsylvania by Matthew F. Hale, the head of the white supremacist group World Church of the Creator, resulting in a fight and twenty-five arrests. In 2007, Rose City Antifa, likely the first group to utilize the name antifa, was formed in Portland, Oregon. Other antifa groups in the United States have other genealogies. In 1987 in Boise, Idaho, the Northwest Coalition Against Malicious Harassment (NWCAMH) was created in response to the Aryan Nation's annual meeting near Hayden Lake, Idaho. The NWCAMH brought together over 200 affiliated public and private organizations, and helped people, across six states—Colorado, Idaho, Montana, Oregon, Washington and Wyoming. In Minneapolis, Minnesota, a group called the Baldies was formed in 1987 with the intent to fight neo-Nazi groups directly. In 2013, the "most radical" chapters of the ARA formed the Torch Antifa Network which has chapters throughout the United States. Other antifa groups are a part of different associations such as NYC Antifa or operate independently.

Modern antifa in the United States is a highly decentralized movement. Antifa political activists are anti-racists who engage in protest tactics, seeking to combat fascists and racists such as neo-Nazis, white supremacists, and other far-right extremists. This may involve digital activism, harassment, physical violence, and property damage against those whom they identify as belonging to the far-right. According to antifa historian Mark Bray, most antifa activity is nonviolent, involving poster and flyer campaigns, delivering speeches, marching in protest, and community organizing on behalf of anti-racist and anti-white nationalist causes.

A June 2020 study by the Center for Strategic and International Studies of 893 terrorism incidents in the United States since 1994 found one attack staged by an anti-fascist that led to a fatality (the 2019 Tacoma attack, in which the attacker, who identified as an anti-fascist, was killed by police), while attacks by white supremacists or other right-wing extremists resulted in 329 deaths. Since the study was published, one homicide has been connected to anti-fascism. A DHS draft report from August 2020 similarly did not include "antifa" as a considerable threat, while noting white supremacists as the top domestic terror threat.

There have been multiple efforts to discredit antifa groups via hoaxes on social media, many of them false flag attacks originating from alt-right and 4chan users posing as antifa backers on Twitter. Some hoaxes have been picked up and reported as fact by right-leaning media.

During the George Floyd protests in May and June 2020, the Trump administration blamed antifa for orchestrating the mass protests. Analysis of federal arrests did not find links to antifa. There had been repeated calls by the Trump administration to designate antifa as a terrorist organization, a move that academics, legal experts and others argued would both exceed the authority of the presidency and violate the First Amendment.

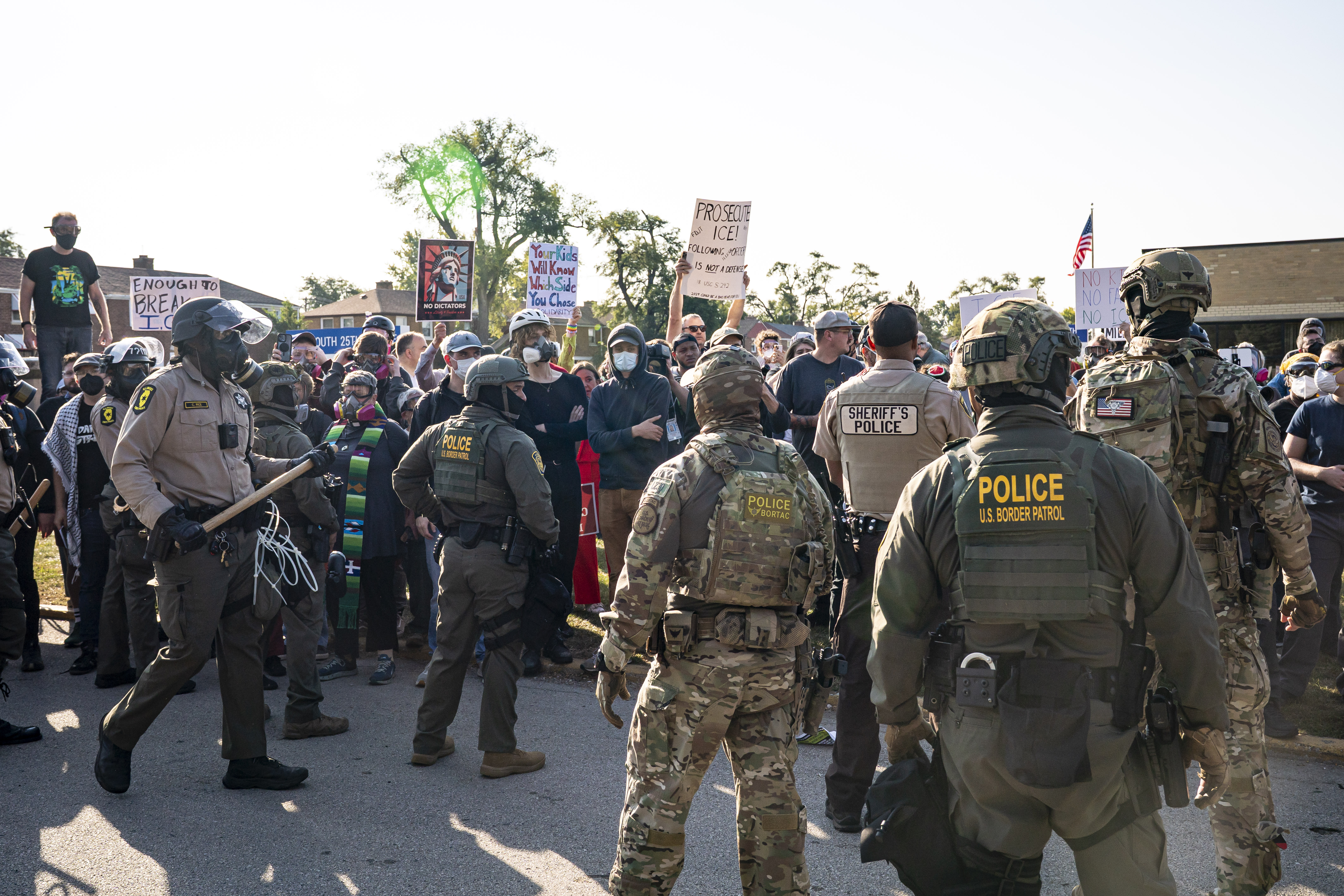
Masked protesters at an anti-ICE protest in Chicago during Operation Midway Blitz, 2025

During the 2026 Delaney Hall protests, where protesters clashed with ICE agents, a Rolling Stone reporter said when they arrived at the scene, "Militant, masked anti-fascists stared down a line of ICE agents in full combat gear — body armor, helmets, guns — standing at the gates of the facility."

==== Elsewhere ====
Some post-war anti-fascist action took place in Romania under the Anti-Fascist Committee of German Workers in Romania, founded in March 1949. A Swedish group, Antifascistisk Aktion, was formed in 1993.

In the United Kingdom, anti-fascist groups and movements organised over the years, such as the 43 Group (1946), the 62 Group (1962), Searchlight magazine (1975), Rock Against Racism (1976), the Anti-Nazi League (1977), Red Action (1981), Anti-Fascist Action (1985), Unite Against Fascism (2003), Hope not Hate (2004), and Red Flare.

Following a similar decision by American president Donald Trump, Hungarian Prime Minister Viktor Orbán announced in September 2025 that Hungary would classify "Antifa" as a terrorist organization. Orbán justified this classification by denouncing the violence that occurred in Budapest in 2023, where anti-fascist activists attacked alleged participants in the Day of Honor, a neo-Nazi event, even though anti-fascist groups are not very politically active in Hungary, where Orbán's party has exercised almost total control for more than 15 years, and even though it is a decentralized ideological movement with no formal hierarchical structure, rather than an organized group.

== Use of the term ==
The Christian Democratic Union of Germany politician Tim Peters notes that the term is one of the most controversial terms in political discourse. Michael Richter, a researcher at the Hannah Arendt Institute for Research on Totalitarianism, highlights the ideological use of the term in the Soviet Union and the Eastern bloc, in which the term fascism was applied to Eastern bloc dissidents regardless of any connection to historical fascism, and where the term anti-fascism served to legitimize the ruling government.

== See also ==
- All-Slavic Anti-Fascist Committee
- Anti anti-communism
- Anti-authoritarianism
- Anti-capitalism
- Anti-Nazism / Denazification
- Anti-Chinilpa (Korea)
- Anti-fascist Assembly for the National Liberation of Macedonia
- Anti-fascist Assembly for the National Liberation of Serbia
- Anti-Fascist Committee of Cham Immigrants
- Anti-Fascist Council for the National Liberation of Yugoslavia
- Anti-fascist works
- Antifascist Front of Slavs in Hungary
- Anti-Germans (political current)
- Anti-racism
- Anti-Stalinist left
- Jewish Anti-Fascist Committee
- Laws against Holocaust denial
- Resistance during World War II
- Redskin (subculture)
- Slovak National Uprising
- Squadism

== Notes ==
=== Bibliography ===
- Brennan, T Corey (2022). The fasces: a history of ancient Rome's most dangerous political symbol. Oxford University Press. ISBN 978-0-19-764488-1 – via Google Books.
- Copsey, Nigel (2016). Anti-Fascism in Britain. Taylor & Francis. ISBN 978-1-317-39762-5 – via Google Books.
- Diner, Dan; Gundermann, Christian (1996). "On the Ideology of Antifascism". New German Critique (67): 123–132. doi:10.2307/827781. ISSN 0094-033X. JSTOR 827781.
- Eley, Geoff (1996). "Legacies of Antifascism: Constructing Democracy in Postwar Europe". New German Critique (67): 73–100. doi:10.2307/827778. ISSN 0094-033X. JSTOR 827778.
- Jarausch, Konrad H. (1991). "The Failure of East German Antifascism: Some Ironies of History as Politics" (PDF). German Studies Review. 14 (1): 85–102. doi:10.2307/1430155. ISSN 0149-7952. JSTOR 1430155.
- Mammone, Andrea (2006). "A Daily Revision of the Past: Fascism, Anti-Fascism, and Memory in Contemporary Italy". Modern Italy. 11 (2): 211–226. doi:10.1080/13532940600709338. ISSN 1353-2944. S2CID 145602289.
- Rabinbach, Anson (1996). "Introduction: Legacies of Antifascism". New German Critique (67): 3–17. doi:10.2307/827774. ISSN 0094-033X. JSTOR 827774.
