= Anti-Fascist Bloc =

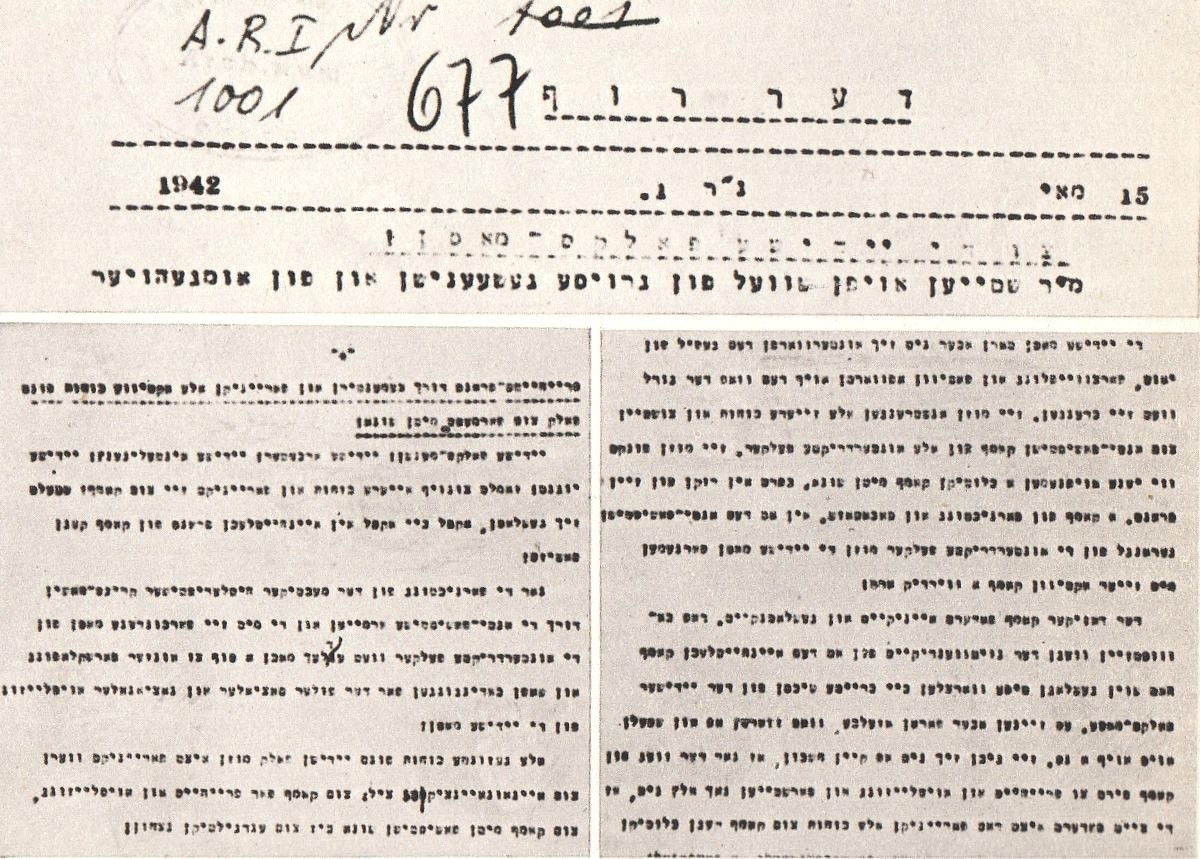
Proclamation of the Anti-Fascist Bloc (15 May 1942)

The Anti-Fascist Bloc was an anti-fascist organization of Polish Jews formed in March 1942 in the Warsaw Ghetto. It was created after an alliance between leftist-Zionist, communist and socialist Jewish parties was agreed upon. The initiators of the bloc were Mordechai Anielewicz, Józef Lewartowski (Aron Finkelstein) from the Polish Workers' Party, Josef Kaplan from Hashomer Hatzair, Szachno Sagan from Poale Zion-Left, Jozef Sak as a representative of socialist-Zionists and Izaak Cukierman with his wife Cywia Lubetkin from Dror. The Jewish Bund did not join the bloc though they were represented at its first conference by Abraham Blum and Maurycy Orzech. According to Hersz Berlinski and Izaak Cukierman, the Bund did not join because they were waiting for a general socialist organization to be formed which would encompass non-Jewish Poles.

The organization was active in the ghettos of occupied Poland, in the General Government, and in Silesia. It served as a basis for organized resistance against the Germans. It also published underground newspapers.

Members of the organization took part in the Warsaw Ghetto Uprising and the Białystok Ghetto Uprising, after being incorporated into the structures of the Jewish Fighting Organization. In Białystok, the bloc functioned under the name "Anti-Fascist Combat Bloc". Before the uprisings, the Bloc organized escapes from the ghettos and accumulated arms.
