= Michał Klepfisz =

Polish activist and engineer (1913–1943)

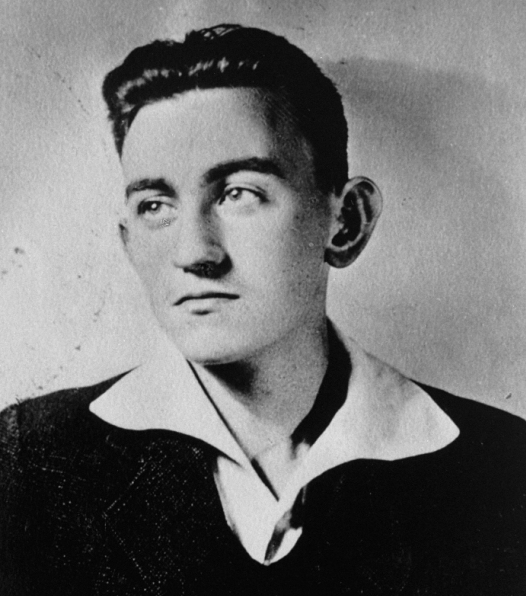
- Born: April 17, 1913; Warsaw, Congress Poland
- Died: April 20, 1943 (aged 30); Warsaw, Nazi occupied Poland
- Burial place: Okopowa Street Jewish Cemetery
- Military career
- Allegiance: Polish resistance
- Branch: ŻOB
- Conflicts: World War II: Warsaw Ghetto Uprising †
- Awards: Virtuti Militari

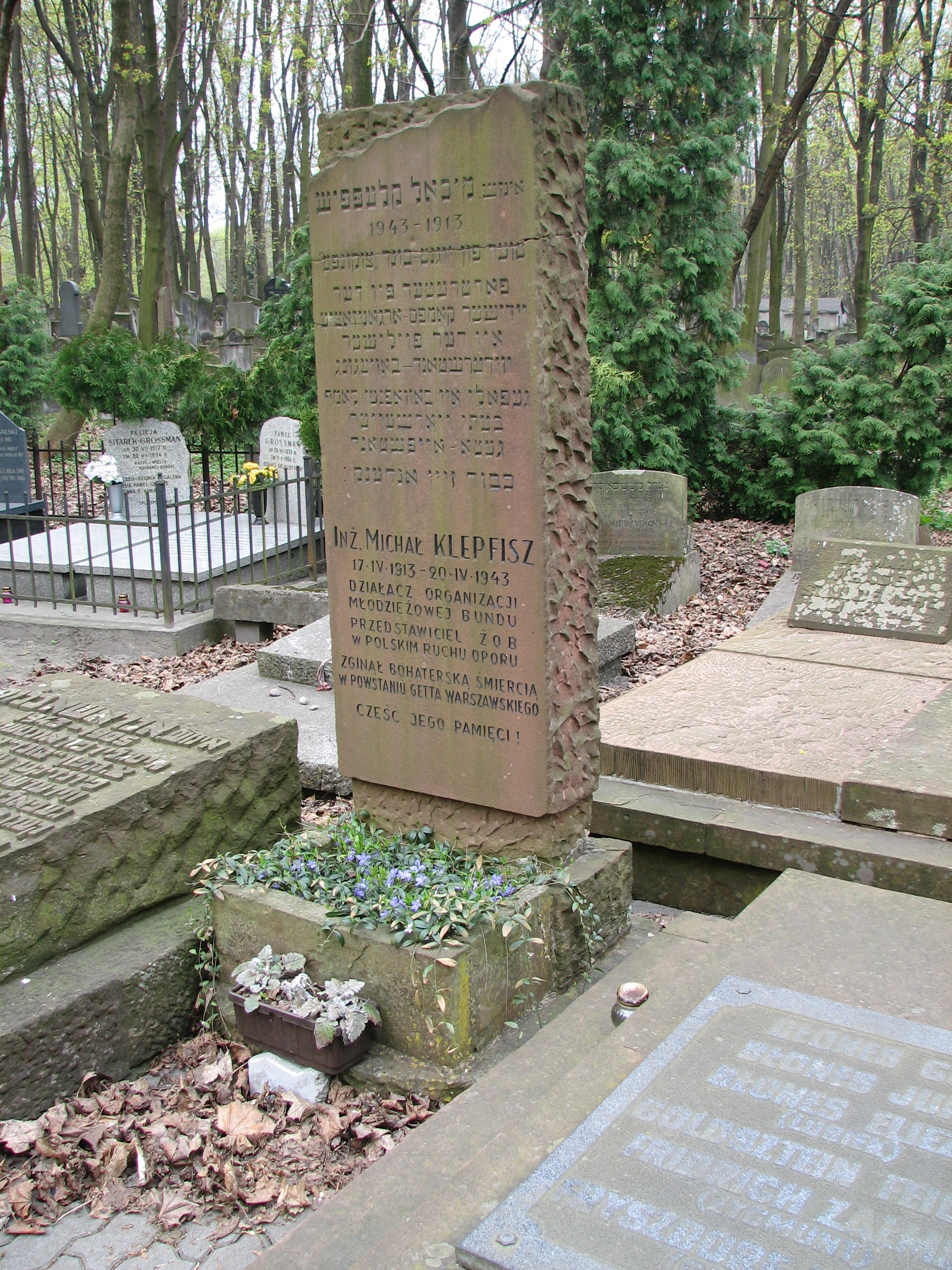
Klepfisz's cenotaph

Michał Klepfisz (Warsaw, 17 April 1913 – 20 April 1943, Warsaw) was a chemical engineer, activist for the Bund, and member of the Jewish Morgnshtern sports organization. During World War II he belonged to the Jewish Combat Organization, fighting the Nazi German forces in Poland. He was killed in the Warsaw Ghetto Uprising and was posthumously decorated by the Polish government in exile with a Silver Cross of the Virtuti Militari.

== Life ==
Klepfisz graduated from the Warsaw Polytechnic with a degree in engineering. In the interwar period he was a member of the Bund-affiliated Morgnshtern organization. In 1937 he married Róża Perczykof ("Lodzia"; later known as Rose Klepfisz, 1914–2016).

In 1942 he was put on a train to the Treblinka extermination camp by the Nazis, but escaped by taking out the metal screen behind the train window and made his way back to Warsaw. Soon afterward he managed to get his wife, sister Regina and daughter Irena smuggled out of the ghetto (they survived the Holocaust). They hid with a Polish woman, Maria Sawicka, a member of Żegota, who before the war had run track with Regina, and who had previously hidden Klepfisz when he had left the ghetto.

During the Warsaw Ghetto Uprising, Klepfisz directed the underground production of explosives for the Jewish resistance. After receiving instruction from the Polish Home Army (AK) in making Molotov cocktails, Klepfisz set up an underground bomb factory in the ghetto, while other members of the Jewish resistance smuggled in the necessary ingredients from the "Aryan side" (they had to be purchased from many unrelated suppliers so as not to raise suspicions). A major problem was how to test the explosives that he produced. Eventually Klepfisz bribed his landlord to let him test the home-made bombs in a deserted limekiln in a factory building owned by the man. Though the extent of Klepfisz's operation is unknown, in 1964, Polish workmen carrying out work on the site of the former factory unearthed 100,000 explosive-filled glass detonators for Molotov cocktails.

Together with Arie Wilner, Klepfisz also served as an intermediary between the Jewish Combat Organization and the Polish resistance movement organisation - Home Army. He was trained in explosives production by a Home Army soldier, Zbigniew Lewandowski (nom de guerre "Szyna"—"Rail"). Klepfisz, Wilner and Icchak Cukierman, through the AK, and through the AK-subordinated Polish Socialist Party, WRN (Polish Socialists not associated with Moscow) sent arms into the ghetto.

Klepfisz was called a "pillar of the uprising" by London radio. He was killed on the second day of the Uprising on Bonifraterska Street, in the brush-factory district, protecting the retreat of his fellow soldiers (including Marek Edelman) by covering a German machine gun with his own body. Gen. Wladyslaw Sikorski (Polish Commander-in-Chief and Premier of the Polish Government in Exile) decorated him posthumously with a Silver Virtuti Militari V class which is now on display at the United States Holocaust Memorial Museum in Washington, DC.

Michał Klepfisz was described by those who knew him as tall and thin, with a calm, quiet disposition. He has a cenotaph in the Warsaw Jewish Cemetery on Okopowa Street (grave #39609), with the inscription:

Engineer Michał Klepfisz. 17 IV 1913 – 20 IV 1943. Activist of the Bund youth organization. Jewish Combat Organization representative in the Polish resistance movement. Died a heroic death in the Warsaw Ghetto Uprising. Glory to his memory!

Klepfisz's sister, Regina Klepfisz, was also a Bund activist. His daughter, Irena Klepfisz (who, along with his wife, was smuggled out of the ghetto on the eve of the Uprising in 1943) survived the Holocaust and emigrated to the United States. She is a noted essayist and poet. The poems "The Widow and the Daughter" and "Searching for My Father's Body" are about Michał Klepfisz.

== See also ==
- List of Poles
- Bernard Goldstein
- Maurycy Orzech
