= Bernard Goldstein =

Bernard Goldstein may refer to:

- Bernard Goldstein (casino owner) (1929–2009), founder of the Isle of Capri Casinos
- Bernard Goldstein (Bundist) (1889–1959), Warsaw Uprising figure
- Bernard R. Goldstein (born 1938), historian of science
