= Klepfisz =

Klepfisz is a surname. Notable people with the surname include:

- Irena Klepfisz (born 1941), American author, academic and activist
- Michał Klepfisz (1913–1943), Polish chemical engineer
