= Maurycy Orzech =

Polish politician and leader of the Jewish Bund

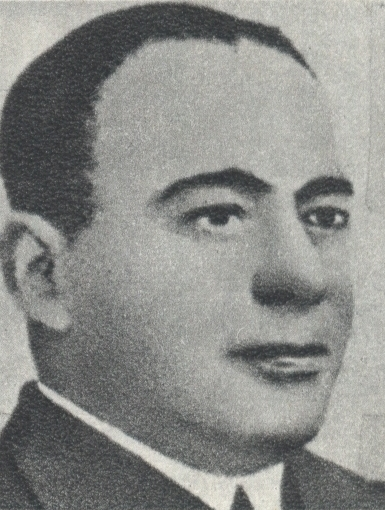
Maurycy Orzech

Maurycy Orzech (Polish pronunciation: [mawˈrɨt͡sɨ ˈɔʐɛx]; nom de guerre: Janczyn; 1891 – August 1943 in Pawiak, Warsaw) was a Polish Jewish economist, journalist, politician and a leader of the Jewish Bund in interwar Poland. He was one of the commanders of the Bund during the Warsaw Ghetto Uprising.

== Interwar Poland ==
Orzech joined the Bund in 1907 and was in charge of the party's newspaper, Forverts. In the late 1920s he served as chairman of the Bund-founded Socialist Association of Artisans of the Republic of Poland ("Socialist Artisans"). Orzech was also member of the Bund affiliated Morgnshtern sports organization. He owned a textile manufacturing factory, "Bazar Orzecha" which was very profitable. Orzech used money from his business to finance the Yiddish newspaper Folkstsaytung, of which he was also an editor.

== World War II ==
After the German invasion of Poland he tried, with help from the British embassy to escape on a ship to Sweden. However, he was arrested by the Germans and imprisoned in Berlin. Later, he was transferred to the Warsaw Ghetto. In the ghetto, Orzech worked for the charitable organization Joint. He also worked on the production of underground newspapers, including the Bundist Der Verker. In April 1942, the Germans began mass executions in the ghetto, supposedly as a way of combating underground literature. Orzech was summoned by Judenrat president Adam Czerniaków and asked that the Bund cease circulating its illegal newspapers. However, Orzech correctly surmised that the newspapers were just an excuse and that the mass executions were simply the first step in total extermination of Warsaw's Jews. The Bund refused Czerniaków's request. Orzech also wrote bulletins and proclamations to the residents of the ghetto not to trust the Germans and not to volunteer for supposed "labor in Germany" from the Umschlagplatz (which was in fact a collection point for deportation to the Treblinka extermination camp)

Most likely he was one of the organizers of the Antifascist Block (a group representing leftist Zionist and secular Jewish groups) and served as the Bund's representative at its conferences. Generally, Orzech saw the struggle of Poles and Jews against the German occupants as one and the same and favored the merger of Jewish resistance into Polish resistance. He, along with Leon Feiner, wrote the telegram which informed the Bundist member of the Polish government in Exile, Szmul Zygielbojm, about the outbreak of the Warsaw Ghetto Uprising.

== Death ==
In 1943, after the fall of the Ghetto Uprising, he escaped but was eventually arrested by the Gestapo. According to some sources he was arrested during an attempt to cross the Romanian border, brought back to Warsaw where he was placed in Pawiak prison, and killed in August 1943.

== See also ==
- Bernard Goldstein
- List of Poles
