= Zionist left =

The Zionist left is a combination of Zionism and left-wing politics, and may refer to:

- Labor Zionism
- Liberal Zionism (Left-leaning factions)

== See also ==
- Green Zionism
- Jewish left
- The Democrats (Israel)
