= Morgnshtern =

Jewish sports organisation in interwar Poland

- Arbeter Gezelshaft far fizisher Dertsiung "Morgnshtern" in Poyln; Robotnicze Stowarzyszenie Wychowania Fizycznego "Jutrznia" w Polsce
- מאָרגןשטערן
- Nickname: Jutrznia
- Successor: Jutrznia-Morgnshtern
- Formation: 1926
- Type: Sports organisation
- Headquarters: Warsaw
- Location: Poland
- Members: 1500 (1937)
- Official languages: Yiddish; Polish
- Secretary General: Bernard Goldstein
- Affiliations: Socialist Workers' Sport International

Morgnshtern (מאָרגןשטערן, Yiddish for 'Morning Star', sometimes also known by its Polish name Jutrznia) was a Jewish sports organisation in interbellum Poland, politically linked to the Bund. It was founded in the end of 1926. Morgnshtern increased significantly in influence in the period just preceding the Second World War. In 1937 the organisation had 107 local branches in different parts of the country. Its largest branch was based in Warsaw. In 1936, the Warsaw branch had 956 active members, in 1937 he membership reached around 1500 (making it the largest local sporting organisation in Poland) and 1855 in 1938.

Morgnshtern was repeatedly targeted by the Polish authorities; between 1929 and 1934, 23 local Morgnshtern branches were closed down. In 1937 Morgnshtern had prepared a delegation to take part in the Workers Olympics in Antwerp, Belgium, but the Polish government refused to give travel visas to the athletes.

The development of socialist sports was markedly affected by the rise of fascism in Europe. The socialist sport movement took a more paramilitary character, in order to mobilize anti-fascist defense. In the case of Morgnshtern, the Bund already had experiences from organizing militias against pogroms. Bernand Goldstein, the president of the Morgnshtern in Warsaw was also the chief of the Bundist Defense Corps (Goldstein himself did however later downplay his role in Morgnshtern, stating that the presidency was merely an honorary position).

Morgnshtern ceased to function as Poland was occupied by Germany. Many of the athletes of the organisation became resistance fighters during the war. Morgnshtern was revived after the war. Warsaw "Jutrznia-Morgnshtern" is the only remaining Morgnshtern branch.

== Socialist sporting ==
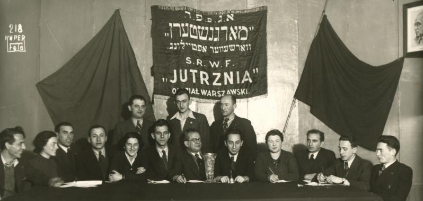
Morgnsthern meeting, 1937

Morgnshtern espoused principles of socialist sporting, seeking to promote proletarian camaraderie and collective achievements, rather than individual competition. These principles had been formulated in the book Sport und Politik ('Sports and Politics') by Julius Deutsch. Initially the organisation mainly organised sports were large numbers of people could participate at the same time, such as cycling, gymnastics and hiking.

The most popular activity of Morgnshtern was gymnastics. This was followed by ritmika (eurythmics), which mainly had female participants.

However, in order to increase recruitment the organisation eventually began opening up for more individually oriented competitive sports such as football, table tennis and boxing. Morgnshtern, although officially disliking football as a sport which glorified individual champions, had a few football teams affiliated to it already in the 1920s. Still though, compared to the Shtern federation of the Poale Zion Left or bourgeois Jewish sports organisations, Morgnshtern put very little emphasis on football. In 1930 the Central Organising Committee of Morgnshtern adopted a resolution on the 'football question', which concluded that the sport could be collective and inclusive if addressed in the right way. In the early 1930s, there were several football teams in Warsaw city affiliated to Morgnshtern. Following the adoption of the 1930 football resolution, the organisation began forming teams for table tennis (a Morgnshtern athlete formed part of the Polish national delegation at the 1938 World Championship in London), handball, basketball and volleyball.

The organisation was even more vocally opposed to boxing, and had proposed banning boxing from the Socialist Workers' Sport International at the 1929 SWSI congress. However, the Warsaw branch of Morgnshtern set up a boxing club in late December 1935, which was rather successful in the late 1930s.

== Relations with ZRSS and SWSI ==
A delegation of Morgnshtern participated in the 1927 congress of the Socialist Workers' Sport International. Morgnshtern had a complicated relationship with the Polish Workers' Sport Federation (ZRSS), due to political antagonism between the Bund and the Polish Socialist Party (which dominated the ZRSS). The two organisations clashes at the 1929 Prague congress of the Socialist Workers' Sports International, as Morgnshtern demanded to be recognized as a separate section and not as an affiliate of the Polish ZRSS. In the end, the congress accepted the demand. Morgnshtern sent its own delegation to the 1931 Workers Olympics in Vienna.

== Cultural and social activities ==
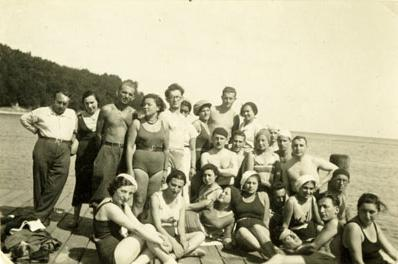
Morgnshtern members at a pier, during a sailing trip from Warsaw to Gdynia.

Apart from physical training, Morgnshtern also organized cultural activities. A mandolin orchestra and a theatre group were run by Morgnshtern in Vilna. The Morgnshtern branch in Warsaw organized visits to cinemas and theatres.

The summers Morgnshtern would rent a swimming pool, and offer swimming lessons to its members. In the winters, from 1933 onwards, the organisation had an ice-skating rink in Warsaw.

== Name ==
The full name of the organization was Arbeter Gezelshaft far fizisher Dertsiung "Morgnshtern" in Poyln in Yiddish, and Robotnicze Stowarzyszenie Wychowania Fizycznego "Jutrznia" w Polsce in Polish. After the 1929 congress of the Socialist Workers' Sport International, the organisation added and 'Jewish section of the Workers' Sports International' (yidishe sektsie fun arbeter sport internatsional) to its name.

== Emblem ==
The emblem of Morgnshtern featured a javelin thrower, illustrated in the style of a classic Greek statue, in front of belching smokestacks. The emblem also had the name of the organisation in Yiddish and Polish.

== See also ==
- Hapoel
- Maccabi
- Sokół
