= Bernard Goldstein (Bundist) =

Polish Jewish labor activist and resistance fighter (1889–1959)

- בערנאַרד גאָלדשטיין
- Born: 1889; Shedlits, Congress Poland
- Died: 7 December 1959 (aged 69–70); New York
- Other name: Khaver Bernard
- Organization: Home Army
- Notable work: •Five Years in the Warsaw Ghetto: The Stars Bear Witness, •Twenty Years with the Jewish Labor Bund: A Memoir of Interwar Poland
- Political party: Bund
- Movement: Socialism
- Board member of: Morgnshtern

Bernard Goldstein (Yiddish: בערנאַרד גאָלדשטיין, 1889-1959) sometimes called "חבֿר בערנאַרד" (romanized: "Khaver Bernard", translated: "Comrade Bernard"), was a Polish Jewish socialist, union organizer, and leader of the General Jewish Labour Bund in Poland prior to World War II. During the war, he was active in the Warsaw Ghetto, helping smuggle in arms in preparation for the 1943 Warsaw Ghetto Uprising.

After Poland's liberation from German occupation he emigrated to the United States and wrote his memoirs in Yiddish, which were translated and published as Five Years in the Warsaw Ghetto (originally titled The Stars Bear Witness) and Twenty Years with the Jewish Labor Bund: A Memoir of Interwar Poland.

== Life ==
In the late years of Imperial Russia, Goldstein's political activities landed him in Siberian exile and Russian prisons. Beginning in 1919, Goldstein was active as an organizer and militia leader in the Bund movement in Poland, and was later active in the Warsaw Ghetto resistance. During the time he spent living in and organizing resistance against the Nazis in the Ghetto, Nazi Germany systematically murdered half a million Jews once resident there.

Throughout the occupation, in spite of numerous confidence tricks by the Nazis and their assistants in the Jewish Gestapo to produce docility in the Ghetto population by labeling the forced removals to Treblinka as mere "work resettlement," Goldstein remained adamant that the Nazis were in fact gradually liquidating the Ghetto's residents. Via underground publications, Goldstein urged the Ghetto population to resist the German Army at all costs and not to cooperate with the Jewish collaborators whom the Gestapo controlled. When deportations started, his organization manufactured fake documents for those marked for liquidation.

When it became clear the Nazis were planning to kill everyone, Goldstein helped organize the Warsaw Ghetto Uprising which ultimately ended in the Ghetto's destruction. Goldstein escaped the Ghetto and evaded Gestapo arrest, survived the citywide 1944 Warsaw Uprising against the Nazis, and avoided imprisonment and execution as the Soviets rounded up Socialist resistance survivors.

In 1945 Goldstein immigrated to the US, where he wrote his memoirs in Yiddish. In his book Five Years in the Warsaw Ghetto, first translated and published by Viking Press of New York in 1949 as The Stars Bear Witness, he described life in the Ghetto and the heroic struggle of the Jewish Combat Organization there. His authority in the Bund leadership and his position in the Jewish underground during the war place him in contemporary world historiography as the chronicler of the last hours of Jewish Warsaw. A second volume of his memoirs, translated and published by Purdue University Press in 2016 as Twenty Years with the Jewish Labor Bund: A Memoir of Interwar Poland, offers a street-level view of Jewish life in Poland at that time.

== See also ==
- List of Poles
