= Sam Lesser =

British journalist and veteran

- Born: Manassah Lesser or Manasseh Lesser; 19 March 1915; Hackney, London, England
- Died: 2 October 2010 (aged 95)
- Other name: Sam Russell
- Education: South Hackney Central School; George Green's School; University College London
- Occupation: Journalist
- Spouses: Nell Jones (m. 1943; div. 1950) Margaret Powell (m. 1950; died 1990)

Sam Lesser (born Manassah Lesser or Manasseh Lesser and also known as Sam Russell; 19 March 1915 – 2 October 2010) was a British journalist and veteran of the Spanish Civil War's International Brigades. Lesser was one of the last surviving British veterans of the Spanish Civil War, and went on to serve as chair of the International Brigade Memorial Trust (IBMT), and write for the Daily Worker and its successor, the Morning Star.

== Early life ==
Lesser was born Manassah or Manasseh Lesser, the son of Polish immigrants and the eldest of eight children, in Hackney, London on 19 March 1915. He was raised as a practising Orthodox Jew and attended South Hackney Central School and George Green's School, then won a scholarship to attend University College London (UCL) in 1934, where he initially studied history before switching to Egyptology. He acknowledged in a 2007 interview that he was already "a bit Bolshevised" by the time he arrived at UCL. In 1935 Lesser joined the Communist Party of Great Britain (CPGB), a decision he credited to the party's anti-fascist stance; and participated in demonstrations against the British Union of Fascists in London.

While at UCL, Lesser also joined the Officers' Training Corps (OTC), something he later described as "something that I always have great difficulty explaining," and trained with the Royal Scots at Dover Castle. He justified joining the OTC by quoting Vladimir Lenin's maxim "An oppressed class which does not strive to learn to use arms, to acquire arms, only deserves to be treated like slaves", and later attributed the decision to a desire "to see how it worked and to learn how to fire a gun". He also later said that his training in the OTC, which was conducted in rural environments based on the experiences of the British Army in the First World War, was of little use in Spain where the fighting took place in cities.

== Spanish Civil War ==
=== Departure and Madrid ===
Lesser planned, in July 1936, to embark on an excavation under the supervision of Flinders Petrie. However, at the request of the CPGB, and the specific request of the party's general secretary Harry Pollitt, Lesser was among the first group of 30 British volunteers to depart for Spain in 1936, telling his mother he had gone to Egypt for his studies. He later recalled his having done so as "a gesture of solidarity" having observed the rise of fascism in Europe. He was also motivated by the Non-Intervention Agreement signed by the British government, which prevented the Second Spanish Republic from purchasing arms internationally. The CPGB gave Lesser money for a ticket to Paris and an address to report to when he arrived; from the Paris-Gare de Lyon he travelled by train to Perpignan. He took the pseudonym "Raimundo Casado" while crossing the Pyrenees, and travelled to Figueres, then Barcelona, then to the headquarters of the International Brigades in Albacete, where he trained. It was at this time that he took the name "Sam" and reversed "Lesser" to form "Russell." Alongside Lesser in the first group of British volunteers were John Cornford, Bernard Knox and Jock Cunningham.

After the nationalists broke through the Madrid Front, Lesser travelled overnight to Madrid. His first experience of combat came as part of a British unit in a French battalion in the Casa de Campo university campus in Madrid in October 1936, where his unit, which also included Cornford, Knox and writer John Sommerfield, was stationed on the front line close to the Philosophy and Letters building. The building had previously been occupied by Moroccan soldiers who had overrun Buenaventura Durruti's anarchist Durruti Column. As the British unit advanced into the building they fought alongside members of Durruti's militia and a group of miners from Asturias, and occupied the building for a week. Of the original 30 members of Lesser's unit, only six survived until mid-December, when they returned to Albacete.

=== Lopera and injury ===
In December 1936, Lesser joined a reconstituted British company alongside the other four English survivors of his former unit. They were sent across Spain to Andújar then went south to Lopera, where in January 1937 (having previously suffered a shrapnel-inflicted head wound) Lesser was hit by bullets in the back and foot, likely to have come from his own machine gun company. "I didn't know at the time where I'd been wounded – in which part of my body – except that when I tried to get up I couldn't. I just fell down", he later recalled. As his comrades had been forced to withdraw, Lesser remained in place until his friend Cunningham, who had insisted on looking for him, found him and, unable to locate a stretcher, dragged him away from the fighting. He was driven to a hospital in Linares. Cornford and Ralph Winston Fox were also killed near to Lesser in Lopera.

While recovering, he learned Spanish, was introduced to Miguel de Cervantes' Don Quixote, and worked in the office of the newly-formed British Battalion in Albacete during the Battle of Jarama. After the battle Lesser returned to Britain to seek proper medical treatment, carrying the list of casualties from Jarama. Upon his recovery, Lesser went to Paris, where he worked in the International Brigades recruitment office, assisting in the organisation of newly arrived volunteers and later leading a group of female volunteers to Spain in a fisherman's boat. He then went to Barcelona where he was told to rejoin the International Brigades, but failed a medical examination and was told that he would be unable to fight, a setback which led to a career in journalism.

Speaking about his experience in Spain to historian Max Arthur in 2009, Lesser said, "Asked if I would do it all again, I used to give an unequivocal reply that of course I would. But now I don't know if I would. I'm a very old man now and one of the things I experienced was that those of us who survived Spain experienced different sorts of treatment when we got back."

== Journalism ==
=== Radio and early Daily Worker career ===
With no prior experience of journalism, Lesser began producing and broadcasting propaganda radio programmes for the Republican cause. He was responsible for English language broadcasts at a Barcelona headquarters established to broadcast on shortwave in German, Italian, Portuguese and English. During this time the Daily Worker published an interview with Independent Labour Party volunteer Frank Frankford, conducted by Lesser, which had been edited to suggest that Frankford was accusing the Trotskyist POUM of fraternisation with fascists; and which claimed the POUM battalion commander was a fascist agent and that arms used in the May Days had been supplied by the Nationalists. Frankford later told Bernard Crick that Lesser had embellished his words but that "there are things still to be explained" and that fraternisation did occur. Crick speculated that the claims attributed to Frankford, in particular the admission that he had "committed the crime of taking part in the armed rising of Fascists against the anti-Fascist Government", may have been the inspiration for the "bizarre and pathetic" confessions made by characters in George Orwell's Animal Farm.

Lesser then became a correspondent for the Daily Worker in Barcelona, using "Sam Russell" as his byline and covering the Republicans' retreat at the border town of Figueres. Barcelona was at the time under attack from Benito Mussolini's forces (which had a base in Majorca), who, Lesser wrote,

bombed our area of Barcelona, and I shall never forget the smell there when I went outside. There was one wonderful row of lime trees – a beautiful scent when they're in flower ... The gutter was literally flowing with blood, and the smell of the blood of these poor people was mixed with the smell of the lime trees.

He left Barcelona the day before the city fell to the Nationalists in January 1939. Lesser was the Daily Worker's correspondent in Paris and Brussels, leaving Paris after the banning of the Communist Party following the Molotov–Ribbentrop Pact and fleeing Belgium after the Nazi invasion in May 1940. He returned to Britain, where the wounds he had received in Spain prevented him from serving in the British Army. Instead, he worked for four years as an inspector in a Napier & Son aircraft factory in west London, also serving as a shop steward. He rejoined the newspaper in the final months of the war and in 1945, following the lifting of the government's ban on publication of the Daily Worker, he flew in a Royal Air Force Avro Lancaster bomber dropping food supplies in the Netherlands.

=== Moscow correspondent and foreign editor ===
Writing for the Daily Worker, Lesser visited Jersey following its occupation, covered the 1952 show trial of Communist Party of Czechoslovakia general secretary Rudolf Slánský, and witnessed Nikita Khrushchev's rise to power. Living in the Soviet Union as the Daily Worker's Moscow correspondent from 1955 until 1959, he became friends with spies Guy Burgess and Donald Maclean, two of the Cambridge Five, and travelled from Moscow to report on the Soviet invasion following the Hungarian Revolution of 1956. Lesser replaced Peter Fryer in Budapest after Fryer resigned in protest at his reports, which supported the rebellion, having been rewritten by the paper. Though Lesser's first despatch from Budapest, headlined "Kadar reveals the facts", was sympathetic to Soviet-installed Prime Minister János Kádár, his attempts to report on the realities of everyday life led the Communist Party of the Soviet Union to request his withdrawal from Moscow, which was refused by the British party. Having been tipped off regarding the content of Khrushchev's report "On the Personality Cult and its Consequences" (known as the "Secret Speech") and being aware that a Reuters journalist planned to file the story once outside of Russia, he sought verification from the Soviet Communist Party, arguing that it would be better a sympathetic journalist such as himself to tell the story than for it to be first reported in the capitalist press. He was told, however, that "just because you are a friend doesn't mean you can look in our cupboard." He later said that despite his having filed a 12-page report to his London newsroom, only a few paragraphs appeared in the paper.

As foreign editor, Lesser was based in London but reported from Nigeria, where he covered the 1960 independence celebrations, and from Cuba during the 1962 Cuban Missile Crisis, where he conducted a five-hour-long interview with Che Guevara. Guevara told him that if the missiles had been under Cuban control, Cuba would have retaliated against perceived aggression from the United States by firing on American boats and cities. In 1963 he published a pamphlet on the execution of the Spanish Communist politician Julián Grimau entitled Murder in Madrid, which sold over 5000 copies. Lesser later reported from Prague during the 1968 Warsaw Pact invasion of Czechoslovakia, of which he was critical; and from North Vietnam during the Vietnam War.

Lesser was in Chile during the 1973 coup d'etat, his report of which began "I saw democracy murdered in Chile by a rabble of Rip van Winkle general and admirals recruited by the CIA to impose a savage military dictatorship on a people which had seen and welcomed the dawn of a new era". Tribune's obituary for Lesser named his 1973 report from Chile as "possibly his finest hour – a great testament to his reporting skills and political commitment." He also reported on the beginnings of a new democracy in Spain following Francisco Franco's death in 1975. During his career with the Daily Worker and Morning Star, Lesser held the positions of home reporter, diplomatic correspondent, Moscow correspondent and foreign editor. He retired in 1984 at the age of 69, but continued contributing articles to Seven Days, the Communist Party's own weekly newspaper.

== Personal life ==
Lesser's younger brother Frank also served in the International Brigades, and preceded his older brother as Moscow correspondent for the Daily Worker after the Second World War.

While in Barcelona, Lesser met Margaret Powell, a nurse. Powell, who was born in 1913 in Llangenny, Wales, arrived in Spain in 1937 and worked in International Brigade hospitals in Aragon, and at the end of the war was interned in a French concentration camp with Spanish refugees. She later worked with Quakers attending refugees, for which the Spanish Republican government in exile made her a Dame of the Order of Loyalty to the Spanish Republic. After the end of the civil war she helped to found Britain's first nurses' union, worked as a nurse in the rearguard during the Second World War, volunteered to help Yugoslavian refugees in Egypt, and worked with refugees and in maternity clinics in Germany.

Lesser married Daily Worker switchboard operator Nell Jones in 1943, but shortly after renewed his acquaintance with Powell. He divorced Jones and married Powell in 1950. She lived with Lesser in Moscow during his time as a correspondent there, and on their return to England resumed nursing and was active in the Campaign for Nuclear Disarmament. Margaret died in 1990. She and Lesser had one daughter, Ruth.

== Later life ==
=== Political allegiances ===
Though he initially supported Khrushchev's reforms, he cited his experience surrounding the "Secret Speech" and the Soviet invasions of Hungary and Czechoslovakia, as experiences which changed him politically, and later acknowledged that he was troubled by his own credulity in reporting the Slánský show trial.

In the 1980s, splits developed in the Communist Party and the Morning Star between traditionalists and the dominant Eurocommunists. Lesser, in his capacity as the National Union of Journalists' Father of the Chapel, joined the Eurocommunist wing in opposition to Morning Star editor Tony Chater. The Communist Party was dissolved in 1991, and Lesser joined the Labour Party. Also in the 1990s, Lesser backed the post-Communist Democratic Left organisation. In November 2000, Lesser described himself not as a communist but as a socialist, and acknowledged that some friends considered him a Blairite. He said that having lived in Lambeth, he could "see the terrible, terrible damage that was done to the Labour party by the ultra-left," and felt that Clause IV of the Labour Party Constitution, which called for state ownership of industry before its revision in 1995, was outdated.

=== Poetry ===
In 2007 Lesser's poetry was featured alongside other British war poets who wrote during the Civil War in Poetas ingleses del siglo XX, an anthology of British poets edited by Carmelo Medina Casado and published in Madrid in 2007. His poetry was previously unpublished. He also wrote an autobiography, which was never published.

=== Spanish citizenship and IBMT ===
In his retirement Lesser frequently visited Spain. In 1996 he was among the International Brigade veterans who returned to Spain to be offered honorary Spanish citizenship, an experience he described as "remarkable, really remarkable," and commented "I don't mind admitting I was moved to tears." The offer, however, made to all surviving veterans of the International Brigades, was accompanied by the proviso that the veterans would have to renounce their own nationalities, which few were prepared to do.

Lesser was a founding member of the International Brigade Memorial Trust (IBMT), an organisation established in 2001 to educate the public in the history of the International Brigades and remember those who died in the Spanish Civil War. Lesser was chair of the IBMT from 2006, succeeding fellow International Brigade veteran Jack Jones who became IBMT President. Following Jones's death in April 2009 Lesser refused to succeed him and remained chair until his death.

Following the re-election of José Luis Rodríguez Zapatero's (Spanish Socialist Workers' Party) government (see 2008 Spanish general election) the Cortes Generales passed legislation confirming the right of the surviving brigadiers to Spanish citizenship without renouncing their own nationalities. On 9 June 2009 Lesser and Lou Kenton were among seven volunteers (six from Britain and one from Ireland) who received Spanish passports and citizenship as a gesture of thanks. Carles Casajuana, Spain's ambassador to Britain, told the veterans that "Your efforts were not in vain. Your ideals are part of the foundations of our democracy in Spain today." Lesser gave a speech in fluent Spanish, linking the Spanish Civil War to the fight against the British National Party, who he argued "have the same filthy policy of racism, which started off in Germany with Hitler's campaign against the Jews." He also spoke of his sadness that so few of his comrades were still alive to witness the gesture, and quoted Laurence Binyon's "Ode of Remembrance":

Age shall not weary them, nor the years condemn.
At the going down of the sun and in the morning, we will remember them.

At the end of his speech Lesser gave a raised fist salute. In his book Unlikely Warriors, historian Richard Baxell wrote that Lesser "spoke clearly and eloquently ... though an occasional catch in his voice betrayed the emotional intensity of the occasion." Tribune's obituary remarked that the speech showed "He may have moved away from communism to become an admirer of Tony Blair, but this was the old Sam Lesser fire."

In July 2009 he appeared at the International Brigade memorial in Lambeth's Jubilee Gardens, where he paid tribute to Jones, and on 7 May 2010 he appeared at the unveiling of a plaque honouring the 90 members of the International Brigades killed at the Battle of the Ebro, where he gave a speech in Spanish condemning the lack of support shown to Republican volunteers by representatives of the British government. In his final weeks Lesser opened an exhibition about the International Brigades at the Marx Memorial Library and chaired an IBMT committee meeting in London. Lesser died in London on 2 October 2010 at the age of 95, leaving instructions for his ashes to be scattered near the International Brigade memorial at Montjuïc in Barcelona.

== See also ==
- Jewish volunteers in the Spanish Civil War
