= Clive Branson =

English artist

Clive Ali Chimmo Branson (1907 – 25 February 1944) was an English artist and poet, and an active communist in the 1930s. A number of his paintings are in the Tate Gallery. His wife was Noreen Branson (16 May 1910 – 25 October 2003). Their daughter is the artist Rosa Branson (born 1933).

== Life ==
Branson was born in Ahmednagar, India, the eldest son of British Indian army officer Lionel Hugh Branson and Winnifred Emily Chimmo. His younger brother, Cyril, was a naval officer who appeared in the 1942 film In Which We Serve.

He was an active recruiter for the International Brigade, and himself fought in the Spanish Civil War from January 1938, being captured at Calaceite on 31 March 1938. As a prisoner of war at the Nationalist camp of San Pedro de Cardeña, he painted and sketched the camp and many of its inmates, at the request of the authorities; some of this work survives in the Marx Memorial Library in London.

He married Noreen Browne in 1931. Their daughter Rosa Branson was born in 1933. He died in action in Burma on 25 February 1944, where he was serving as a Sergeant in the British Army, as part of the 54th Training Regiment of the Royal Armoured Corps.

Branson was killed commanding an M3 Lee tank of B Squadron, 25th Dragoons. He was hit a glancing but fatal blow on the back of the head by a Japanese anti-tank shell near Point 315 at the end of the Battle of the Admin Box. Branson was a popular man in the unit and his crew "were inconsolable". His friend, the composer Bernard Stevens, dedicated his 1945 Symphony of Liberation to the memory of Branson.

== Sources ==
- British Soldier in India: The Letters of Clive Branson (1945), with introduction by Harry Pollitt.
- Richard Baxell. Unlikely Warriors: The British in the Spanish Civil War and the Struggle Against Fascism (London: Aurum, 2012)
- Mirante, Edith: “A Death in Arakan: Clive Branson, Antifascist Painter and Poet” Mekong Review (2023, March) online
- Richard Knott: The Secret War Against the Arts (Pen & Sword, 2020).
- Richard Knott (ed.): 'The Selected Poems of Clive Branson' (Smokestack Books, 2023).
