= Margot Heinemann =

Communist

Margot Claire Heinemann
- Born: 18 November 1913; West Hampstead, London, England
- Died: 10 June 1992 (aged 78)
- Education: Roedean School, King Alfred School, London, Newnham College, Cambridge
- Known for: Communist activism, trade union activism, fellow of New Hall, Cambridge
- Partner: J. D. Bernal
- Children: 1

Margot Claire Heinemann (18 November 1913 – 10 June 1992) was a British Marxist writer, drama scholar, and leading member of the Communist Party of Great Britain (CPGB).

== Early life ==
She was born at 89 Priory Road, West Hampstead, London NW6. Her parents were Meyer Max Heinemann, a merchant banker, and Selma Schott, both non-Orthodox Jews from Frankfurt, Germany. Heinemann was educated at Roedean School and at King Alfred School in London, and read English at Newnham College, Cambridge from 1931, later graduating from Cambridge University with a BA with first class honours. She was the lover of John Cornford while a student. The historian Eric Hobsbawm, who studied at Cambridge at the same time, wrote "she probably had more influence on me than any other person I have known."

== Career ==
She joined the CPGB in 1934, because of its active opposition to the British Union of Fascists.

After Cambridge she taught 14-year-old girls at Cadbury's Continuation School in Bournville, now Bournville College, on day release from the chocolate factory. In the CPGB she worked in the Labour Research Department from 1937.

She stood as the communist candidate for Vauxhall Constituency in the 1950 General Election.

In 1959 she resumed teaching at Camden School for Girls and then Goldsmiths College from 1965 to 1977. In 1976 she was made a Fellow of New Hall, Cambridge (now Murray Edwards College). She was still teaching at New Hall up to 1989 and stayed with the CPGB until it was dissolved in 1991.

== Personal life ==
She had a child (Jane, born 1953) with John Desmond Bernal.

== Works ==
- Britain's coal: A Study of the Mining Crisis, Left Book Club, 1944
- Wages Front, 1947, Labour Research Department
- Coal must come first, 1948, prepared for the Labour Research Department
- The Tories and how to beat them, Communist Party, 1951
- The Adventurers, 1960 (novel)
- Britain in the Nineteen Thirties, 1971 (with Noreen Branson)
- Experiments in English Teaching – New Work in Higher and Further Education 1976 (editor with David Craig)
- Culture and Crisis in Britain in the 30s, 1979 (with Jon Clark, David Margolies and Carole Snee)
- Puritanism and Theatre: Thomas Middleton and Opposition Drama under the Early Stuarts, 1980
- History and the Imagination – Selected Writings of AL Morton, 1990 (editor)
