= Noreen Branson =

British communist activist (1910–2003)

- Noreen Branson, 1926
- Born: 16 May 1910; London, England
- Died: 25 October 2003 (aged 93)
- Occupations: Historian, trade unionist, communist revolutionary
- Organization: The Bach Choir
- Known for: Smuggling funds to anti-colonial Indians and communists. Writing volumes 3 & 4 of the official history of the CPGB.
- Notable work: History of the Communist Party of Great Britain, Volume 3 (1985) & Volume 4 (1997)
- Political party: Independent Labour Party (1931); Communist Party of Great Britain (1932–1991)
- Spouse: Clive Branson (m. 1931; died 1944)
- Children: Rosa Branson
- Relatives: Henry Ulick Browne, 5th Marquess of Sligo (paternal grandfather)

Noreen Branson (16 May 1910 – 25 October 2003) was a British communist activist, historian, founder of Revolt newspaper, and a life-long member of the Communist Party of Great Britain (CPGB). In 1931 she married fellow communist and International Brigadeer, Clive Branson, and in 1934 she carried out a mission for Harry Pollitt to smuggle funding to Indian communists resisting the British colonial occupation of India. Noreen Branson was most known for her work as a historian, working as a researcher for the Labour Research Department, collaborating with historians Eric Hobsbawm and Roger Simon, and writing the 3rd and 4th volumes of the CPGB's official history.

== Early life ==
She was born on 16 May 1910 in London. Her father was Colonel Alfred Browne and her paternal grandfather Henry Browne, 5th Marquess of Sligo, a UK and Irish peer.

Both of Noreen Branson's parents died when she was eight years old. In August 1918, Noreen's mother died from typhoid fever, and eleven days later Noreen's father was killed in combat in France. The experience of losing her parents sparked her life-long interest in anti-imperialist and anti-war politics. After losing both her parents, she was raised by her wealthy maternal grandparents in Berkley Square. Her grandparents raised her with bourgeois and aristocratic values, and presented her as a debutante in court in 1928. Despite being indoctrinated with upper class values, she would seek out socialist groups due to her anti-war beliefs.

=== Husband and daughter ===
Noreen Branson joined The Bach Choir in 1929, and in 1931 at the age of 20 took part in a Charity Concert at the Scarlet Theatre in east London. During this event she met the painter and poet Clive Branson, and agreed to marry him within days of first meeting him. Noreen Branson married Clive Branson in June 1931, and two years later the couple had their only child, the future artist Rosa Branson. Noreen was at this point in her life not very interested in politics, however her husband Clive held strong socialist beliefs and was a supporter of the Soviet Union and Marxism–Leninism. The couple began having more frequent discussions on politics and often lent each other books.

== Adult political life ==
=== Joining the Communist Party ===
Wishing to become more politically active and feeling betrayed by Ramsay MacDonald's "defection", both Noreen and Clive Branson joined the Independent Labour Party in Chelsea in Autumn 1931. The couple began campaigning in the poorest parts of the borough and began distributing a newspaper titled Revolt which they along with a small group of associates produced. While conducting political work in run-down housing blocks, she became more aware of the poverty which existed under British capitalism and came face-to-face with issues such as unemployment. These experiences convinced her that capitalism was a failed system, and both she and her husband joined the Communist Party of Great Britain (CPGB) in July 1932 and turned Revolt into a communist party newspaper. Soon after joining the CPGB, Noreen and her husband moved to Battersea where they became icons of the working class community and Noreen became the secretary of the local CPGB branch in 1936.

=== Anti-fascist and anti-colonial activism ===
Noreen Branson's talent as a communist party activist was noticed by Harry Pollitt who in 1934 dispatched her to Mumbai to smuggle funding to Indian communists resisting the British colonial occupation of India.

In 1935 she attended the 7th World Congress of the Communist International in Moscow and spent several months as a comintern messenger to underground parties in Europe without being caught. Her aristocratic upbringing allowed her to move throughout Europe without arousing suspicion. Noreen Branson and Clive Branson dedicated much of their time to opposing fascism, opposing Oswald Mosley and his supporters, but also rallying opposition to Hitler, Mussolini and Franco. Noreen then joined the North Battersea Co-operative Women's Guild and represented the organisation on the Aid Spain Committee, established in 1936 by the Battersea Trades Council. In early 1938 Noreen's husband Clive joined the International Brigades to fight against Nazi backed nationalist forces in the Spanish Civil War, however he was captured on the 3rd of April and was kept prisoner for 8 months. Noreen sent Clive and fellow republican prisoners funding to buy cigarettes, as a way of letting the prisoners know that they had not been forgotten. While Clive was being held as a POW, Noreen began working as a researcher for Harry Poillitt and then for the Labour Research Department where she specialised in welfare and social services. She published her first article in the Labour Research Department magazine in September 1938 and continued to routinely contribute to the magazine for another 65 years. She also edited the magazine for 25 years.

=== Second World War ===
Come the beginning of the World War II, Noreen Branson signed up to become an air raid warden. Inspired by her work as an air raid warden, her husband Clive included Noreen's likeness in his painting Bombed Women and Searchlights (1940) which is currently held by the Tate art museum in London. Noreen's home city of Battersea soon became a key target for German V1 and V2 rockets due to the presence of its close network of railway tracks and power station. While Clive was away on military duty, his and Noreen's home was bombed by the Germans, after which Noreen moved to Hampstead. In 1944, Noreen's husband Clive Branson was killed in Burma by the Japanese when he was hit by an anti-tank shell near Point 315 at the end of the Battle of the Admin Box.

After Clive's death, Noreen published his letters, sketches and poems as a book titled A British Soldier in India.

=== Later life ===
After the death of James Klugmann, Noreen Branson took over the authorship of the official History of the Communist Party of Great Britain, adding volumes for the years 1927–41 and 1945–51.

== Death and legacy ==
Branson died on 25 October 2003. She was survived by her daughter Rosa Branson who was born in 1933 and is a painter.

== Works ==
- The British State (1958) as Katherine Hood, with Roger Simon as James Harvey
- Room At The Bottom: National Insurance in the Welfare State (1960) as Katherine Hood
- Britain In The Nineteen Thirties (1971) with Margot Heinemann ISBN 0586037578
- Britain in the Nineteen Twenties (1977) ISBN 0297770098
- Poplarism, 1919–1925: George Lansbury and the Councillors' Revolt (1979) ISBN 0853154341
- History of the Communist Party of Great Britain 1927–1941 (1985) ISBN 0853156115
- History of the Communist Party in Britain 1941–1951 (1997) ISBN 0853158622
