= Labour Research Department =

UK research organization

The Labour Research Department (LRD) is an independent trade union based research organisation, based in London, that provides information to support trade union activity and campaigns. About 2,000 trade union organisations, including 51 national unions in the UK, representing more than 99% of total Trades Union Congress (TUC) membership, are affiliated.

The Labour Research Department (LRD) began life in 1912 as the Committee of Enquiry into the Control of Industry.

Within a year, the Committee of Enquiry became the Fabian Research Department, led by figures including Sidney and Beatrice Webb, George Bernard Shaw and Robin Page Arnot. In 1918 it changed its name to the Labour Research Department.

The organisation's original purpose was to provide competing theories of industrial organisation, but the researchers found themselves inundated with requests for information from trade unions.

The unions wanted factual information for their campaigns, to protect their members and to use in negotiations and public meetings. Over a century later, the LRD continues to provide unions with the information they need to help them support their members.

Historical documents from the Labour Research Department are held in the TUC Library Collections at London Metropolitan University.

Its first monthly bulletin Labour Research was established in 1917, as the Monthly Circular.

== Publications ==
LRD publishes extensively on employment law, including the annual guide Law at Work. LRD publishes LRD booklets, Labour Research, Workplace Report, Fact Service and Safety Rep.

Full information on LRD's publications is available on their website

- www.lrd.org.uk

== Payline database ==
LRD maintains the Payline database of pay and conditions which contains information on pay settlements, pay rates, pensions, maternity, paternity and other terms and conditions. The database contains information on more than 2000 agreements.

- Payline database

== Research ==
LRD carries out research on collective bargaining, equality, health and safety, union developments, workers participation. Published research includes

- TUC Equality audit (2012)
- TUC Safety reps Survey (2012)
- Widening the gender gap: a report on women's pay and jobs in Europe (2011)

LRD is a member of the Trade Union related Research Institutes (TURI) network.

== See also ==
- List of trade unions
- Margot Heinemann
- Noreen Branson
