= Rosa Branson =

English painter

Rosa Branson MBE (born 1933) is a British painter and fabric designer, living in Highgate, London. She is the daughter of Clive Branson and Noreen Branson, and a second cousin of Richard Branson.

== Early life and education ==
Rosa graduated from the Camberwell School of Art as a painter, and after studying at the Slade School, she trained under Professor Helmut Ruhemann, the Chief Restorer of the National Gallery, and spent six years copying works by the Old Masters at the National Gallery in London.

== Career ==
In her career, Rosa has worked in fabric collage design, watercolour and glass design, but her main speciality is the Old Masters oil painting technique of layering subtle glazes of translucent paint over each other. In Rosa's words she is painting the 'modern world using the Old Masters technique'.

In a career spanning over 60 years, she has covered a variety of topics, including portraiture, still life, landscape, as well as producing many large-scale charity paintings for organisations such as Oxfam, the Red Cross, and the Salvation Army. In 2010 recognised for her achievements in art and charity work with the MBE.

== Current affiliations ==
Rosa is associated with The Worlington Movement, which seeks to promote classical training for art students and to assist young artists in acquiring essential skills in drawing and oil painting. She runs a busy studio in Highgate, assisting in the development of artists such as Heath Rosselli Yuliya Lennon Tanja Hassel, Tracy Field, Cynthia Anatole, Dawn Kay and Sandra Busby.

== Life ==
=== Early life ===
Born to Clive and Noreen Branson, Rosa had a remarkable upbringing. Both of her parents came from a wealthy background but decided to abandon their privileged lives to join the Communist Party and live in Battersea. Her mother later became a historian of the Communist Party. Her father, a successful artist, was killed in Burma at the age of 36, which had a profound effect on Rosa. Before his death, her father has promised to teach her to paint, which made Rosa determined to become a real painter.

=== Education ===
After graduating from Camberwell School of Art, Rosa realised that she hadn't acquired the painting skill she needed to paint her visions. She joined the Slade, but found that the school teaching methods still did not meet her needs and went on to learn by copying various works by artists such as Rembrandt, Turner, El Greco at the National Gallery. Noticed by the Chief restorer, Professor Helmut Ruhemann, she received guidance and tuition from him for the next six years.

=== Life as a professional painter ===
Rosa's work first found recognition in her early 20s when she was admitted to the prestigious Royal Academy. Rosa's second subject in Camberwell was embroidery and when she had small children she stopped painting and applied her training at the National Gallery to creating fabric collages using the glazing technique of Old Masters. She completed over 100 collages.

Rosa works every day, with no weekends and very occasional holidays. She gets up at 5 o'clock and starts work at 9, with her day finishing at 5 pm. She has followed the same working pattern for over 60 years, which has allowed her to produce an enormous volume of work. She believes that it is hard work that makes a successful painter, and that great works of art can only be created by combining great ideas with great skill.

== Works ==
Rosa has completed over 600 paintings, which include a variety of subjects. In the last 20 years, the majority of her paintings are large-scale (5 feet by 8 feet) to fit the scope of her charity paintings. Examples of Rosa's paintings in publicly owned British collections can be found on the Art UK website.

== Shows ==
=== Solo exhibitions ===
- Woodstock Gallery, London, 1962 and 1964
- Munchick and Franks, London, 1971
- Barclays Bank, London, 1982
- Barbican Centre, London, 1985
- Auden Gallery, London, 1985
- Lyric Theatre, London, 1987
- Ashley's Restaurant, London, 1987
- Highgate Cemetery Chapel, London, 1992
- Bronte Restaurant, Oulton Hall, 1993

=== Mixed exhibitions ===
- Royal Academy
- Royal Institute of Oil Painters

London Group

- Young Contemporaries
- Society for Education through Art
- National Trust and Heritage of Britain
- Royal Festival Hall
- Mermaid Theatre
- Parsons Gallery
- Robley Gallery
- Easton Gallery
- Manor House Gallery
- Brandler Gallerie

== Collections ==
Private collections:

- Lambeth Palace
- Lord Sugar

== Awards ==
- Received an Honorary Doctorate from the University of Winchester in 2013
- Received the MBE for services to art and charity in the 2010 New Year's Honours
- Winner of the Morrison International Decanter Design Competition
- Guest at the 1993 “Woman of the Year"
