= International Brigade Memorial Trust =

British educational trust

The International Brigade Memorial Trust is a British educational trust formed by the veterans of the International Brigade Association, the Friends of the IBA, representatives of the Marx Memorial Library, and historians specialising in the Spanish Civil War.

The aims of the IBMT are to:

1. Educate the public in the history of the men and women who fought in the International Brigades and in the medical and other support services in the Spanish Civil War. In particular, by preserving and cataloguing valuable historical material relating hereto and by making such material available to the public.
2. To foster good citizenship by remembering those who have fallen in the Spanish Civil War by preserving, maintaining and assisting in the construction of war memorials.

The longest serving President of the International Brigade Memorial Trust was the late Jack Jones, former General Secretary of the Transport and General Workers Union, and himself a veteran of the British Battalion of the International Brigades. The IBMT holds an annual commemorative ceremony at the International Brigades memorial at Jubilee Gardens on the South Bank in London and organises a yearly lecture on the civil war, given by specialist academic historians from around the world.

The group maintains a map of memorials to volunteers in the Spanish Civil War.
