= Richard Baxell =

British historian

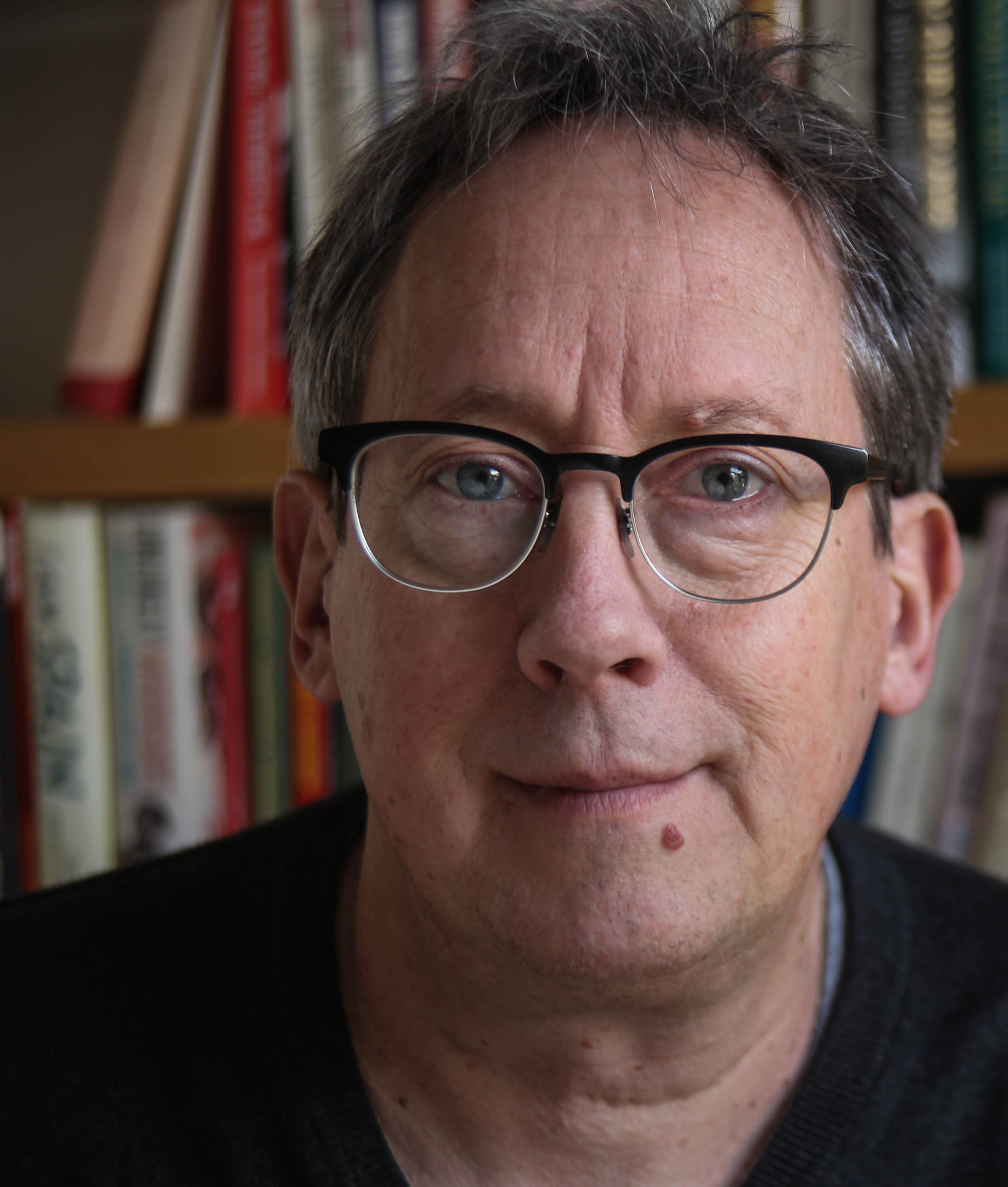
- Occupation: Historian

Academic background
- Education: Latymer Upper School
- Alma mater: Middlesex University
- Thesis: The British Battalion of the International Brigades in the Spanish Civil War, 1936–1939 (2002)

Academic work
- Discipline: History
- Institutions: London School of Economics
- Notable works: Forged in Spain; British Volunteers in the Spanish Civil War; Antifascistas; Unlikely Warriors

Richard Baxell is a British historian and the author of three books on the Spanish Civil War. Between 2015 and 2018 he was the Chair of the International Brigade Memorial Trust. Having studied history as an undergraduate at Middlesex University from 1991-1994 and as a post-graduate at the Institute of Historical Research in 1996, he received his PhD from the London School of Economics in 2002 with a thesis titled The British Battalion of the International Brigades in the Spanish Civil War, 1936–1939. As of 2020 he is a research fellow at the London School of Economics.

== British Volunteers in the Spanish Civil War (2004) ==
British Volunteers in the Spanish Civil War: The British Volunteers in the International Brigades, 1936–1939 was published by Routledge in 2004. The book engages with questions relating to the numbers, origins and motivations of Britons in the International Brigades, and utilises material from the Public Record Office and the Marx Memorial Library's International Brigade archives. Baxell argues that the British Battalion was not composed of poets, and its volunteers were not drawn from the unemployed and the lumpenproletariat; rather, Baxell argues, they were predominantly from the working and lower middle classes.

George Esenwein, writing in European History Quarterly, questioned "Baxell's pointed efforts to shift attention away from the complex web of political and ideological circumstances that inevitably shaped the experiences of the British battalion", including their connections to the Soviet Union and Stalinism, and argued that he failed to "offer a compelling case in support of his view that the British battalion was composed mostly of independent-minded volunteers who maintained a considerable degree of autonomy from the communist command structures of the International Brigades." Esenwein concluded by noting, "Even if Baxell's own advocacy of the brigadiers' cause tends to colour his historical judgements, we have him to thank for correcting misconceptions that have unfairly tarnished the reputation of this distinguished group of committed citizens".

In the journal Saothar, published by the Irish Labour History Society, Manus O'Riordan questioned Baxell's treatment of alleged "friction between some British and Irish volunteers" but praised his demonstration of "how other writers have got it wrong in maintaining that some Irish volunteers were wantonly executed by their own side".

== Laurie Lee in the International Brigades (2004) ==
In Laurie Lee in the International Brigades: Writer or Fighter?, delivered as a Len Crome Memorial Lecture and published by the International Brigade Memorial Trust in 2004, Baxell argues that the English writer was certainly a member of the International Brigades, but Laurie Lee's memoir, particularly his claim to have fought in Spain, is likely to have been largely fictitious.

== Antifascistas (2010) ==
Baxell is also the co-author, with Angela Jackson and Jim Jump, of Antifascistas: British & Irish Volunteers in the Spanish Civil War (2010), a book of short texts and pictures. Antifascistas accompanied an exhibition of the same name which opened in May 2010 and included photographs, posters, banners and personal accounts, many of which were taken from the Marx Memorial Library. An updated Spanish edition with an introduction by Angel Viñas was published as Help Spain by Pamiela in 2016.

== Unlikely Warriors (2012) ==
Unlikely Warriors: The British in the Spanish Civil War and the Struggle Against Fascism was published by Aurum Press in 2012. Baxell described the book as "the first to place the Spanish Civil War within the context of the volunteers' lives, rather than the other way round"; and said it seeks to deliver its narrative "from the perspective of the participants themselves using, wherever possible, their own words". The book was shortlisted for the 2013 Political Book Awards political history book of the year.

== Forged in Spain (2023) ==
Forged in Spain, published by The Clapton Press in 2023, is a collection of ten biographies recounting the lives of a number of extraordinary men and women who left their families and friends to risk their lives in the Spanish Civil War.
