= Unlikely Warriors =

2012 history book by Richard Baxell

Unlikely Warriors: The British in the Spanish Civil War and the Struggle Against Fascism
- Author: Richard Baxell
- Cover artist: Leo Nickolls
- Language: English
- Subject: British volunteers in the Spanish Civil War
- Published: 2012 (Aurum Press)
- Publication place: United Kingdom
- Media type: Print
- Pages: 400
- ISBN: 9781845136970

Unlikely Warriors: The British in the Spanish Civil War and the Struggle Against Fascism is a history book by Richard Baxell about British people who served in the International Brigades during the Spanish Civil War. It was published by Aurum Press in 2012.

== Overview ==
Baxell described the book as "the first to place the Spanish Civil War within the context of the volunteers' lives, rather than the other way round"; and seeks to deliver its narrative "from the perspective of the participants themselves using, wherever possible, their own words". Set against the context of the 1930s in Britain—marked by the Great Depression, the growth of the Communist Party of Great Britain (CPGB) and the emergence of Oswald Mosley's British Union of Fascists—the book primarily deals with the International Brigades and their volunteers, but also covers those who were involved in other capacities, including George Orwell who fought with the POUM, British journalists who worked in Spain during the Civil War, and the small number of Britons who fought on the side of Francisco Franco. Baxell describes the May Days of 1937 in Barcelona and British participation in the Siege of Madrid and the Battles of Jarama, Brunete and the Ebro. He continues by describing the experiences of the British volunteers who departed Spain at the end of the war and those who were taken prisoner, and Civil War veterans' experiences of the Second World War. These included Tom Wintringham who helped to found the Home Guard and Bernard Knox, who joined the Office of Strategic Services.

The book begins with three chapters discussing the Brigadiers' responses to Depression-era Britain, campaigns against fascism in the UK, and the debates and varying responses to the Spanish Civil War in British society. The final three chapters and the epilogue look at events after Franco's victory, including the Molotov–Ribbentrop Pact and the CPGB's withdrawal of support for the Second World War, which it deemed imperialist (a position it later reversed). The intervening seventeen chapters deal with the Civil War itself and cover, among other topics, Britons working in medical aid, foreign correspondents, the involvement of the Independent Labour Party, and the experience of those imprisoned in camps by Franco's Nationalists.

== Critical reception ==
Writing in The Volunteer, a publication of the Abraham Lincoln Brigade Archives, historian Peter Stansky described Unlikely Warriors as "a culminating and I believe definitive accomplishment." Stansky praised Baxell's treatment of "the endless paradox of war"—that war "could not be ... more dreadful yet for many though not all who participated and survived, it was the most important and rewarding experience of their lives"—and his unromanticised account, concluding "This is a colorful, heroic, tragic and deeply troubling tale ... Based on an extraordinary range of material, it is a splendid thing to have this full and satisfying account." Alan Lloyd of the Morning Star praised Baxell's "pre-eminent knowledge of the British volunteers" and use of their own words to tell the stories; and wrote "The book is beautifully written and it's a totally absorbing read". Historian Francis Beckett, writing in The Tablet praised Baxell's detachment as bringing "something new" to the historiography of the Civil War and described Unlikely Warriors as "Well researched and luminously written".

Unite the Union named Unlikely Warriors as one of two "books of the month" for June 2013 and published a review by the historian Lewis Mates. Mates identified Baxell's inclusion of a chapter on those who fought for the Nationalists and "the wealth of detail [he] provides of the individual experiences of British fighters" as strengths, and praised his collation of published and unpublished accounts, interviews, correspondence and archival sources. Mates also published a review in the academic journal Contemporary British History in which he also noted Baxell's attentiveness to the conflicts between the International Brigades and the anti-Stalinist POUM, who some Communists claimed were acting on behalf of the fascists. However, Mates also described the six chapters dealing with events before and after the war as "a little disappointing", and questioned Baxell's treatment of Irish volunteers in Spain, his engagement with historiographical debates including whether the events constituted a war or a revolution and the International Brigades' relationship with the Communist International, and methodological questions relating to Baxell's varied sources. Concluding, Mates noted "that Unlikely Warriors is tailored to appeal to a wider market than simply academics" and described the book as "a well researched, largely balanced, highly readable and accessible narrative".

Unlikely Warriors was shortlisted for the 2013 Political Book Awards political history book of the year.
