= Angela Jackson (writer) =

British historian (born 1946)

Angela Jackson, (born 1946) is an English historian and writer. Her doctoral thesis, "British Women and the Spanish Civil War, was published in 2002 by Routledge. This was followed by Beyond the field of battle: (Testimony, Memory and Remembrance of a Cave Hospital in the Spanish Civil War, in Catalan and English. Inspired by the first-hand testimony of some of the women she interviewed for her historical research, she went on to write a novel, Warm Earth, published in 2007, also set in the period of the Spanish Civil War. At the novel's launch in Barcelona, historian Paul Preston said that, "her vibrant prose and emotional understanding breathe life into her unputdownable story of the sacrifices made and the dangers undergone by the remarkable women who went to Spain as volunteers during the civil war." In 2012, she published For Us it was Heaven (translated into Spanish under the title Para nosotros era el cielo), a biography of the British nurse Patience Darton, who worked with the International Brigades in Spain during the Civil War and later went to live and work in the China of Mao Zedong.

Jackson moved to Catalonia in 2001 and currently lives in Priorat, where she continues to be involved in the conservation of the historical memory of the war, especially the historical facts and the memory of the period of the Second Spanish Republic and the Spanish Civil War in the region of Priorat.

== Selected works ==
- British Women and the Spanish Civil War: Thesis, University of Essex, 2001; 1st ed. London, Routledge, 2002; 2nd ed. Barcelona, Warren & Pell Publishing, 2009; 3rd ed. London, The Clapton Press, 2020.
- Beyond the field of battle: Testimony, Memory and Remembrance of a Cave Hospital in the Spanish Civil War, Warren & Pell Publishing, 2005.
- At the Margins of Mayhem (Prologue and Epilogue to the last great battle of the Spanish Civil War), Warren & Pell Publishing, 2008.
- For Us it was Heaven: The Passion, Grief and Fortitude of Patience Darton from the Spanish Civil War to Mao's China, Sussex Academic Press, 2012.
- Warm Earth (Novel), Pegasus, 2007.
- Firing a Shot for Freedom, the Memoirs of Frida Stewart, with a Foreword and Afterword by Angela Jackson, London, The Clapton Press, 2020, ISBN 978-1-913693-00-8
