= Mary Bury =

English suffragist

- Organization(s): Newcastle Suffrage Society; National Union of Women's Suffrage Societies; Edinburgh Society for Equal Citizenship; Edinburgh Council for Prevention of War; Committee for Scotland for Spanish Relief
- Known for: Suffrage campaigning

Mary Bury was an English suffragist who was an active organiser for the National Union of Women’s Suffrage Societies (NUWSS) in northern England and Scotland in the campaign for women’s suffrage in the early 20th century.

== Suffrage work in Northeast England ==
In the first half of 1911 Bury became secretary of the Newcastle Suffrage Society and by December of 1912 had become an organiser for the NUWSS Northeast Federation of Suffrage Society.

Bury lectured widely, giving up her holidays to go on caravan tours in northern England, in August 1911 cycling from Nottingham to Burton to join a caravan tour. During the first half of 1913 she was active in helping set up suffrage societies in the northeast of England.

== Suffrage work in the Scottish Highlands ==
According to Lady Frances Balfour, Dr Elsie Inglis sent Bury to work in the Scottish Highlands. Between May 1913 and the outbreak of World War I she energetically supported and revitalised suffrage societies in the Highlands. In 1913 she spent several weeks in Dingwall and Tain, giving talks to NUWSS suffrage societies there. She then moved further north, speaking at Golspie, Brora, where she had to cope with rowdy interruptions, and Helmsdale. As a result of her work, branches of the NUWSS were established in Dornoch, Golspie, Brora and Helmsdale.

This work was also in preparation for Lady Frances Balfour’s tour to the Highlands in September 1913. Bury accompanied Lady Frances along with Mrs Hunter and Mrs Fraser of the Inverness Society. When Lady Frances turned south at Helmsdale, the three suffragists continued further north, up to Thurso, Watten and Wick. The tour was widely reported in papers. They spoke not only to established societies, but also to some fisherfolk at Embo. Bury was responsible for sending reports to local newspapers, and wrote letters to the editor to clarify issues.

In October and November Bury travelled north again, to Orkney and then Caithness, supporting local societies in Wick and Thurso, as well as outreach in other places such as Lybster.

In many places she spoke on the suffrage situation and issues, particular the sweated industry, but she also organised more social events for local societies, such as a tableaux where local members represented famous women in Dornoch in November 1913 and Brora in February 1914.

In 1914 up to the outbreak of the war she continued her work in Easter Ross, southeast Sutherland and Caithness. She successfully canvassed the Dingwall Society to send a representative to the NUWSS demonstration in London in February though unsuccessfully for Clyne Parish council. Due to her efforts and support the societies in these areas were flourishing in 1914.

== Activities during the war years ==
After the outbreak of war, and the secession of suffrage campaigning for the NUWSS, Bury turned her energies towards helping societies support war work, for example giving a talk at Nairn in November 1914. She then began helping organise the Scottish Women’s Hospitals for the rest of the war. Initially an initiative by Elsie Inglis, supported by the Scottish Federation of the NUWSS, it was then taken up by the National NUWSS. In November 1916 Mary Bury did a fundraising tour for the Scottish Women’s Hospitals, speaking at Wick, Lybster, Helmsdale, Brora, Golspie, Dornoch, Tain, Dingwall, Avoch and Inverness. At the same time, she was the main contact for the Highland suffrage societies who had turned their attention to supporting the war.

== National Union of Societies for Equal Citizenship ==
After the war, the NUWSS rebranded as the National Union of Societies for Equal Citizenship (NUSEC). Mary Bury by this time was based in Edinburgh, and became an organiser first of the Edinburgh Society for Equal Citizenship, giving talks to various groups and then as the Parliamentary Secretary of the Scottish Federation of Societies for Equal Citizenship (Eastern Scotland).

She continued to support various branches, lecturing widely on a number of topics, organising weekend schools, and also campaigning at by-elections in Scotland and northern England. Along with other NUSEC colleagues she campaigned for full suffrage in 1927 which was passed in 1928.

In the late 1920s she also became involved in anti-war groups, becoming treasurer of the Edinburgh Council for Prevention of War.

Once full suffrage was achieved, the NUSEC turned to a number of women’s issues. Mary Bury, still Parliamentary Secretary, became one of the organisers to establish Townswomen’s Guilds, with the aim to help women understand how to use the vote as well as with a focus on crafts. As the Edinburgh Evening News reported ‘The Guild hopes to do for townspeople what the Women’s Rural Institutes do for country districts.’

By 1931 her address was listed as Inverleith, but she travelled widely through Scotland (though not the Highlands) and northern England to promote the initiative. By 1933 there were around 100 branches in Great Britain.

She was well remembered in suffrage circles, with her presence noted at the funeral of Chrystal Macmillan in September 1937.

In the late 1930s she became involved in committees for Spanish Relief, where her address was listed as Corstorphine. She became the secretary of the Committee for Scotland for Spanish Relief in 1938.
