= Kate Mangan =

British artist, actress and journalist

Kate Mangan (née Foster; also subsequently known as Kate Kurzke, 1904–1977) was a British artist, actress and journalist.

== Early life and career ==
Katharine Prideaux Foster was born in Sedgley, Staffordshire, in 1904.

After leaving school, Kate attended the Slade Art School, before moving to Paris where she worked as a fashion model. She was frequently seen in the Café Royal with her admirer, Augustus John, or dining out at the Tour Eiffel. It was also in Paris where she met Sherry Mangan, the Irish American scholar and poet, in 1924. They were married in 1931 and separated three years later. She then met a refugee German artist, Jan Kurzke, with whom she travelled to Spain in 1934. She divorced Sherry in 1935.

Following the outbreak of the Spanish Civil War, Jan was one of a group of volunteers who went out to Spain to join the International Brigades and fought in defence of Madrid, alongside John Cornford, Bernard Knox and John Sommerfield. Kate followed him out to Spain, working first as a correspondent for the Christian Monitor and later in the Government press office in Valencia, reporting to Constancia de la Mora and Luis Rubio Hidalgo.

While she was working in Spain, Kate met a number of leading writers including W. H. Auden, Stephen Spender and Ernest Hemingway; journalists including Lawrence Fernsworth, Hugh Slater, Kitty Bowler and Milly Bennett; photographers including Walter Reuter, Robert Capa and Gerda Taro; International Brigade volunteers such as Tom Wintringham and Bob Merriman; doctors such as Norman Bethune and nurses such as Patience Darton. After Jan was seriously injured by shrapnel, Kate tracked him down to a hospital in Murcia and managed to get him out of Spain to convalesce with friends in Paris. She then returned to her work in the press pffice in Valencia.

== Personal life ==
After returning from Spain, Jan and Kate briefly reunited and their daughter, Charlotte Kurzke, was born in 1940. Jan was interned on the Isle of Man at the outbreak of the Second World War. They then went their separate ways, Kate and Charlotte living in a house in Steeles Road, Hampstead. She taught art at a London secondary school and later became an examiner for the Cambridge Local Examinations Syndicate. She was a founder member of the Hampstead Arts Council in 1945 and remained an active participant until her death in 1977.

Her sister Margaret Greville Foster, with whom she was close, later became a writer under the name Greville Texidor.

== Memoir ==
Kate’s memoir, Never More Alive: Inside the Spanish Republic, written shortly after her return to England, was published for the first time with a foreword by Professor Sir Paul Preston in 2020.
