= Rebecca syndrome =

Jealousy towards a partner's ex

Rebecca syndrome, also known as Retroactive jealousy, is the pathological emergence of jealousy towards an ex-partner of the current partner of the person experiencing it. The feeling of jealousy is considered pathological when it arises without solid grounds and when it reaches dimensions that affect the normal behavior of the person suffering from it. This can lead to hostile or passive-aggressive behavior toward the ex or current partner. Rebecca Syndrome can be aggravated or triggered if the previous relationship is remembered in a positive way or certain qualities in the ex are not seen in the current partner.

== Symptoms ==
Someone that has Rebecca Syndrome may become obsessive over the ex. This can lead to making unrealistic comparisons or having a sense of competition concerning the ex. This also leads to a sense of resentment to the ex or current partner. A major problem that Rebecca Syndrome can cause is insecurity. It can lead to thinking the one affected "isn't good enough" for your current partner with leads to needing constant reassurance to feel better.

== Origin of the name ==
It is named in homage to the novel Rebecca, written by Daphne du Maurier. The novel tells the story of the second spouse of a widower whose life is tormented by the idea that they will never be able to compete with Rebecca, the previous wife of their husband, who everyone claims was beautiful.

The success of the novel was such that it was adapted into a film by Alfred Hitchcock and into a radio play by Orson Welles. It has also inspired other authors such as Susan Hill, the author of Mrs. de Winter, and Carmen Posadas, the author of The Rebecca Syndrome: A Guide to Conjure Ghosts.
