= Felicity Ashbee =

- Born: Jane Felicity Ashbee; 22 February 1913; Broad Campden, Gloucestershire
- Died: 26 July 2008 (aged 95)
- Burial place: Seal, Kent
- Occupations: Designer, teacher, writer, and memoirist
- Notable work: Janet Ashbee: Love, Marriage, and the Arts & Crafts Movement (2002)
- Parent(s): Charles Robert Ashbee (father); Janet Ashbee née Forbes (mother)
- Relatives: Henry Spencer Ashbee (grandfather); William Carrick (great-uncle)

Jane Felicity Ashbee (22 February 1913 – 26 July 2008) was a British designer, teacher, writer, and memoirist of the Arts and Crafts movement, described as "crucial in reviving interest in the Guild of Handicraft" and significant in celebrating the reputations of her notable forebears.

== Personal life ==
Jane Felicity Ashbee was born in Broad Campden, Gloucestershire, one of the four daughters of Janet Forbes and designer and artist Charles Robert Ashbee. Her father was the founder in 1888 of the Guild of Handicraft, "a radical cooperative experiment in which craftsmen, emulating the workshops of medieval England, would produce handmade goods and pass on their skills to young apprentices." In addition to her father, who was a key figure in the Arts and Crafts movement, other famous relatives included her grandfather, the book collector Henry Spencer Ashbee, and great-uncle, photography pioneer William Carrick.

From the age of 6 to 10, Ashbee lived in Jerusalem, where her father was employed as a town planner and conservationist. She would later recall these years in her memoir, Child in Jerusalem. On returning to England, she and her sisters were educated at various schools in Kent.

Between 1932 and 1936, Ashbee studied at the Byam Shaw School of Art in London, and began a career as an art teacher and graphic designer. An accomplished artist, she particularly excelled in wood engraving and textile design. During the Spanish Civil War, she designed posters for the National Joint Committee for Spanish Relief to raise money for famine relief.

== Wartime ==
On the outbreak of the Second World War, Ashbee joined the Women's Auxiliary Air Force (WAAF); she was commissioned as an officer in June 1941. Though she felt her progression was hampered by her prior membership of the Communist Party of Great Britain, one historic success Ashbee as a plotter could claim was logging the first sighting of the flight of Hitler's deputy, Rudolf Hess, to Britain in May 1941. She worked as an intelligence officer at the Government Code and Cypher School at Bletchley Park.

During these years, she also directed amateur theatre performances at various military camps. After 1945, she returned to teaching and art, working at girls' schools in Hertfordshire and London. She taught at Queen's Gate School in London in the 1960s; the architect Sophie Hicks was one of her pupils and says her creativity was inspirational.

== Writing ==
Felicity Ashbee wrote articles on 19th- and 20th-century material culture, as well as books of memoir and biography. In 1988, she published a book on the life and work of her great-uncle William Carrick, a photographer in Russia, co-authored with Julie Lawson.

In 2002, a memoir of her mother titled Janet Ashbee: Love, Marriage, and the Arts & Crafts Movement, was published. The book depicted the unconventional marriage of her parents, including her father's homosexuality and her mother's significant affair, drawing on a collaborative journal kept by the couple, as well as private diaries, letters, and an unpublished autobiography. The Times described this as providing:

A nuanced account of the Arts and Crafts movement as her mother experienced it, including descriptions of important figures of the period, Frank Lloyd Wright and Edward Carpenter among them ... Janet's account of her inner struggles over her inadequate marriage — eloquently and sensitively illuminated by her daughter — is just as compelling.

In 2008, Ashbee published Child in Jerusalem, a memoir of her childhood years. For the Duration a memoir of her time in the WAAF, edited by Cleota Reed, was published in 2012 by Syracuse University Press.

As a major holder of memories and collections associated with her father and the wider Arts and Crafts movement, Ashbee regularly assisted writers and researchers in these areas. Alan Crawford's C. R. Ashbee: Architect, Designer & Romantic Socialist (1985) was dedicated to her.

== Death and legacy ==
Felicity Ashbee died on 26 July 2008, and was buried in the churchyard of St Peter and St Paul's in Seal, Kent. She was mourned as "probably the last close link with the inner circle of extraordinary creative talents fostered or inspired by William Morris".

In 2009, Court Barn, a museum in Chipping Campden, mounted an exhibition called "Felicity Ashbee: A life of her own".
