= What Is Vegetarianism? =

1898 pamphlet on Vegetarianism by John E. B. Mayor

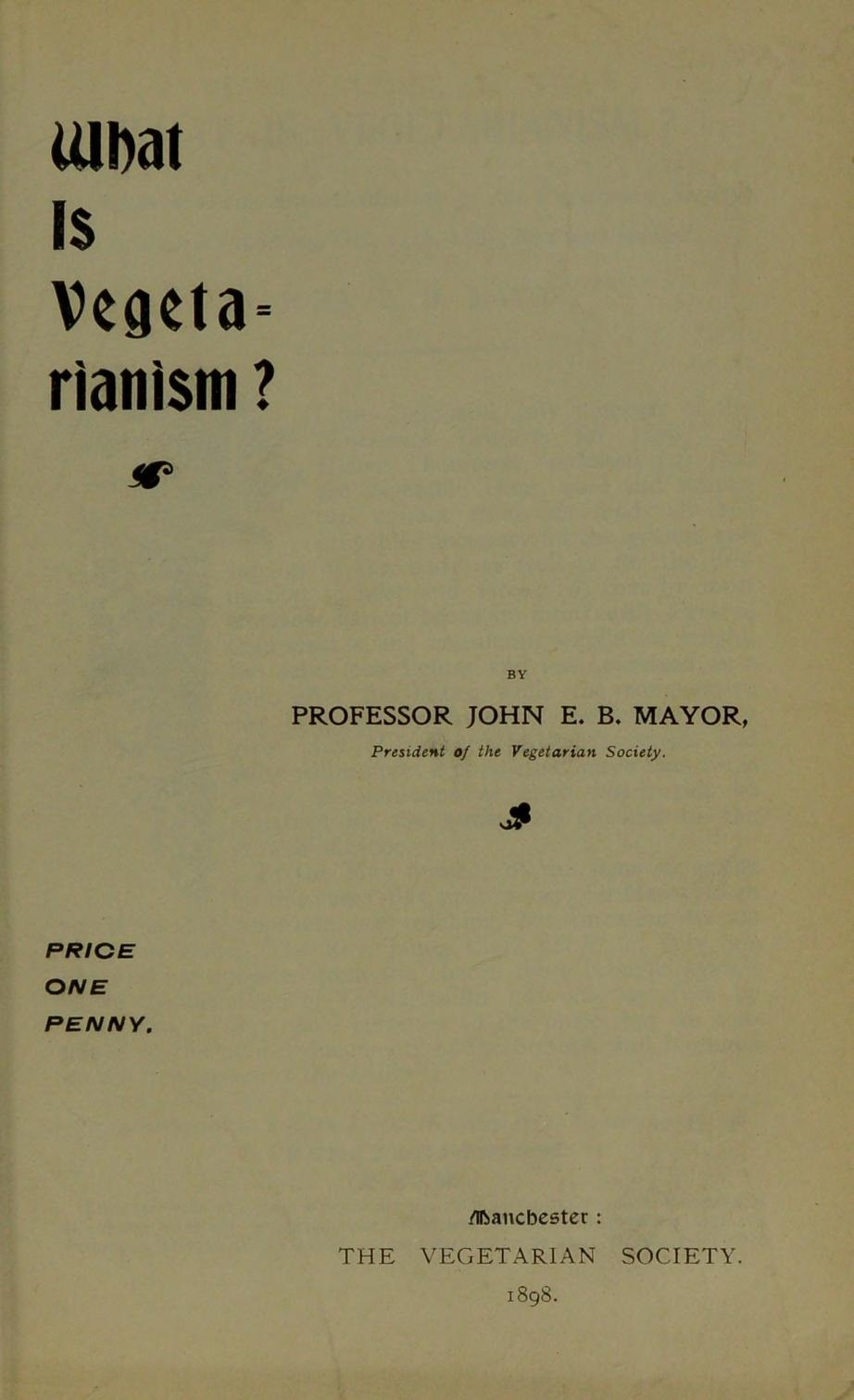
- Cover page
- Author: John E. B. Mayor
- Language: English
- Subject: Vegetarianism
- Genre: Pamphlet
- Publisher: Vegetarian Society
- Publication date: 1886
- Publication place: United States
- Media type: Print (pamphlet)
- OCLC: 316602399
- Text: What Is Vegetarianism? at Wikisource

What Is Vegetarianism? is an 1886 pamphlet written by John E. B. Mayor on vegetarianism.

== Background ==
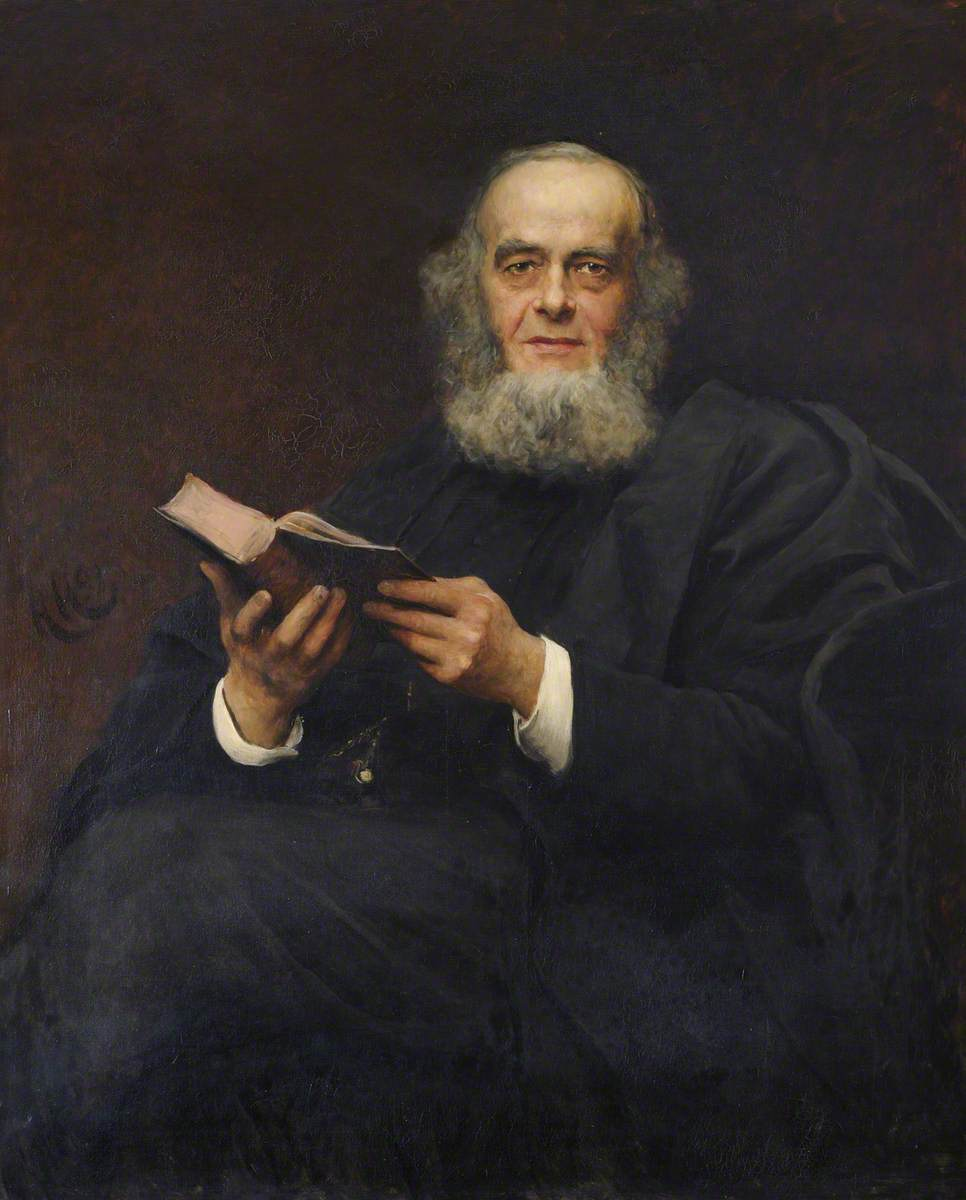
Oil painting by Herkomer, 1891

Reverend Professor John Eyton Bickersteth Mayor, born in Baddegama, Ceylon, in 1825, was an English scholar and writer. Mayor became a strict vegetarian and teetotaller. He was also librarian and a professor at the University of Cambridge, and as noted in Cassell's Family Magazine, a "well-known classical scholar."

At thirteen years old, Mayor had eschewed all animal products for a whole Lent. He later returned to a mixed diet of vegetables and meat. He did, however, experiment with rationing foods, and researched the problems with tea drinking. Approximately two decades later, he listed several reasons, which he would repeat to friends, upon his changing to a strictly vegetable diet. Some of these reasons were, that "ten of us can live where one flesh-eater pure and simple must starve," because "homo sapiens are closest to fruit-eating apes rather than flesh-eating beasts of prey," and that "fruit and seeds uproot the drink crave." He also noted that he has derived inspiration for this diet from the "sages [of] earlier epochs," such as Pythagoras, Socrates, Plato, Epicurus, Masinissa, Plutarch, Seneca, Musonius, Clement, Chrysostom, Bernard, Cyrus, Decius, Fabricicuis, and General Gordon.

Mayor became a member of the Vegetarian Society in 1881, and as British academic Hugh Fraser Stewart writes, "to its great advantage and his own." He became the President of the Vegetarian Society in 1883. Many of Mayor's vegetarian writings were published in the book, Plain Living and High Thinking in 1897. Mayor died in 1910, in Cambridge.

=== Address ===
Mayor delivered the address "What is Vegetarianism?" before the Vegetarian Society, at its annual meeting, in Manchester, on October 14, 1885. At the time of the meeting, Mayor was a professor of Latin, and a Senior Fellow of St. John's College, in Cambridge.

== Publication ==
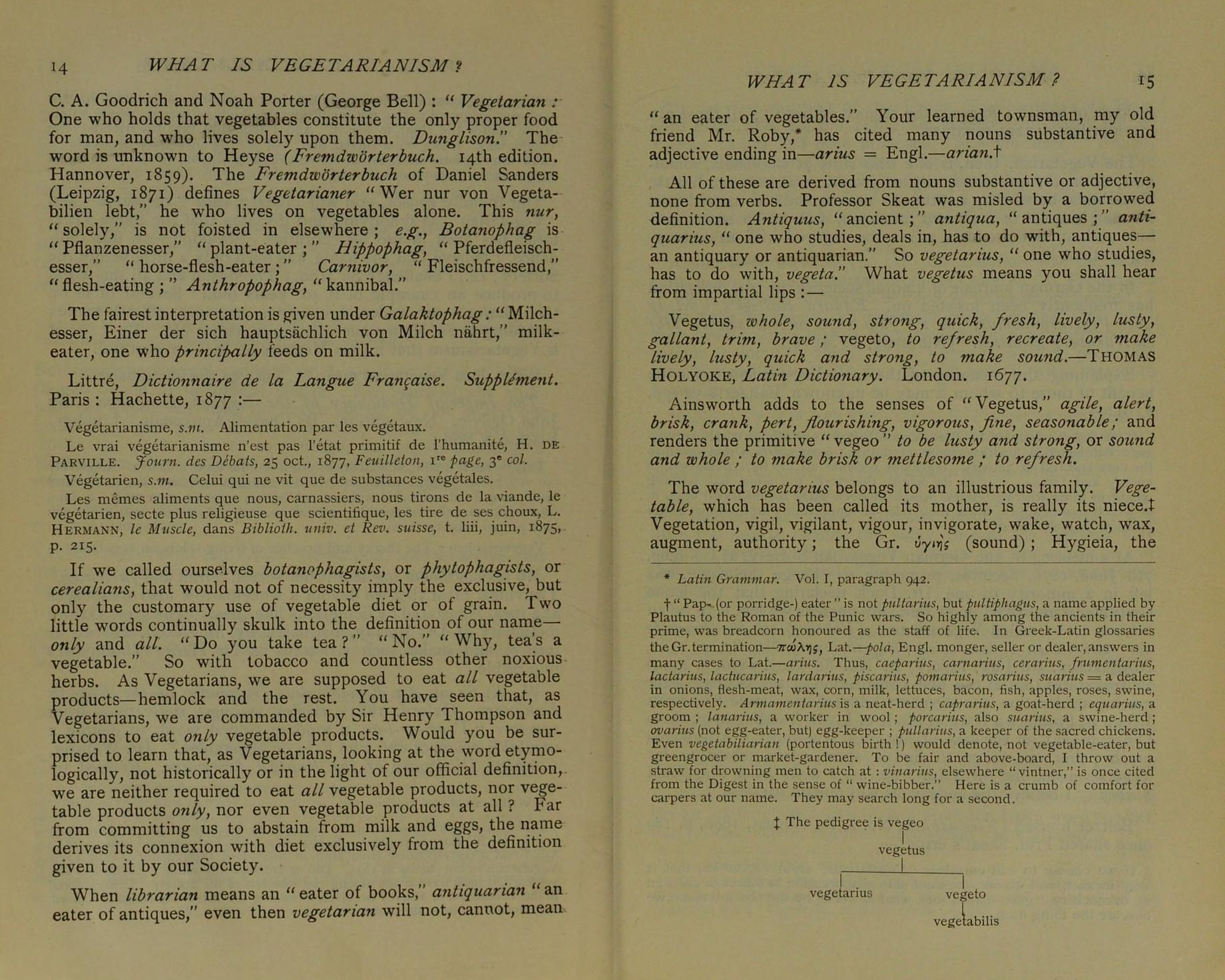
Third edition, with notes

An early edition of What Is Vegetarianism? was printed at Manchester, by the Vegetarian Society, in 1886.

The third edition, which was published in 1889, is 16 pages in total length, and printed in a demy octavo collation. "What is Vegetarianism?" appears within a collection of Mayor's writings, entitled Plain Living and High Thinking, which was published in 1897. In the same year, it was split into two editions of the monthly periodical The Vegetarian, the first half of the essay appearing in the 15 July edition, and the second half in the 15 August edition.

A revised and englarged version of the third edition, which is 22 pages long and printed in a demy octavo collation, was published in 1898, by the Vegetarian Society, at 19 Oxford Street, in Manchester, London. It was 22 x 13 cm, and the cost was one penny. This version contains twenty notes, which includes a diagram, as well as fancy font.

Editions of What Is Vegetarianism? are held at public and university libraries in England and Scotland.

== Content ==
Notes and Queries entry for Vegetarianism, which quotes Mayor's work

Mayor opens "What is Vegetarianism?" by referencing British surgeon and polymath Sir Henry Thompson's assertions from 1879 editions of Nineteenth Century, on the vegetable diet, the land maintenance to support it, when compared to one which utilizes meat. He then proposes to investigate

I.—The profession and practice of Vegetarians in regard to the consumption of animal products, i.e., milk with butter and cheese; eggs, honey.

II.—The profession of a Greek and a Roman—Pythagoras and Musonius—to whom no one denies the name Vegetarians.

III.—The physical distinction between flesh and animal products, as attested by the low or antiphlogistic regimen of the medical faculty.

IV.—The moral distinction between the same, as attested by church rules of fasting.

V.—The origin and meaning of the word Vegetarian, considered philologically.

Addressing the use of the word vegetarian, Mayor writes that if "we called ourselves botanophagists, or phytophagists, or cerealians, that would not of necessity imply the exclusive, but only the customary use of vegetable diet or of grain. Two little words continually skulk into the definition of our name—only and all," adding that when "librarian means an "eater of books," antiquarian "an eater of antiques," even then vegetarian will not, cannot, mean "an eater of vegetables.""

This is discussed by the English librarian and vegetarian activist William E. A. Axon, in the weekly academic periodical Notes and Queries, who wrote that "those interested will find in this address a further discussion of the subject by both English and German writers," adding that "it may be well to add that the word "vegetarian" came into vogue with the establishment of the Vegetarian Society in 1847, and has not been traced further back than 1845." Axon offers for any interested readers who wish to know more about vegetarianism to "send me a postcard," at 257, Deansgate, Manchester, and "I shall be happy to send them some information on the matter."

In 1886 work Juvenal, which is a supplement to the poems of Latin author Juvenal, Mayor notes that he has "corrected Sir Henry's error, shared by Prof. Skeat and other lexicographers, as to the origin and meaning of the term Vegetarianism. It also occurs in Ed. v. Hartmann's attack on Vegetarianism ('was sollen wir essen?' in his 'Moderne Probleme' Leipz. 1886, p. 15).

At the end of the work, is an advertisement by the Vegetarian Society for two other works by Mayor, Plain Living and High Thinking, for one shilling, and Mercy not Curiosity, the Mother of Medicine, for one penny.

=== Reception ===
In an article entitled "What is Vegetarianism" in the February 1, 1910 edition of the periodical Good Health, the author writes that there "appear[s] to be a number of misapprehensions concerning [the vegetarian diet]." They write "in a few words, it mean wholesome living," quoting Mayor in that the word is a derivative of the Latin vegeo, which means to thrive and be strong. He closes with remarking that the word vegetable is a reference to plant foods because "the plant is conceived as giving life power."
