= The Clapton Press =

London-based publishing company

The Clapton Press is an independent publisher based in London E5, established in 2018.

== Memories of Spain ==
Although its publication list is not restricted to any particular theme, The Clapton Press has a strong interest in Spain and Latin America. This is reflected in the Memories of Spain series of previously unpublished or out of print memoirs, written mainly by English-speaking individuals with direct experience of living in Spain during the 1930s. They engaged in a variety of occupations, as journalists, nurses, volunteer fighters and stretcher bearers with the International Brigades. Authors include Esmond Romilly, Inez Pearn, Sir Peter Chalmers Mitchell, Kate Mangan, F G Tinker jr, Arturo Barea and Frida Stewart. Many of these publications have been produced in collaboration with leading historians specialising in modern Spanish history and, in particular, the Second Republic and the Spanish Civil War, as well as other related historical research. Contributors include Paul Preston, Angela Jackson, Richard Baxell, Soledad Fox Maura, Jim Jump, William Chislett and Boris Volodarsky.

== Spanish Modern Classics ==
This series focusses on literary works by contemporary Spanish authors which The Clapton Press considers as modern classics but which have been overlooked by more mainstream publishers of literature in translation.

== Tales from the Southern Cone ==
The Press is also developing a series of previously untranslated works from Argentina, Chile and Uruguay, with the support of Programa Sur, DIRAC and IDA.

== Cuba ==
The Press has recently republished What One Man Saw, Being the Personal Impressions of a War Correspondent in Cuba by H. Irving Hancock, recounting the author's experiences as an embedded journalist with the US forces that landed in Cuba during their war of independence against Spain in 1898; and Wild Green Oranges by Bob Baldock, an autobiographical novel based on the author's experiences fighting in Cuba in 1958 alongside Fidel Castro and Che Guevara.

== Publications ==
=== Memories of Spain ===
- Perfidious Albion: Britain and the Spanish Civil War by Paul Preston.
- Forged in Spain by Richard Baxell.
- The Bones in the Forest by Michael Eaude.
- Remembering Spain: Essays, Memoirs and Poems on the International Brigades and the Spanish Civil War (from the pages of the magazine of the International Brigade Memorial Trust) ed. Joshua Newmark.
- Hotel in Spain and Hotel in Flight by Nancy Johnstone (two separate volumes).
- Behind the Spanish Barricades by John Langdon-Davies with a prologue by Paul Preston.
- The Last Mile to Huesca: an Australian Nurse in the Spanish Civil (the diary of Agnes Hodgson) by Judith Keene.
- Never More Alive: Inside the Spanish Republic by Kate Mangan, with a preface by Paul Preston.
- The Good Comrade: Memoirs of Jan Kurzke, with a preface by Richard Baxell.
- Firing a Shot For Freedom by Frida Stewart, with a foreword by Angela Jackson.
- In Place of Splendour by Constancia de la Mora, with a preface by Soledad Fox Maura.
- Some Still Live by F G Tinker jr.
- Struggle for the Spanish Soul and Spain in the Post War World, by Arturo & Ilsa Barea, with a preface by William Chislett.
- My House in Málaga by Sir Peter Chalmers Mitchell.
- British Women and the Spanish Civil War by Angela Jackson (2020 edition).
- The Fighter Fell in Love by James R Jump, with a foreword by Paul Preston and a preface by Jack Jones.
- Boadilla by Esmond Romilly.
- Spanish Portrait by Elizabeth Lake.
- Single to Spain & Escape from Disaster by Keith Scott Watson.
- Hampshire Heroes by Alan Lloyd.
- The Tilting Planet poems by David Marsh.

=== Spanish Modern Classics ===
- The Alligator's Trap (El sueño dl caimán) by Antonio Soler (English translation).
- Soldiers in the Fog (El nombre que ahora digo) by Antonio Soler (English translation).
- The Clairvoyant: the man who predicted Hitler's rise to power (El mentalista) by Gervasio Posadas (English translation).
- The Gap Year (El año de Gracia) by Cristina Fernández Cubas (English translation).
- Yerma by Federico García Lorca (English translation).

=== Tales from Latin America ===
- Soledad by Eduardo Acevedo Díaz (English translation).
- What One Man Saw, Being the Personal Impressions of a War Correspondent in Cuba by H. Irving Hancock, 1898.
- Rough Notes, taken during some rapid journeys across the Pampas and among the Andes by Captain Francis Bond Head, 1826.
- Wild Green Oranges by Bob Baldock.
- Sombreros are Becoming by Nancy Johnstone.
- Brutal Tales by Ernesto Herrera (English translation).
- Su majestad el hambre: cuentos brutales by Ernesto Herrera (Original Spanish version).
- The Yocci Well by Juana Manuela Gorriti (English translation).
- Our Native Land by Juana Manuela Gorriti (English translation).
- La tierra natal by Juana Manuela Gorriti (Original Spanish version).
- Oasis en la vida by Juana Manuela Gorriti (Original Spanish version).
- Mysteries of the River Plate by Juana Manso de Noronha (English translation).
- Los misterios del Plata by Juana Manso de Noronha (Original Spanish version).
- Lucía Miranda by Rosa Guerra (Original Spanish version).

=== Miscellaneous ===
- Dawn Escape by Frida Stewart.
- Marguerite Reilly by Elizabeth Lake.
- Love Struck: Five Centuries of Romantic Verse, ed. George Lake.
- The Rime of the Ancyent Marinere and a Few Other Poems by Samuel Taylor Coleridge.
