= Antonio Soler (novelist) =

Spanish writer and novelist

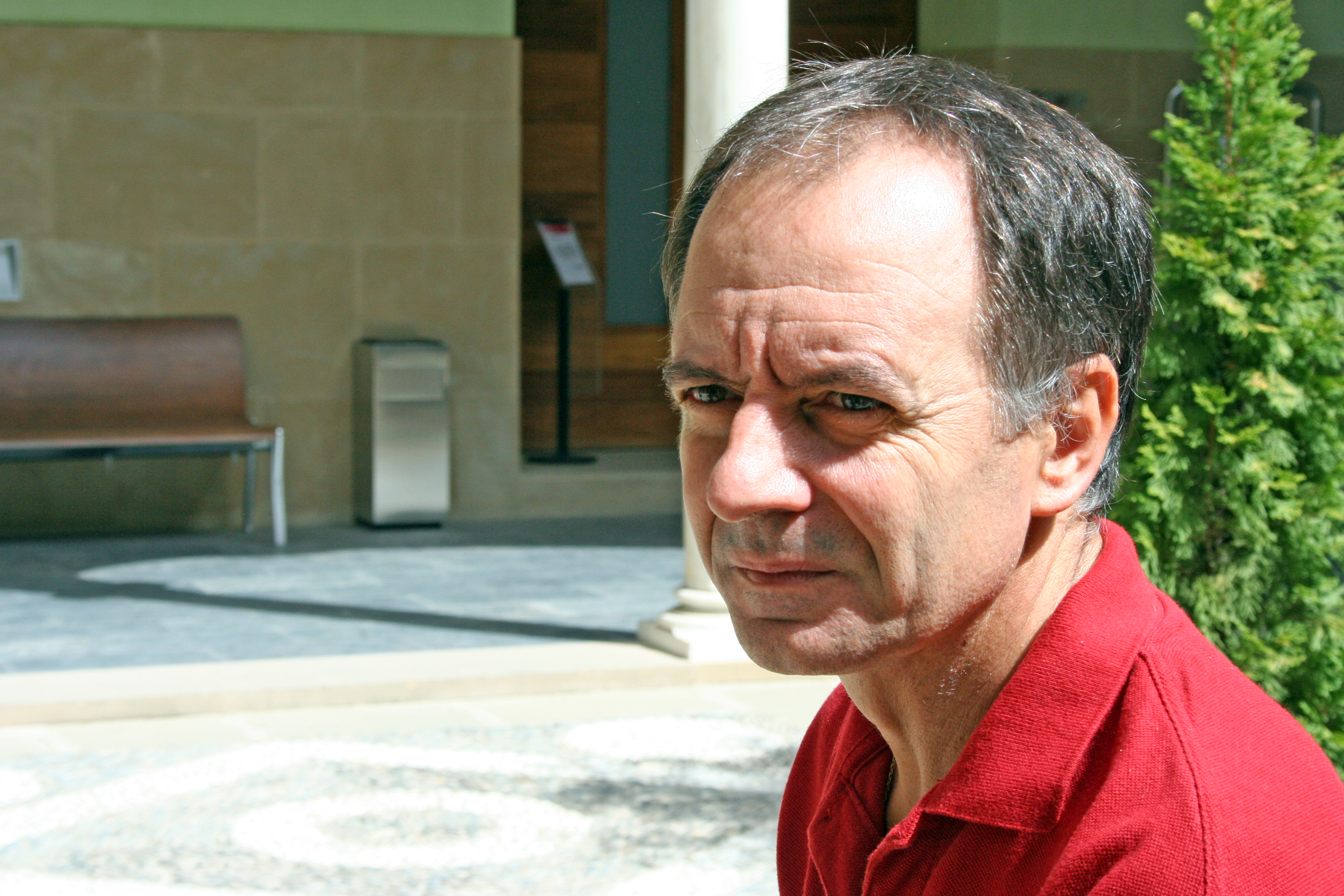
- Born: September 28, 1956 (age 69); Málaga, Spain
- Occupations: Novelist, screenwriter, journalist
- Writing career
- Language: Spanish
- Notable awards: Jauja Prize (1983); Premio Herralde (1996)

Antonio Soler (born Málaga, 28 September 1956) is a Spanish novelist, screenwriter and journalist.

== Biography ==
In 1983, Soler won the Jauja prize for short stories with Muerte canina (A Dog’s Death). His career as a writer was definitively launched in 1992 with the publication of Extranjeros en la noche (Strangers in the Night), a collection of short stories and a novella – La noche (The Night), which was later published as a separate book.

After a further two novels he published Las bailarinas muertas (The Dead Dancing Girls), winning the Premio Herralde and establishing his reputation as a key exponent of modern Spanish narrative. His following novel, El nombre que ahora digo (Soldiers in the Fog), is considered by some as one of the best depictions of life in the Republican sector during the Spanish conflict. In an article in El Pais in 2014, Professor Paul Preston is quoted as saying, "I don't like reading novels about the Civil War, but an exception was Soldiers in the Fog, written by Antonio Soler some twenty years ago, which blew me away." ("Prefiero no leer novelas de la Guerra Civil, aunque como excepción me chifló una de Antonio Soler de hará unos veinte años: El nombre que ahora digo.") He has repeated the sentiment more recently in seminars at the Cañada Blanch Centre (LSE), commenting that it is one of the few novels to capture the sense of confusion and disorder prevailing during the siege of Madrid.

El camino de los Ingleses (Summer Rain), published in 2004, was made into a film in 2006 by Antonio Banderas using Soler's own filmscript.

Soler's novel Sur (2018) describes one day in the life of the city of Málaga through a cast of some 250 characters, as they endure the oppressive heat of the terral wind. has been published under same title by Peter Owen Publishers/Pushkin Press, 2023. The principal narrative thread revolves around a moribund body discovered early in the morning on a patch of waste ground. The body is being consumed by ants. We learn that it belongs to a lawyer, Dionisio. His story is related in a number of flashbacks, some from his own perspective and others from the perspective of his wife, Ana. There are many more sub-threads and characters which combine to weave the social fabric of the city, but although their lives are intertwined in a complicated network, for the most part the characters are each wrapped up in their own separate worlds, isolated by their inability to communicate with each other. This contrasts starkly with the world of the ants, working together in harmony in pursuit of a collective goal.

Soler was writer in residence at Dickinson College, Pennsylvania, and has given courses and lectures at numerous universities and cultural institutions in Europe, Latin America, the US and Canada. He is a founder member of the Order of Finnegans, a literary group created in honour of James Joyce's novel Ulysses, which takes its name from a pub in Dalkey, Ireland. The other four founding members are Eduardo Lago, Jordi Soler, Enrique Vila-Matas and Malcolm Otero Barral.

== Bibliography ==
=== Short stories ===
- 1992 - Extranjeros en la noche (Strangers in the Night), including the novella La Noche (The Night).

=== Novels ===
- 1993 - Modelo de pasión (Model of Passion). Premio Andalucía de Novela.
- 1995 - Los héroes de la frontera (Heroes of the Frontier). Premio Andalucía de la Crítica.
- 1996 - Las bailarinas muertas (The Dead Dancing Girls). Premio Herralde and Premio de la Crítica.
- 1999 - El nombre que ahora digo (Soldiers in the Fog). Premio Primavera.
- 2001 - El espiritista melancólico (The Melancholy Spiritualist).
- 2004 - El camino de los ingleses (Summer Rain). Premio Nadal.
- 2006 - El sueño del caimán (The Alligator's Trap) [Revised 2022].
- 2010 - Lausana (Lausanne).
- 2012 - Boabdil.
- 2013 - Una historia violenta (A Violent History).
- 2016 - Apóstoles y asesinos (Apostles and Assassins).
- 2018 - Sur. Premio Narrativa Juan Goytisolo; Premio Francisco Umbral; Premio Andalucía de la Crítica; Premio El Público de Canal Sud Radio y Televisión; Premio Literario Casa Leopoldo; Premio Nacional de la Crítica
- 2021 - Sacramento (Sacrament).
- 2023 - Yo que fui un perro.

=== Essays ===
- 2010 - Málaga, Paraíso Perdido (Málaga, Paradise Lost).

== Translations ==
Into English: Into English:

- Sur (Sur), translated by Kathryn Phillips-Miles & Simon Deefholts, Peter Owen/Pushkin Press, London, 2023. Long-listed for the Oxford-Weidenfeld translation prize 2024.
- Soldiers in the Fog (El nombre que ahora digo), translated by Kathryn Phillips-Miles & Simon Deefholts, The Clapton Press, London, 2023.
- The Alligator's Trap (El sueño del caimán), translated by Kathryn Phillips-Miles & Simon Deefholts, The Clapton Press, London, 2024.

Several of his novels have been translated into a number of other languages, including German, Greek, French, Italian, Portuguese, Rumanian, Lithuanian, Croatian and Korean.
