= Gervasio Posadas Mañé =

Uruguayan novelist

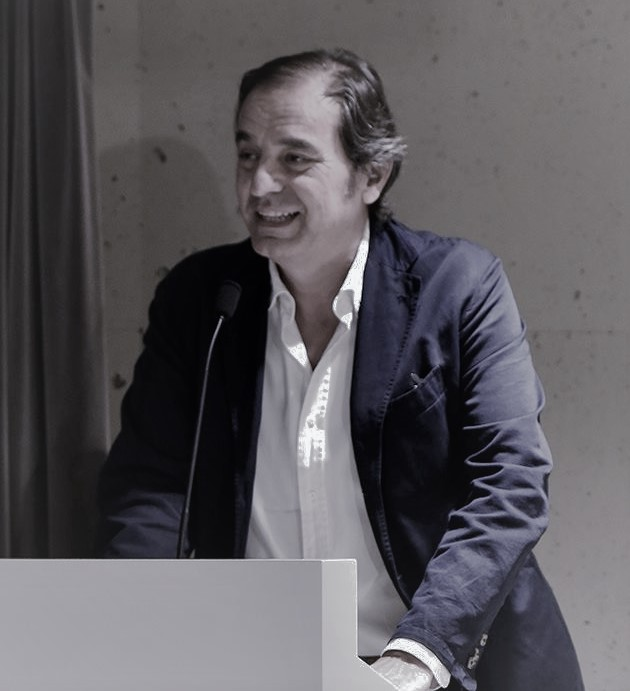
Gervasio Mañé

Gervasio Posadas Mañé, more widely known as Gervasio Posadas, is a prize-winning novelist, born in Uruguay and currently resident in Spain.

== Biography ==
Gervasio Posadas was born in Montevideo in 1962, the son of an Uruguayan diplomat. He and his three siblings spent their childhood travelling between diplomatic missions in the USSR, Argentina and the United Kingdom, eventually taking up residence in Spain. He worked for several multinational companies as a marketing specialist before dedicating himself to writing on a full-time basis. He published his first novel El secreto del gazpacho (The Secret of Gazpacho), a lampoon of self-improvement manuals, in 2007, with a further six to follow, including Niki Zas y el retrete nuclear (Niki Zas and the Radioactive WC) – a novel for children – and La venganza es dulce y además no engorda (Vengeance is Sweet and Won’t Make You Fat), which was included in the New Spanish Books 2009 shortlist of books recommended for translation into English.

El mentalista de Hitler (Hitler’s Clairvoyant), published in May 2016, is based on the true story of Erik Jan Hanussen, who predicted Hitler’s rise to power in the early 1930s. According to the Spanish writer Juan Eslava Galán, “it’s a splendid novel, that reveals a little-known side of Nazi Germany.” His latest novel, El mercader de la muerte (Merchant of Death) is centred around the enigmatic figure of Basil Zaharoff, an international gun-runner who was particularly active in the 1930s. It has been described by the novelist Lorenzo Silva as "A crude life journey, from Constantinople to Montecarlo, narrated with rare elegance and which reads like one of the best-written mystery stories."

Posadas is the brother of the writer Carmen Posadas, with whom he jointly wrote Hoy caviar, mañana sardinas (Caviar Today, Sardines Tomorrow), which won the Premio Sent Sovi for Gastronomic Literature in 2008 and the Prix Eugénie Brazier for Best Gastronomic Novel in 2014.

Posadas writes a blog for the Spanish edition of the Huffington Post.

== Bibliography ==
=== In Spanish ===
- El secreto del gazpacho (The Secret of Gazpacho). Siruela. 2007. ISBN 978-8498410488.
- Hoy caviar, mañana sardinas (Caviar today, Sardines Tomorrow) in collaboration with Carmen Posadas. RBA Libros. 2008. ISBN 978-8498670578.
- Doctor Mateo. Espasa Narrativa. 2009. ISBN 978-8467031997.
- La venganza es dulce y además no engorda (Vengeance is Sweet and Won’t Make You Fat). Espasa Libros. 2009. ISBN 978-8467031713.
- Pájaros de papel (Paper Birds). Espasa Libros. 2010. ISBN 978-8467032826.
- Niki Zas y el retrete núclear (Niki Zas and the Radioactive WC). Editorial Edebé. 2013. ISBN 978-8468308319.
- El mentalista de Hitler (The Clairvoyant). Editorial Suma de Letras, Spain. 2016. ISBN 978-8483658734.
- El mercader de la muerte (The Death Merchant). Editorial Suma de Letras, Spain. 2020. ISBN 978-8491293606.

=== In translation ===
- The Clairvoyant: The Man Who Predicted Hitler's Rise to Power (in English, translated by Kathryn Phillips-Miles and Simon Deefholts). The Clapton Press, June 2023. ISBN 978-1913693299
- Aujourd’hui Caviar, Demain Sardines (in French, translated by Pilar Luque). Éditions de l’Épure. 2015. ISBN 978-2352552420.
- Mentalista Hitlera (in Polish, translated by Agata Ostrowska). Ed. Rebis. 2017. ISBN 978-8380621961.
- Il Segreto del Gazpacho (in Italian, translated by Fabiana Marconi). Amazon Media EU SARL. 2008. ASIN B00CP3D7FA.
- Ο πνευματιστής του Χίτλερ (in Greek, translated by Αγγελική Βασιλάκου). Μεταίχμιο. 2017. ISBN 978-6180310993

== Awards ==
- Premio Sent Sovi for Best Gastronomic Literature, 2008.
- Prix Eugénie Brazier for Best Gastronomic Novel, 2014.
