= Sherry Mangan =

American writer, journalist, translator, editor and book designer

- Born: John Joseph Sherry Mangan; 27 June 1904; Lynn, Massachusetts, US
- Died: 24 June 1961 (aged 56); Rome, Italy
- Education: Harvard University (BA)
- Occupations: Journalist, Novelist, Poet, Political Activist, Marxist

Sherry Mangan (born John Joseph Sherry Mangan; 27 June 1904 – 24 June 1961) was an American writer, journalist, translator, editor, and book designer. He was a Marxist political activist in the Trotskyist movement from 1935 to 1961. During the Nazi occupation of Paris he was actively associated with left-wing underground operations.

== Background ==
Sherry Mangan was born to Irish-Catholic parents on 27 July 27, 1904, in Lynn, Massachusetts. He graduated from Harvard University in 1925 in classical literature.

== Career ==
In the 1930s itself he was popular for his literary acumen.

He became a Trotskyist and got into the US Socialist Party. He took interest as member of the Socialist Workers Party from the time it came to be established in 1938.

Soon after he moved to Paris, under the influence of several expatriates he became a writer and editor on French surrealism. As editor he worked for Larus: The Celestial Visitor (1927-1928) and Pagany: A Native Quarterly (1930-1933). He then came under the influence of French modernism and also diversified his interests to writing novels, poetry and fiction; some of his notable works are Cinderella Married (1932), Salutation to Valediction (1938) and No Apology for Poetrie and other Poems written 1922-1931 (1934).

He pursued his deep interest in Marxism and as a Trotskyist was actively engaged in the promotion of the French section of the International Federation of Independent Revolutionary Art. He also wrote articles under the pseudonym of Sean Niall for the Partisan Review. He also published articles regularly on French affairs in the newspaper of the Socialist Workers Party.

== Later life ==
During the period from 1938 to 1948 he worked as a journalist and contributed on themes related to the social, cultural and political events to magazines like Time, Life and Fortune. In 1940, William Saroyan lists him among "contributing editors" at Time in the play, Love's Old Sweet Song. His notable contribution in the 16 September issue of Life was on "Paris Under the Swastika".

His contributions in short fiction and poetry were brought out in magazines such as Esquire, London Mercury, Harper's, Atlantic Monthly, New Directions, and Black Mountain Review. He functioned as Secretary for the International Secretariat of the Fourth International from July 1939.

He then moved his base from Paris to Latin America in the early 1940s and pursued his journalistic career. At the same time he promoted his activity with Trotskyist organizations; one such organization was the Fourth International. During the German occupation of France he was asked to quit France.

During the Second World War he represented the Fourth International and tried, though unsuccessfully, to interact with Argentina, Britain and Greece; for a short period he was also International Secretary of the Fourth International Organization. Also, in the early 1950s, he went to Bolivia when the Trotskyist movement was divided in 1953; he then sided with Michel Raptis, the then International Secretary of the movement.

His return in 1953 to the US, his homeland, did not augur well for him, as his Marxist ideology was not acceptable to the House Un-American Activities Committee. His career took a downward trend and he did not keep good health. For some time he was a freelance editor and was involved in translation of Mozart's Idomeneo, King of Crete, 1955.

== Personal and death ==
In 1931 Sherry married Katharine Prideaux Foster (subsequently known as Kate Mangan), whom he had met in Paris in 1924. They separated in 1934 and divorced the following year. He died in 1961 in Rome, Italy in penurious conditions, and almost unsung.
