= Frida Knight =

English communist activist and writer

Frida Knight (1910–1996) was an English communist activist and author.

== Life ==
Born Frideswide Frances Emma Stewart, and known as Frida, she was the daughter of Hugh Fraser Stewart (1863–1948) and his wife Jessie Graham Crum; her sister Caitin (Katherine) married George Derwent Thomson, and her brother Ludovic married Alice Mary Naish. She left school at 14 with a heart condition, and spent time in Italy.

A student of music and drama, Stewart went with one of her sisters to Germany in 1928, studying the violin, and then went to the Royal College of Music. She spent time at the Manchester University Settlement and Hull University College. In 1935 she visited the Soviet Union on a British Drama League trip.

Stewart then joined the Left Book Club and Communist Party of Great Britain, and formed local Spanish Aid committees on the outbreak of the Spanish Civil War. She drove an ambulance to Spain on behalf of the National Joint Committee for Spanish Relief. In 1937 she was at a hospital in Murcia with Kathleen MacColgan and Eunice Chapman.

Arrested in France in 1940, after the German invasion, Stewart was in the Caserne Vauban (Besançon) and then the Vittel internment camp. She escaped in 1942, with Rosemary Say. She then worked for the Free French in London.

In later life Frida Knight wrote, and campaigned for many causes.

== Works ==
- Dawn Escape, Everybody's Books (1943)
- The Strange Case of Thomas Walker, Lawrence & Wishart (1957)
- University Rebel: the life of William Frend (1757–1841), Littlehampton Book Services Ltd (1971)
- Beethoven and the Age of Revolution, International Publishers (1973)
- Letters to William Frend from the Reynolds family of Little Paxton and John Hammond of Fenstanton 1793–1814 (editor, 1974)
- The French Resistance, 1940 to 1944, Lawrence & Wishart, (1975) (First published in Marxism Today, December 1965)
- Cambridge Music: from the Middle Ages to modern times (1980)
- Firing a Shot for Freedom, the Memoirs of Frida Stewart, with a foreword and afterword by Angela Jackson, The Clapton Press (2020), ISBN 978-1-913693-00-8

She translated The Lost Letter and Other Plays by Ion Luca Caragiale (1956).

== Family ==
She married microbiologist Bert Cyril James Gabriel Knight in 1944 and had five children, of whom four survived infancy. The couple moved to Cambridge on Bert Knight's retirement and Knight remained there after being widowed in 1981.
