= Greville Texidor =

English writer

- Born: Margaret Greville Foster; 1902 Wolverhampton, England
- Died: 20 August 1964 (aged 61–62) Blue Mountains, Australia
- Occupation: Writer of short stories, novellas
- Literary movement: Existentialism
- Notable works: "Home Front," These Dark Glasses

Margaret Greville Foster (1902 — 20 August 1964), best known by her pen name Greville Texidor, was an English fiction writer, notable for her work written while living in New Zealand from 1940 to 1948.

After traveling the world as a performer and fighting alongside her husband for the Republicans in the Spanish Civil War, Texidor went into exile in New Zealand with her family during the early years of World War II, pushed out of England due to her husband's German background and the couple's radical politics.

In New Zealand, she began writing fiction and joined Auckland's literary community. Her short stories and novellas, compiled posthumously in the collection In Fifteen Minutes You Can Say a Lot: Selected Fiction, are considered an important contribution to the existentialist period in New Zealand's literary canon.

== Early life ==
Greville Texidor was born Margaret Greville Foster in 1902 in Wolverhampton, England.

After her father, William Arthur Foster, took his own life in 1919 amid a legal scandal, Margaret dropped out of school and moved to London to join the art world in Hampstead. She was joined by her mother, Editha Greville Prideaux Foster, and sister, Kate, who were both painters.

=== London life and world travel ===
In London, she began to work as a model and actress. In 1924, she appeared in the silent film Moonbeam Magic, playing the role of Miriam and credited as Margot Greville. She then toured Europe and the Americas as a chorus girl, picking up a contortionist boyfriend along the way.

Her frequent travels brought her into contact with a variety of interesting men, and she was married three times: to a Brit, a Spaniard, and a German. Her first marriage ended after only two weeks.

=== Spanish Civil War ===
In Buenos Aires, 1929, Greville Foster married her second husband, Manuel Maria Texidor i Catasus—referred to by biographers as "the Spaniard"—and they had a daughter, Cristina. The family moved back to Spain, where they lived in Barcelona and Tossa de Mar. While in Tossa de Mar, Greville had an affair with a teacher, the German Werner Otto Droescher. Greville asked Manuel Texidor for a divorce and later married Werner, while keeping the Texidor surname. Greville and Werner fought on the side of the Republicans in the Spanish Civil War. Her sister Kate (now known as Kate Mangan) also came to Spain during this period and worked for the Republican Foreign Press Office under Constancia de la Mora.

Both in Spain and back in England, Texidor and her husband worked to help resettle Spanish and German refugees.

== New Zealand years (1940–1948) ==
In 1940, Texidor moved to New Zealand along with Droescher, her sister, and her mother, who had grown up in New Zealand. After Texidor and Droescher had returned to England from Spain, his German background and the couple's anarchist politics had pushed the family to the margins of World War II-era British society; Texidor spent a month in prison in this period. Classified as "wartime enemy aliens," the family traveled to start a new life in New Zealand.

During her time there, Texidor lived in Auckland, the Northland Peninsula, and on the North Shore. While living in New Zealand, in 1947, she had a second daughter, Rosamund, with Droescher.

=== Writing ===
Once in New Zealand, Texidor began writing fiction for the first time in her life.

She became deeply involved in Auckland's literary scene at the time, receiving mentorship from the writer Frank Sargeson, who would go on to include her in his 1945 anthology Speaking for Ourselves. Her relationships with members of the scene weren't always collaborative, however, and on one occasion she held a knife to the throat of the poet and publisher Denis Glover.

She began to print her works of short fiction in publications across New Zealand, Australia, and England, including the Anvil and Here & Now. Her 1942 story "Home Front" was her first work to be published in New Zealand; it has gone on to be widely anthologized.

Her first book, the novella These Dark Glasses, was written during her time in New Zealand but published in 1949, after she left the country. These Dark Glasses deals with a communist writer who had been helping the Republicans in Spain, as she grows disillusioned with the intellectual scene of Southern France. In the novella, Texidor envisions "existentialist symbols of hopeless struggle to climb insurmountable barriers."

In her work, Texidor brought a critical, cosmopolitan eye to New Zealand's society of the period, which she found provincial. Her work is characterized as part of New Zealand's existential literary movement. Critics describe her writing as demonstrating a "hypersensitivity to desolation," and her stories are populated with "damaged characters [who] are beyond learning or teaching."

In addition to her own writing, Texidor translated Spanish literature into English, including poems by Federico García Lorca.

== Death and legacy ==
Texidor left New Zealand for Australia in 1948, and in 1954 she returned to Spain. When her marriage ended in 1961, she moved back to Australia, and she died by suicide outside of Sydney in August 1964.

Her stories and novellas were posthumously collected and published in 1987 as In Fifteen Minutes You Can Say a Lot: Selected Fiction. The collection was republished in 2019 as a Victoria University Press Classic.

While Texidor was British by birth, her work is most closely associated with New Zealand. Her papers are held at the University of Auckland Library, and her work is broadly considered part of New Zealand's literary canon.
