= Editha Greville Prideaux =

New Zealand woman artist

Editha Greville Foster
- Born: Editha Greville Prideaux; August 31, 1866
- Died: May 24, 1954 (aged 87)
- Style: oil painting and watercolours
- Spouse: William Arthur Foster
- Children: Greville Texidor

Editha Greville Foster (née Prideaux) (1866–1954) was a New Zealand artist, and mother to Greville Texidor.

== Biography ==
Editha Greville Prideaux was born on 31 August 1866 in Tiverton, Devon. She travelled widely with her parents and they settled in Auckland. She exhibited oil paintings with the Auckland Society of Arts from 1887 to 1895. In 1887, she exhibited: Study in an English Garden, and Rangitoto, from Cheltenham Beach, which was reproduced in the exhibition catalogue, and she was listed in several categories in the associated Prize List.

In 1888, she is listed as winning the junior medal for at the Auckland Free School of Art. In 1892, she exhibits a well-received still life at the Auckland Academy of Arts exhibition at Old Choral Hall. In 1893, she exhibited five paintings that were praised in the Auckland Society of Arts exhibition review: The Head of a Young Man, Old English Costume; Alsace; A Portrait of a Boy; In the Old Orchard and On the Kukahu, Canterbury. In addition to her exhibiting in Auckland, she exhibited a painting titled Bulgarian Peasant at the New Zealand Academy of Fine Arts in 1892. In 1893, she exhibited two portraits at the New Zealand Academy of Fine Arts: Lady Augusta Boyle, Mrs. Bleazard, the latter of which was published in the exhibition catalogue, and another painting entitled Brunette.She also exhibited in the Canterbury Society of Arts in 1893 with Alsace, Young Man in old English Costume, and Girl in Mantilla.

In 1895, she travelled to London to study art. She, however, still contributed several pieces to the Auckland Society of Arts Exhibition to be displayed in her absence in the 1895 exhibition. On 2 August 1900, Prideaux married William Arthur Foster in Christ Church, Holborn, and they had two daughters. They lived at The Limes, Dudley Road, Sedgley.

While in the United Kingdom, she was friends with Augustus John and Mark Gertler. Stanley Spencer was also her neighbour for a short time while he was painting Resurrection, reportedly borrowing Foster's nightclothes for the women rising out of the graves.

After her husband's death in 1919, she returned to painting. Later, after the Second World War, she returned to New Zealand with her daughter Greville Texidor, a well known New Zealand writer.

She died in Homebush, New South Wales on 24 May 1954. Some of her illustrations are found in the archive of her daughter's work at the University of Auckland.
