= Eduardo Lago =

Spanish writer, novelist and translator

Eduardo Lago (born 16 June 1954) is a Spanish novelist, translator, and literary critic, born in Madrid and currently living in Manhattan, New York, United States. In 2002, he was the recipient of the Bartolomé March Award for Excellence in Literary Criticism for his critical comparison of three Spanish translations of James Joyce’s novel, Ulysses. In 2006, he won the Premio Nadal, Spain's oldest and most prestigious literary award, for his first novel, Llámame Brooklyn (Call Me Brooklyn). For many years, he interviewed North American writers for the literary supplement Babelia in the Spanish newspaper El País. He returned to teaching Spanish, Spanish literature, and European Literature at Sarah Lawrence College in Yonkers in 2011, after leaving in 2005 for the position of Director of the Cervantes Institute in New York.

He is a founding member of the Order of Finnegans, which takes its name from a pub in Dalkey, Ireland, although there are those who believe it also comes from James Joyce’s last novel, Finnegans Wake. The knights of the Order of Finnegans must venerate James Joyce’s novel Ulysses and, if possible, attend Bloomsday each year in Dublin on the sixteenth of June. This is a long day that culminates, at dusk, at the Martello tower in Sandycove (where the novel begins) with participants reading sections from Ulysses and then walking to Finnegans pub in the neighbouring village of Dalkey. The other four founding members are Enrique Vila-Matas, Jordi Soler, Antonio Soler and Malcolm Otero Barral.
