= William Carrick =

Scottish artist and photographer (1827–1878)

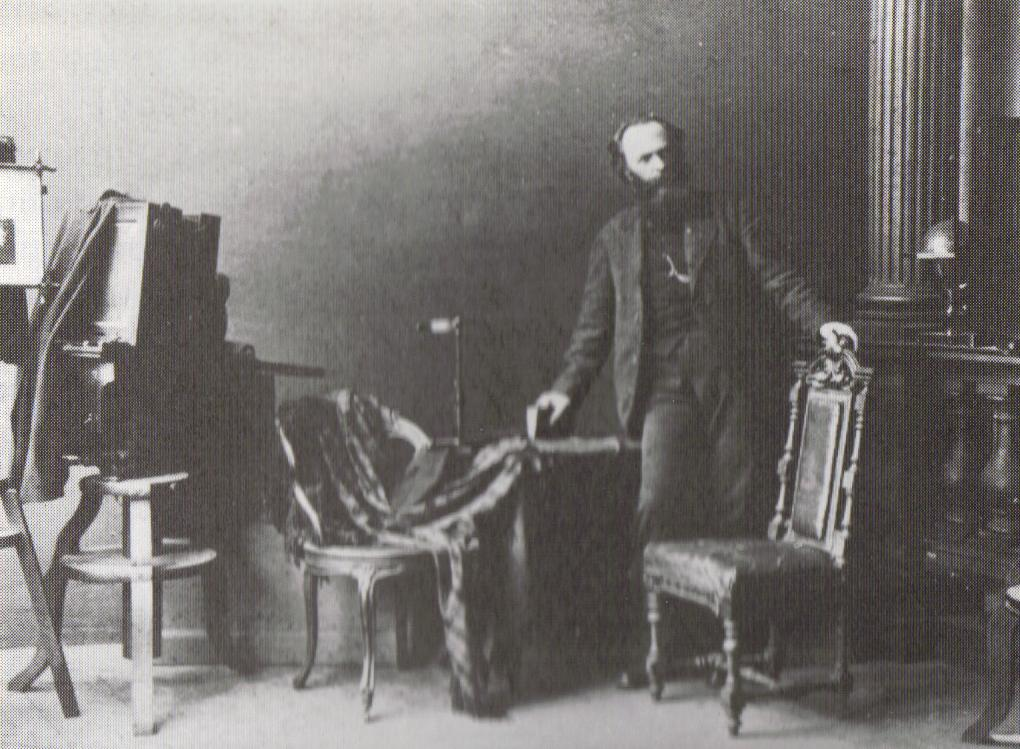
- William Carrick in his studio.
- Born: 31 December 1827; Edinburgh, Scotland
- Died: 11 November 1878 (aged 50); Saint Petersburg, Russia
- Education: Architecture, photography: Saint Petersburg, Rome, Edinburgh
- Known for: Photography
- Notable work: Peasant Characters from Simbirsk Province; Album of Russian Artists
- Movement: Peredvizhniki-related
- Patrons: Grand Duke Konstantine Nicholaievich of Russia

William Carrick (Russian: Вильям Андреевич Каррик, romanized: Vilyam Andreyevich Karrik; 31 December 1827 – 11 November 1878) was a Scottish-Russian artist and photographer.

== Early life and education ==
The son of a timber merchant, Andrew Carrick (died 1860), and Jessie (née Lauder), he was born in Edinburgh on 23 December 1827. Only a few weeks old, the Carrick family took William with them to the port of Kronstadt in the Gulf of Finland. Andrew had been trading with this port for some time, and the family would stay there for 16 years.

In 1844, the family moved to Saint Petersburg, where William became a student at the Saint Petersburg Academy of Arts, studying architecture under the renowned Alexander Brullov. By, 1853 he had completed his studies there, moving to Rome to undertake further studies. Although his family's business collapsed during the Crimean War, in 1856 William Carrick returned to Saint Petersburg to become a photographer. However, in the summer of the following year he departed for Edinburgh to gain more experience of photography. There he met the photographic technician John MacGregor.

== Career ==
In October, he returned to Russia, taking MacGregor with him in the aim of establishing a business and career. He opened a studio (or atelier) at 19 Malaya Morskaya Street, Saint Petersburg, making MacGregor his assistant. Carrick quickly made a name for himself capturing pictures of Russian life and pioneering Russian ethnographic photography, obtaining the patronage of Grand Duke Konstantine Nicholaievich of Russia. In 1862, Nicholas Alexandrovich, Tsesarevich of Russia ordered him a portrait, and was satisfied with it, therefore granted him with a diamond ring. In 1865, Count Mihaly Zichy hired Carrick to take pictures of his watercolours, in order to resell them as prints. Carrick did similar business with other artists, Ivan Kramskoi, Viktor Vasnetsov, and Nikolai Ge; after his death in 1879 many of these were published in his Album of Russian Artists.

Carrick and MacGregor made several rural expeditions, including in 1871 a monthlong trip to Simbirsk province. He amassed a large collection of photographs depicting the lives of Russian and Mordovian peasants. In 1872 his colleague MacGregor died, leaving Carrick in despair. Despite this, Carrick continued his work. In 1876, he became photographer of the Academy of Arts, obtaining a studio in the Academy for his photography. An exhibition of his works was held in the Russian capital in 1869, followed by exhibitions at London (1876) and Paris (1878), all to great acclaim.

Carrick died of pneumonia, at Saint Petersburg, on 11 November 1878. William Carrick was noted in Russia for his height, which was 6 foot and 4 inches. He had married once, to one Aleksandra Grigorievna Markelova (1832–1916), fathering by her two sons, Dmitry and Valery, whilst adopting her son Grigory from an earlier marriage. He trained Grigory as a photographer, while Valery went on to become a famous caricaturist. His wife Aleksandra, nicknamed Sashura, was a liberal and a nihilist, and for a time the only female journalist at the Peterburskie Vedomosti ("Saint Petersburg Times").

== Gallery ==
Some of Carrick's photographs:

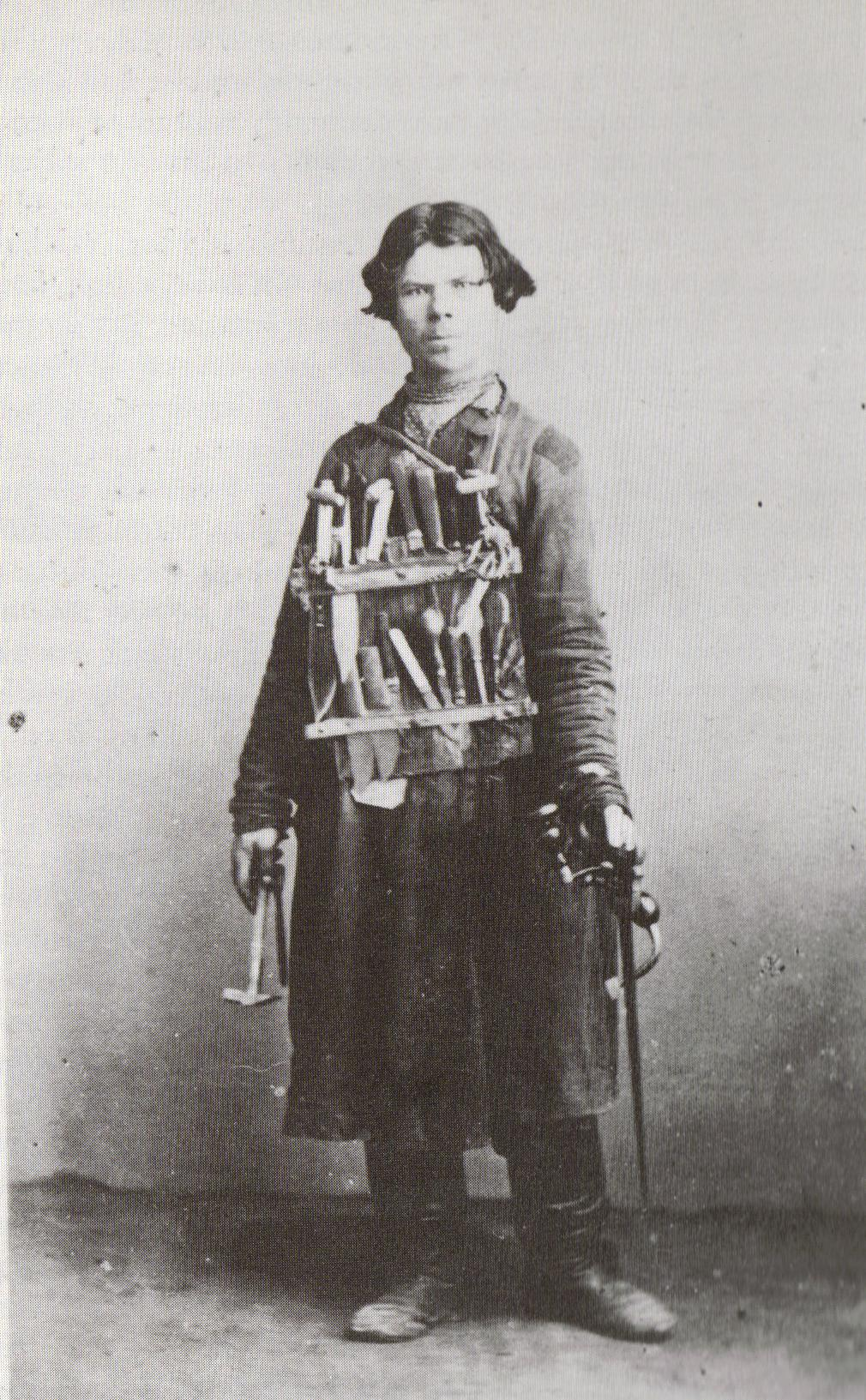

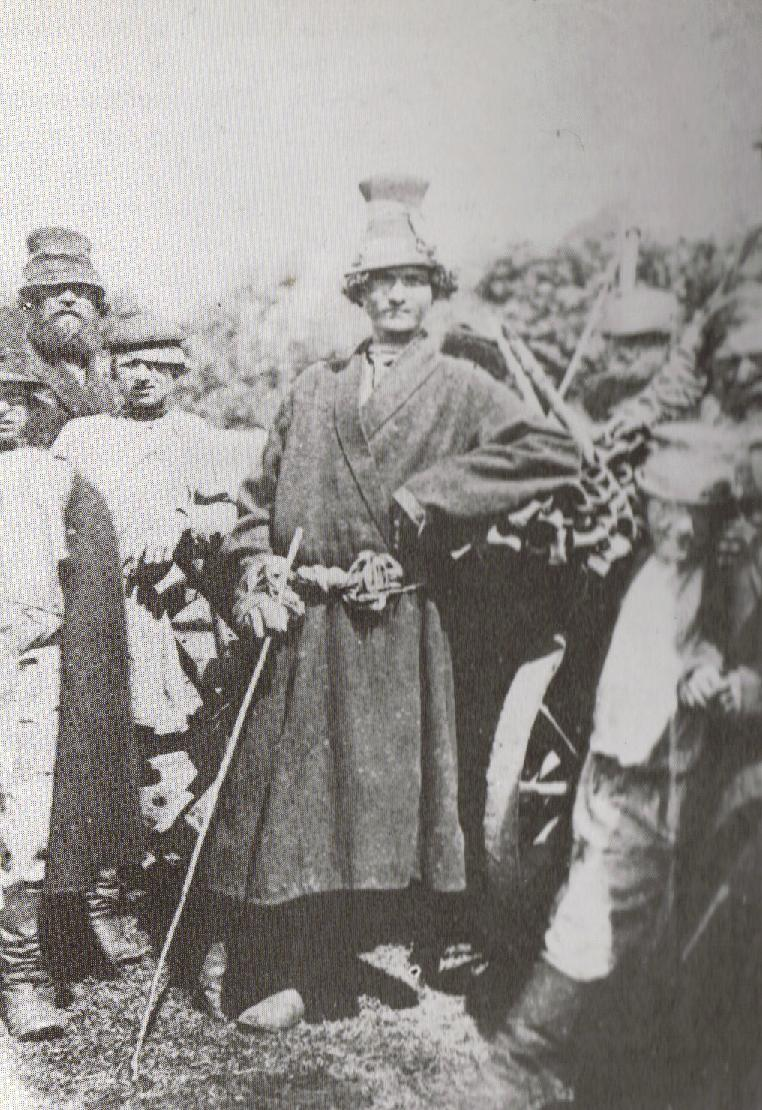

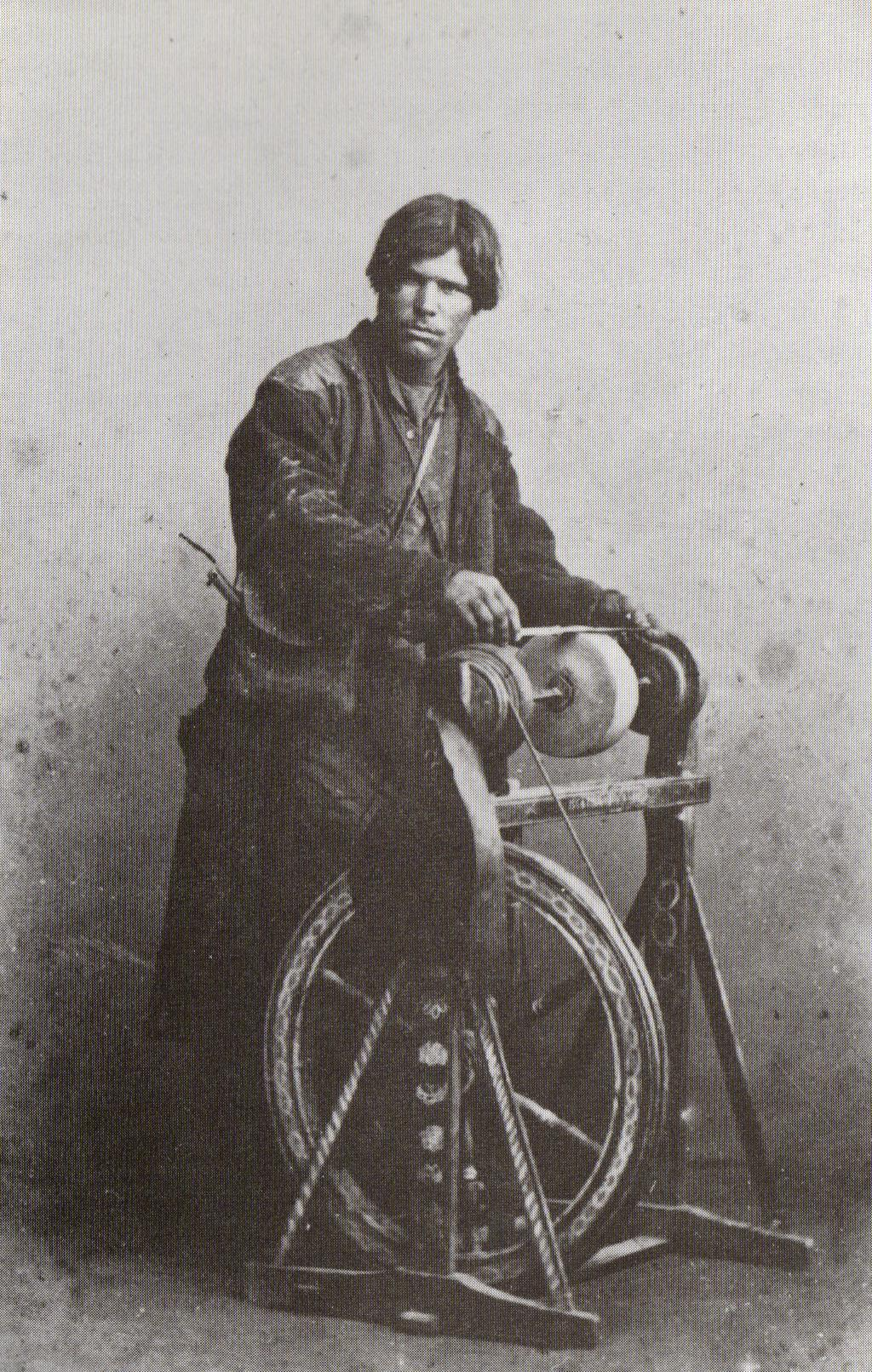

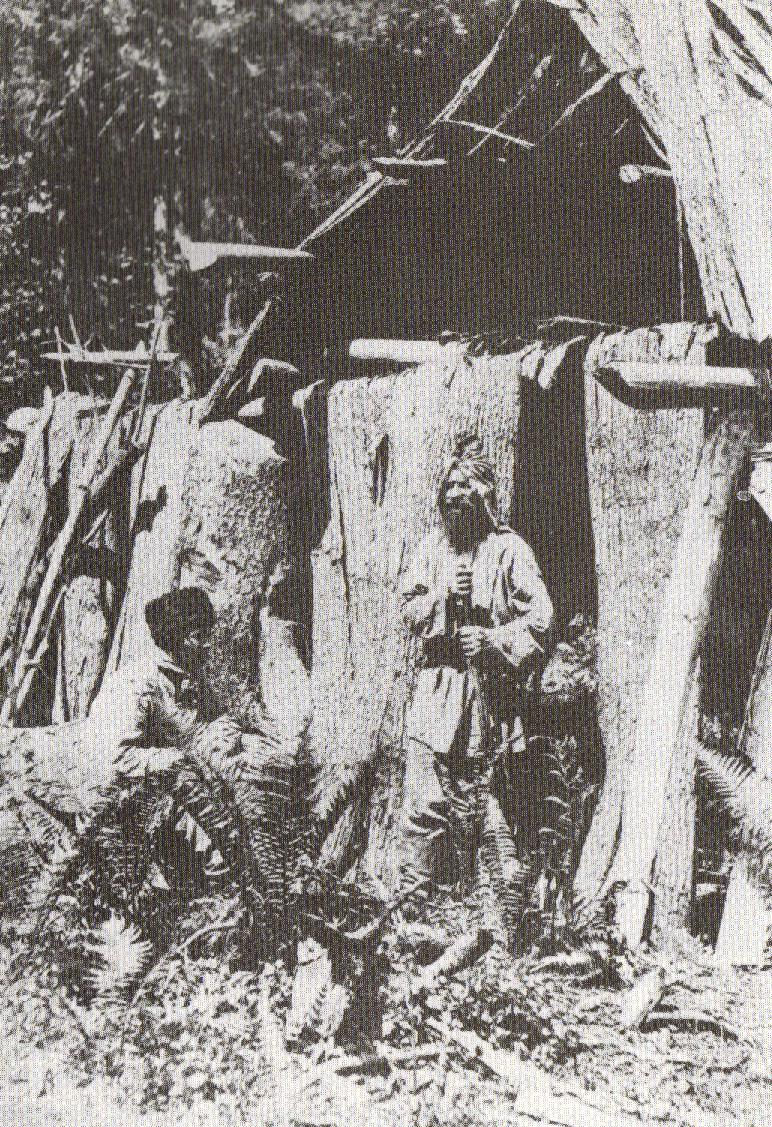
