= Hugh Fraser Stewart =

British academic, churchman and literary critic

Hugh Fraser Stewart (1863–1948) was a British academic, churchman and literary critic.

== Life ==
He was the second son of Ludovic(k) Charles Stewart, an army surgeon and son of Ludovick Stewart of Pityvaich, and Emma Ray or Rae. He was educated at Trinity College, Cambridge, from 1883, where he graduated B.A. in 1886. He then taught as an assistant master at Marlborough College, from 1889 to 1895, and as housemaster of C1 from 1893. He was ordained in 1894, and was vice-principal of Salisbury Theological College, from 1895 to 1899. He became chaplain of Trinity College in 1900, for a year.

Stewart was elected a Fellow and became Dean of St John's College, Cambridge, in 1907. A meeting at H. M. Chadwick's house in 1916, with Stewart and Arthur Quiller-Couch, was significant in the launching of the Cambridge English Tripos. Stewart moved to Trinity College in 1918, where he became Praelector in French.

In 1919 Stewart became a Fellow of Eton College, and in 1922 Reader in French.

Close to Paul Desjardins, whom he met through Jacques Raverat in 1913, Stewart took part at the meetings of the Décades de Pontigny.

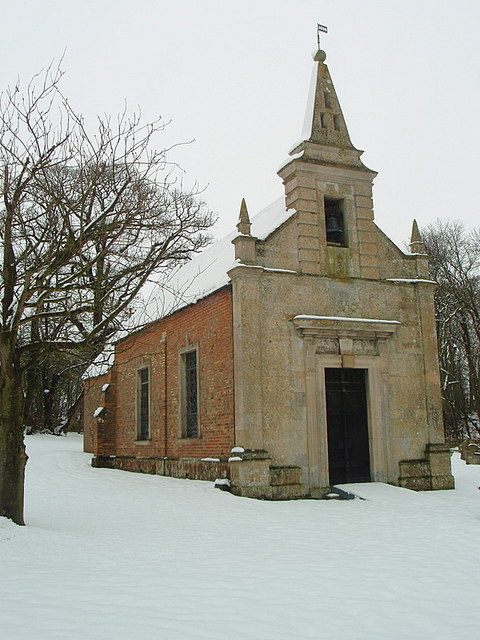
St John's Church at Little Gidding, visited by the Frasers and T. S. Eliot in 1936

On 23 May 1936 Hugh and Jessie Stewart took T. S. Eliot to Little Gidding, a visit that had been proposed a decade earlier by Jessie. Eliot's interest had been aroused by a play he had been given to read by George Every, dealing with the contact Charles I of England had had with the Little Gidding community in 1646.

== Works ==
Stewart wrote on French literature, and translated the works of Blaise Pascal, on whom he was considered an authority. His works included:

- Boethius: an essay (1891)
- Thirteen Homilies of St. Augustine on St. John XIV (1904)
- Invocation of Saints (1907)
- Memoir of J. E. B. Mayor (1911), in a collection he edited of sermons of John Eyton Bickersteth Mayor.
- The Holiness of Pascal (1915), Hulsean Lectures
- Francis Jenkinson, Fellow of Trinity College Cambridge and University Librarian (1926). Jenkinson's second wife was Stewart's sister Margaret.
- Translations from the Pensées:
  - The Secret of Pascal (1941)
  - Pascal's Apology for Religion (1942)
  - The Heart of Pascal (1945)

The Classical Movement in French Literature (1923), The Romantic Movement (1910) and The French Romanticists (1914) were anthologies that Stewart edited with Arthur Tilley. French Patriotism in the Nineteenth Century, traced in contemporary texts (1923) was edited with Paul Desjardins.

== Family ==
Stewart married in 1902 Jessie Graham Crum, daughter of William Graham Crum of Renfrewshire. They had five children: Ludovick Drumin; Jean Margaret; Katherine Fraser; Frideswide Frances Emma; and Margaret Campbell.
