= National Joint Committee for Spanish Relief =

British voluntary association

The National Joint Committee for Spanish Relief (NJCSR) was a British voluntary association formed at the end of 1936, intended to co-ordinate relief efforts to the victims of the Spanish Civil War. The NJCSR was to act as an umbrella organization, in a field where a number of groups already existed in the United Kingdom. It concentrated on three areas: (a) care of refugees; (b) bringing civilians out of war-affected areas; and (c) medical relief.

The NJCSR also acted as a pressure group. In the case of the evacuation of Basque children to the UK, it is regarded as effective in lobbying the government. Its historical role is contested, however; as part of a national "Aid Spain" movement, its wide political base has been seen as indicative of a popular front, involving numerous institutions, but historian Tom Buchanan has argued that support for Republican Spain was a form of single-issue politics that acted through individuals.

== Supporters ==
Prominent supporters of the Committee included Geoffrey Theodore Garratt, Eleanor Rathbone and Katharine Stewart-Murray, Duchess of Atholl. Its personnel overlapped largely with the Basque Children's Committee (BCC) of 1937, and the bodies shared London bases at 53 Marsham Street; but the BCC kept a certain distance, representing as it did organisations such as the Catholic Church which wanted nothing to do with the Communist Party of Great Britain (CPGB) associations of the NJCSR.

Publicity posters for the NJCSR were designed by Felicity Ashbee, a CPGB member. Leah Manning of the Spanish Medical Aid Committee represented the NJCSR on the ground in Bilbao, and Harry Pursey in Santander. Staff at the office in Perpignan in southern France included Nancy Mitford and Peter Rodd her husband, Frida Stewart, and Donald Darling.

== Formation ==
The war in Spain broke out in July 1936. An appeal from Julio Álvarez del Vayo on behalf of the Spanish government led a group of six British Members of Parliament to visit Madrid in November 1936: they were F. Seymour Cocks, W. P. Crawford-Greene, D. R. Grenfell, Archibald James, John Macnamara and Wilfrid Roberts. Roberts, on the Parliamentary Group for Spain of 15 MPs, then proposed a National Joint Committee, announced at Friends House on 23 December 1936. It first met in January 1937, continuing in Parliament's committee rooms. The leaders that emerged were Roberts, the Duchess of Atholl, and Isobel Brown; the Duchess was Chairman, with Grenfell, Macnamara and Roberts as secretaries.

The Scottish Joint Committee for Spanish Relief was formed in February 1938.

Before the formation of the NJCRS, there was a relief committee under the name "Friends of Spain" (National Committee of the Friends of Spain); and by some point in 1937 this was regarded as incorporated into the NJCRS. This group was not the American committee chaired by John A. Mackay, nor the "Friends of National Spain", a pro-Franco group around Alfred Denville that renamed itself in 1937.

== Events ==
- 24 June 1937 Spain and Culture, in aid of Basque Refugee Children, at the Royal Albert Hall. Many cultural figures as guests.
- October 1938, exhibition of Guernica by Pablo Picasso at the New Burlington Gallery.

== End of the Spanish war ==
With the close of the Spanish Civil War in March 1939, in victory for the forces of Francisco Franco, the NJCSR concentrated on humanitarian efforts in France. It gave some continuing support to the BCC. In 1941 NJSCR funds were used to secure admission to Argentina of Spanish Republicans. The BCC itself continued to function to 1951.
