= Carmen Posadas =

Uruguayan-Spanish author

Carmen de Posadas Mañé
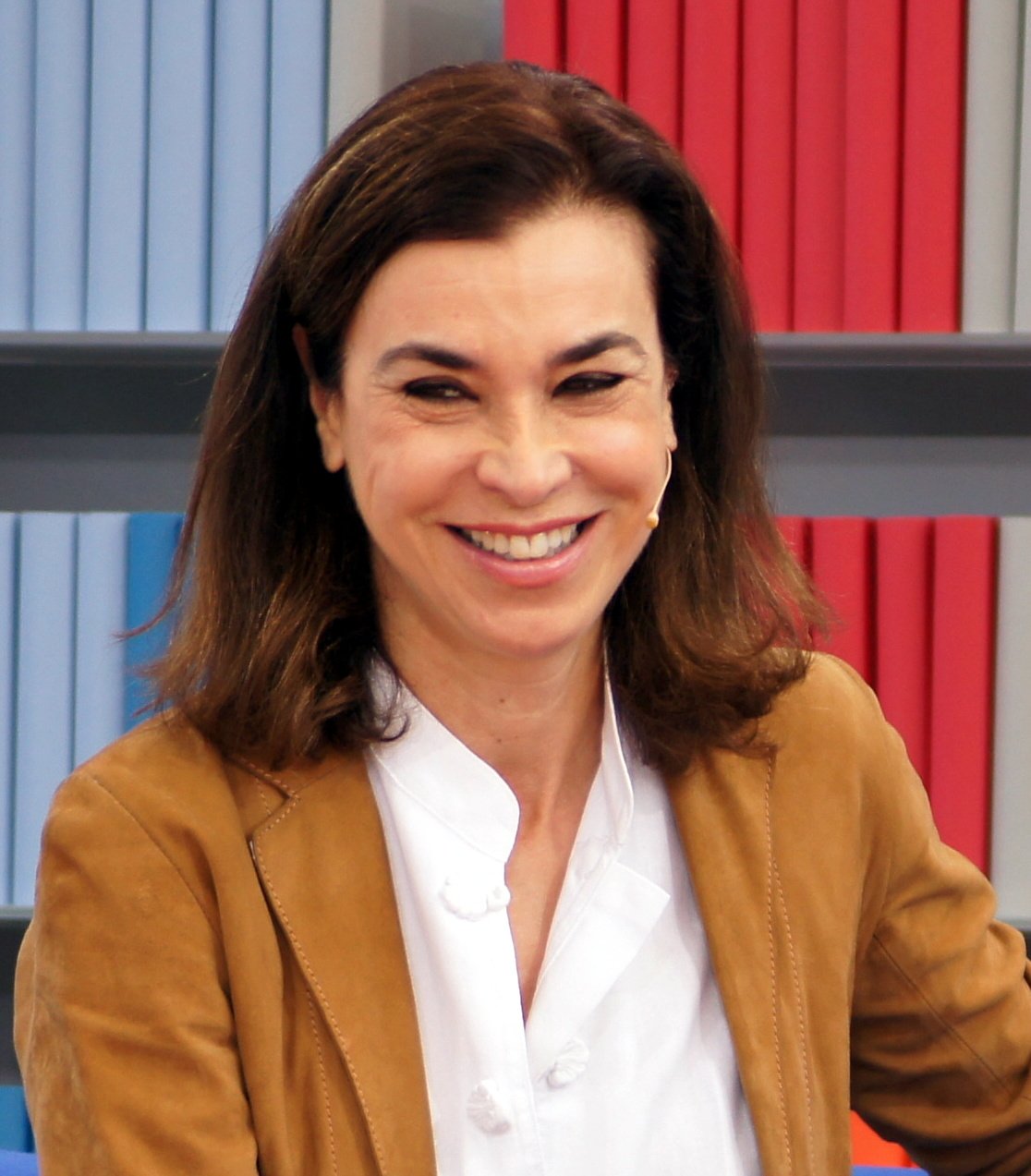
- Posadas in 2012
- Born: August 13, 1953 (age 73); Uruguay, Montevideo
- Occupation: Writer
- Writing career
- Pen name: Carmen Posadas
- Website: www.carmenposadas.net

Carmen Posadas (born August 13, 1953, in Montevideo) is a prize-winning Uruguayan-Spanish author of books for children. She also writes for film and television. She is a recipient of the Premio Planeta de Novela. She became an honorary professor of the University of Peru in 2010.

== Biography ==
She was born in Montevideo in 1953 as the daughter of an Uruguayan diplomat. She has lived in Madrid since 1965. Besides Madrid, she has also lived in many capital cities including Moscow, Buenos Aires, and London where her father was ambassador.

She went to Oxford University but left before graduating when she married Rafael de Cueto. They had two children, Sofía (1975) and Jimena (1978). She later divorced de Cueto and married Mariano Rubio. In 1985, she was granted Spanish nationality. In 1988, she became a host on Spanish public television RTVE.

She began her literary career in 1980 writing books for children. In 1984, she won the Premio Nacional de Literatura (Spanish prize of literature). In 1996 she published her first novel, Cinco Moscas Azules (Five Blue Flies) which was one of the most original and successful books of the year. Her second novel, Pequeñas infamias (Little Indiscretions), won the coveted Planeta Prize in 1998. Since then, she has sold more a million copies in more than fifty countries and she has been translated in 23 languages. More recent successful books are "Childs Play" and "The Red Ribbon".

Her brother, Gervasio Posadas, is also a prize-winning novelist.

== Bibliography ==
- Little Indiscretions. Random House 8/2003, translated by Christopher Andrews, ISBN 978-0-375-50885-1
- Child's Play. Alma Books 8/2008, ISBN 1-84688-051-3

Complete bibliography:

- Una cesta entre los juncos. 1980. Children's story.
- El cazador y el pastor. 1980. Children's story.
- El chico de la túnica de colores. 1980. Children's story.
- Hacia una tierra desconocida. 1980. Children's story.
- El Niño de Belén. 1980. Children's story.
- El pastor que llegó a ser Rey. 1980. Children's story.
- El señor viento Norte. 1983. Children's story. (Winner of the National Literature Prize 1984).
- El parque de papel. 1984. Textbook.
- Escena improbable. 1986. Inverviews. In collaboration with Lucrecia King-Hedinger.
- Kiwi. 1986. Children's story.
- Hipo canta. 1987. Children's story.
- Yuppies, jet set, la movida y otras especies. 1987. Essay.
- El síndrome de Rebeca: guía para conjurar fantasma. 1988. Essay.
- Mi hermano Salvador y otras mentiras. 1990. Short stories.
- El mercader de sueños y otros relatos. 1990. Short stories.
- Una ventana en el ático. 1993. Novel.
- Padres, padres. 1993. Essay.
- María Celeste. 1994. Children's story.
- Liliana, bruja urbana. 1995. Children's story.
- Cinco moscas azules. 1996. Novel.
- Nada es lo que parece. 1997. Essay.
- Pequeñas infamias. 1998. Novel. (Winner of Premio Planeta 1998).
- Encuentro con Cousteau en el polo Sur. 1999. Short story.
- Un veneno llamado amor. 1999. Essay.
- Tú y yo tan raros como siempre. 1999. Short story. In the collection: Hijas y padres.
- Dorilda. 2000. Children's story.
- La bella Otero. 2001. Novel.
- Por el ojo de la cerradura. 2001. Essay.
- El peinador de ideas. 2002. Short story.
- La hernia de Viriato. 2002. Essay. In collaboration with her daughter Sofía.
- El buen sirviente. 2003. Novel.
- Dorilda y Pancho. 2003. Children's story.
- A la sombra de Lilith. 2004. Essay. In collaboration with Sophie Courgeon.
- Elemental, querido Freud. 2005. Short story. Included in the anthology: Mujeres en ruta.
- Juego de niños. 2006. Novel.
- Literatura, adulterio y Visa platino. 2007.
- Hoy caviar, mañana sardinas. 2008. Novel. In collaboration with her brother Gervasio Posadas.
- La cinta roja 2008. Novel.
- Mi primer libro sobre Machado. 2009. Children's book.
- Invitación a un asesinato. 2010. Novel.
- El testigo invisible. 2013. Novel.
- La hija de Cayetana. 2016. Novel.
- La maestra de títeres. 2018. Novel.
- La leyenda de La Peregrina. 2020. Novel.
- Licencia para espiar. 2022. Novel.
- El misterioso caso del impostor del Titanic. 2024. Novel.

== Awards ==
- Ministry of Culture Award for best children's book published in 1984.
- Planeta Award in 1998.
- Apelles Mestres Award for Children's Literature, 2004.
- Sent Sovi Gastronomy Award of Literature 2007.
- Journalism Camilo José Cela Award in 2011.
- Culture Award Madrid, 2008.
- ABC Cultural & Ámbito Cultural Award 2011, from its directors Fernando Rodríguez Lafuente and Ramón Pernas.
- Cartagena Historical Novel Award in 2011.
- Glauka Award 2014.
- Brazier Award, Goncourt Gastronomic French Novel 2014.
- Carmen Posadas is a director of the European University of Madrid which has created the Carmen Posadas Chair.
