= Patience Darton =

British nurse and political activist (1911–1996)

- Born: 11 August 1911; Orpington, England
- Died: 6 November 1996 (aged 85); Madrid, Spain
- Other name: Patience Edney
- Education: University College Hospital
- Occupations: Nurse and political activist
- Spouse: Eric Edney
- Children: 1

Patience Darton (married name: Patience Edney; 11 August 1911 – 6 November 1996) was a British nurse and political activist active during the Spanish Civil War.

== Biography ==
Darton was born on 11 August 1911 in Orpington, England, into a middle-class family and hoped to study medicine, but her father's bankruptcy led her to work as a nanny and in a tea shop while saving up for the admissions fees into a nursing programme. From 1932-1935 Darton studied to be a nurse at University College Hospital, London, subsequently becoming a registered nurse Her experiences working in London's impoverished East End radicalized her and she joined the Labour Party. She also worked at the British Hospital for Mothers and Babies in London.

Darton volunteered her services as a nurse upon the outbreak of the Spanish Civil War. She arrived in Spain in February 1937 and worked in medical units at medical units in Aragón, Brunete, Teruel and Ebro. Despite working in difficult conditions (including a hospital inside a cave during the Ebro offensive), Darton re-diagnosed incorrectly diagnosed patients, saving them with correct treatment.

While in Spain, Darton met American writer Ernest Hemingway and English poet Stephen Spender and wrote in a letter of Hemingway: "He can't say what he wants to say and he talks just like his books, in bursts." She fell in love with a German member of the International Brigades named Robert Aaquist; Aaquist was killed in 1938.

She was evacuated from Spain with the rest of the International Brigades in October 1938.

Once back in London in 1938, Darton joined the British Communist Party. She would remain a committed member for the rest of her life.

Darton taught specialized courses in war nursing and wound treatment during World War II for the London County Council. After World War II, she worked in famine relief for the newly-established United Nations Relief and Rehabilitation Agency (UNRRA).

Darton married British Communist Party official (and Brigade member) Eric Edney; the newlyweds traveled to China in 1949 to assist with the transition to socialism, but faced complications in their political task and were jailed for some time. She also worked for the Foreign Languages Press. Darton gave birth to her son Robert while in China. The family returned to England in 1958.

In November 1996, Darton travelled with other former International Brigade members to Madrid to celebrate the 60th anniversary of the Spanish Civil War, where they received honorary Spanish citizenship. Darton died on 6 November 1996 while in Madrid.
