= Paul Preston =

British historian (born 1946)

Sir Paul Preston CBE
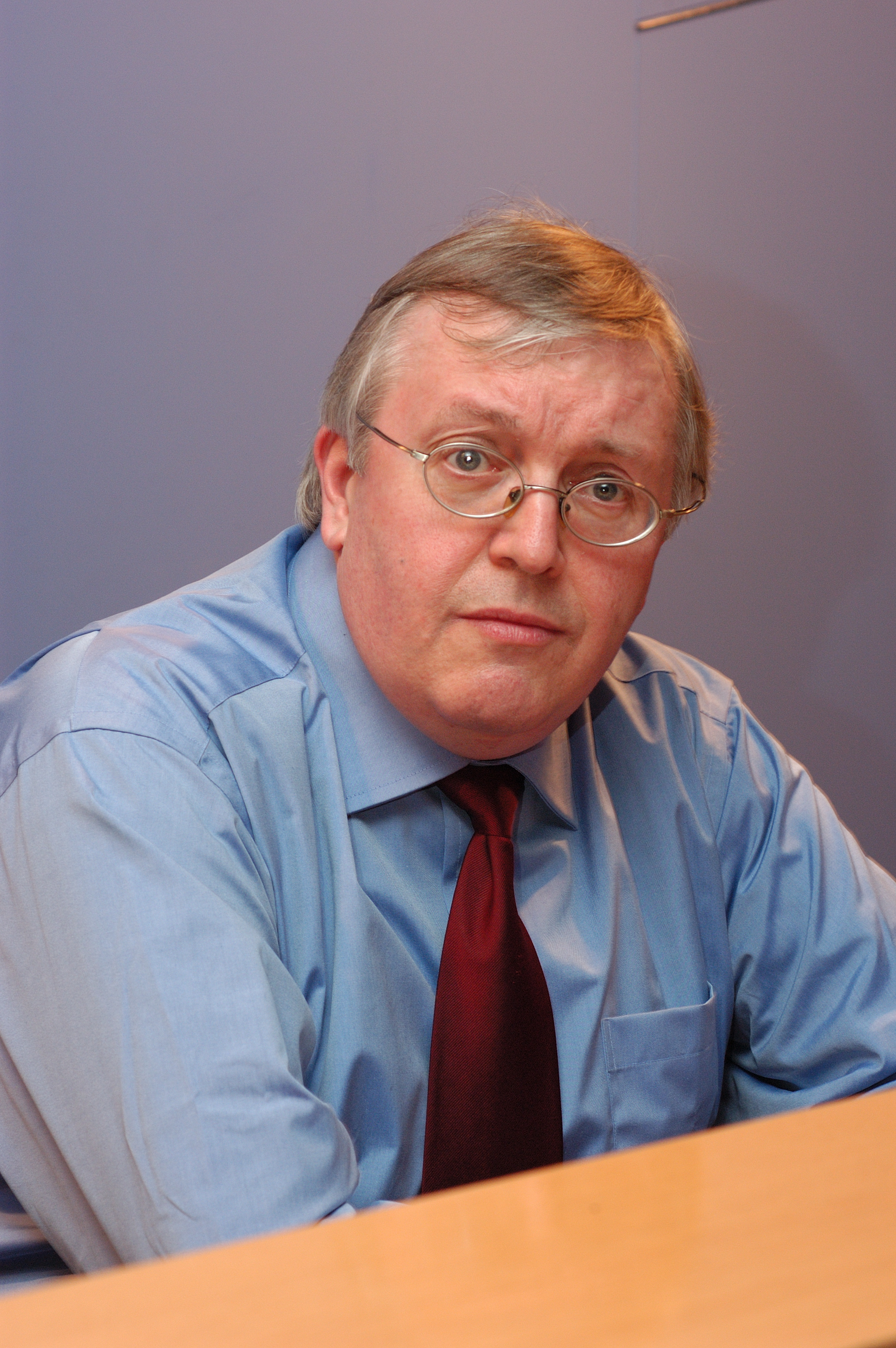
- Preston in 2004
- Born: 21 June 1946 (age 80); Liverpool, England
- Spouse: Gabriella

Academic background
- Education: Oriel College, Oxford (BA, DPhil); University of Reading (MA)
- Thesis: The Socialists, the legalistic right and the break-down of parliamentary government in Spain, 1931–1936 (1977)
- Doctoral advisor: Christopher Seton-Watson
- Other advisors: Hugh Thomas; Raymond Carr

Academic work
- Discipline: History
- Institutions: University of Reading (1973–1975); Queen Mary University of London (1975–); London School of Economics (1991–2020)

Sir Paul Preston CBE (born 21 July 1946) is an English historian and Hispanist, biographer of Francisco Franco, and specialist in Spanish history, in particular the Spanish Civil War, which he has studied for more than 50 years. He is the winner of multiple awards for his books on the Spanish Civil War.

== Biography ==
Preston was born in 1946 in Liverpool and brought up in a working-class neighbourhood by his grandparents (due to his mother's tuberculosis). He was a Catholic early in his life. Preston said in an interview that he has sympathy for the Second Spanish Republic: "I came from a fairly left-wing family. You could not really be from working-class Liverpool and not be left-wing. Emotionally, in my feeling for the Republic I think there is an element of indignation about the Republic's defeat, solidarity with the losing side. Maybe that's why I support Everton, although Everton wasn't the losing side in my day."

Preston studied for his undergraduate degree in history at Oriel College, Oxford from 1964, while teaching part-time at a primary and secondary school in Huyton. He then gained an MA in European Studies at the University of Reading, where he took a course on the Spanish Civil War with Hugh Thomas. He travelled to Francoist Spain in 1969 (visiting Arroyo de la Miel) and 1973, and later credited his experience of the dictatorship with shaping his political views. He moved back to Oriel College to gain his DPhil with a thesis on The Socialists, the legalistic right and the break-down of parliamentary government in Spain, 1931–1936 (initially supervised by Raymond Carr, then by Christopher Seton-Watson) in 1977. He lectured at the University of Reading as Hugh Thomas's replacement between 1973 and 1975, and was Thomas's research assistant for the 1977 third revised edition of The Spanish Civil War.

Preston joined Queen Mary University of London as a lecturer in 1975. From 1991 to 2020 he taught at the London School of Economics, where he was Príncipe de Asturias Professor of Contemporary Spanish Studies and the founding director of the Cañada Blanch Centre for Contemporary Spanish Studies from 1994 to 2020.

He is a frequent visitor to Spain, where his work appears in Spanish and Catalan. He speaks both languages.

He has been a member of the Royal Historical Society since 1982, of the British Academy since 1994, and of the University of California, Berkeley's Institute of International Studies since 1996. He acted as the founding chair of the International Brigade Memorial Trust in 2000.

He has a wife, Gabriella, to whom he dedicated The Spanish Holocaust: Inquisition and Extermination in Twentieth-Century Spain.

== Publications ==
Regarding criticism from right-wing media outlets over his depictions of Franco and other figures, Preston stated in a 2021 interview: "I try to be honest, even if the right-wing press paints me as an amateur and a liar."

Preston has produced a biography of Franco (Basic Books, 1994). He has also published a biography of King Juan Carlos I (2003). Recent books include We Saw Spain Die, on the subject of foreign correspondents who reported on the Spanish Civil War and Perfidious Albion: Britain and the Spanish Civil War, a collection of essays exploring "the hypocrisy of British foreign policy towards the Spanish Republic, in contrast to the selfless contribution of medical personnel from across the globe, including many doctors and nurses from Britain, Ireland and Commonwealth countries, and assessing the influence of prominent ‘writer-historians’ including George Orwell and Herbert Southworth."

He has been described by Stephen Kotkin as "having a fair claim to being the world's leading authority on 20th-century Spain".

=== The Spanish Holocaust ===
In 2012 he published the English edition of the Spanish Holocaust. This book represents a challenge to the pact of forgetting, examining the many deaths and atrocities associated with the Spanish Civil War, and following the Francoist repression into the early 1950s.

The book was criticised by the historian Stanley G. Payne; while Payne did praise Preston for his depth and breadth of research into atrocities during and after the war, he criticised Preston for bias in his downplaying of Republican atrocities. Payne argues that Franco's policy was to simply eliminate the leaders and main activists of the Republicans while letting most of the rank and file go free. On the other hand, Payne said that Preston's estimate for post-war executions committed by the Francoist regime was probably too low.

At the same time the book received praise among other academics and journalists, with Giles Tremlett writing in the Guardian: "Preston provides facts, figures and harrowing descriptions in the first full and proper attempt to explain the horror. He does not shy away from strong words – 'holocaust' is deliberately chosen to describe the extent of cold-blooded killing [...] because its resonances with systematic murder should be evoked in the Spanish case, as they are in those of Germany or Russia".“

=== Architects of Terror ===
In 2023, he published Architects of Terror: Paranoia, Conspiracy and Anti-Semitism in Franco's Spain, in which he examined the conspiracy theories and antisemitism behind the rise of Francoism. The book included profiles of six figures within the Francoist camp: Emilio Mola, Gonzalo Queipo de Llano, Mauricio Carlavilla, Juan Tusquets Terrats, José María Pemán, and Gonzalo de Aguilera Munro.

Robert Low of The Jewish Chronicle reviewed the book positively, saying that it "shows how fake news is certainly not an invention of the 21st century, and that its consequences can be far-reaching and frequently lethal."

== Views and approach ==
Preston has described himself as "not a theorist" and his work as "not Marxist", expressing a preference for biography over social history in his later years. He declared himself a "big admirer" of Gerald Brenan's account of the background to the Spanish Civil War in the 1943 The Spanish Labyrinth, and stated that he had been influenced by Burnett Bolloten's 1961 book The Grand Camouflage. He confessed to having "enormous admiration for Juan Carlos" for his role in the Spanish transition to democracy.

== Awards and honours ==
- 1986: Commander of the Order of Civil Merit
- 2000: Commander of the Order of the British Empire (Civil Division)
- 2005: Ramon Llull International Prize
- 2006: Grand Cross of the Order of Isabella the Catholic
- 2012: Samuel Johnson Prize, shortlist, The Spanish Holocaust
- 2013: Honour Prize of the Lluís Carulla's Foundation
- 2018: Knighthood for services to UK/Spain relations.

=== Honorary Doctorates ===
- 2015: Doctor Honoris causa from the Universitat Rovira i Virigili
- 2015: Doctor Honoris causa from the University of Liverpool
- 2015: Doctor Honoris causa from the Universidad de Extremadura
- 2015: Doctor Honoris causa from the Universitat de València
- 2016: Doctor Honoris causa from the Universitat de Barcelona
- 2019: Doctor Honoris causa from the Universidad de Cantabria
- 2023: Doctor Honoris causa from the Universidad de Granada

== Bibliography ==
- — (1978). The Coming of the Spanish Civil War: Reform, Reaction and Revolution in the Second Republic 1931–1936. London: Macmillan.
- __ (1986) The Spanish Civil War 1936–39, Weidenfeld & Nicolson.
  - (1996) [revised and updated version] A Concise History of the Spanish Civil War, London: Fontana Press.
- — (1993). Franco: A Biography. HarperCollins. ISBN 9780465025152.
- — (1999). ¡Comrades! Portraits from the Spanish Civil War. London: HarperCollins.
- — (2002). Doves of War: Four Women of Spain. London: HarperCollins.
- — (2004). Juan Carlos: A People's King. London: HarperCollins. (Note: Published in the US with the subtitle: Steering Spain from Dictatorship to Democracy.)
- — (2006). The Spanish Civil War: Reaction, Revolution and Revenge. London: HarperCollins. ISBN 0393329879.
- — (2008). El gran manipulador. La mentira cotidiana de Franco. Barcelona: Ediciones B.
- — (2009). We Saw Spain Die: Foreign Correspondents in the Spanish Civil War. London: Constable and Robinson. ISBN 978-1602397675.
- — (2012). The Spanish Holocaust: Inquisition and Extermination in Twentieth-Century Spain. London: Harper Press. ISBN 978-0393345919.
- — (2013). El zorro rojo, la vida de Santiago Carrillo. Madrid: Debate.
- — (2016). The Last Days of The Spanish Republic. London: William Collins.
- — (2020). A People Betrayed: A History of Corruption, Political Incompetence and Social Division in Modern Spain 1874-2018. London: William Collins.
- — (2023). Architects of Terror: Paranoia, Conspiracy and Anti-Semitism in Franco's Spain. London: William Collins.
- — (2024). Perfidious Albion: Britain and the Spanish Civil War. London: The Clapton Press.
- — (2026). Downfall of a King: Juan Carlos of Spain. London: William Collins.

=== As editor ===
- Paul Preston, ed. (1976). Spain in Crisis: Evolution and Decline of the Franco Regime. London: Branch Line.
- Paul Preston, ed. (1976). Leviátan: Antologia. Ediciones Turner.
- Paul Preston, ed. (2001). Revolution and War in Spain, 1931–1939. Routledge.
