= 3rd Mixed Brigade =

Third Mixed Brigade Tercera Brigada Mixta
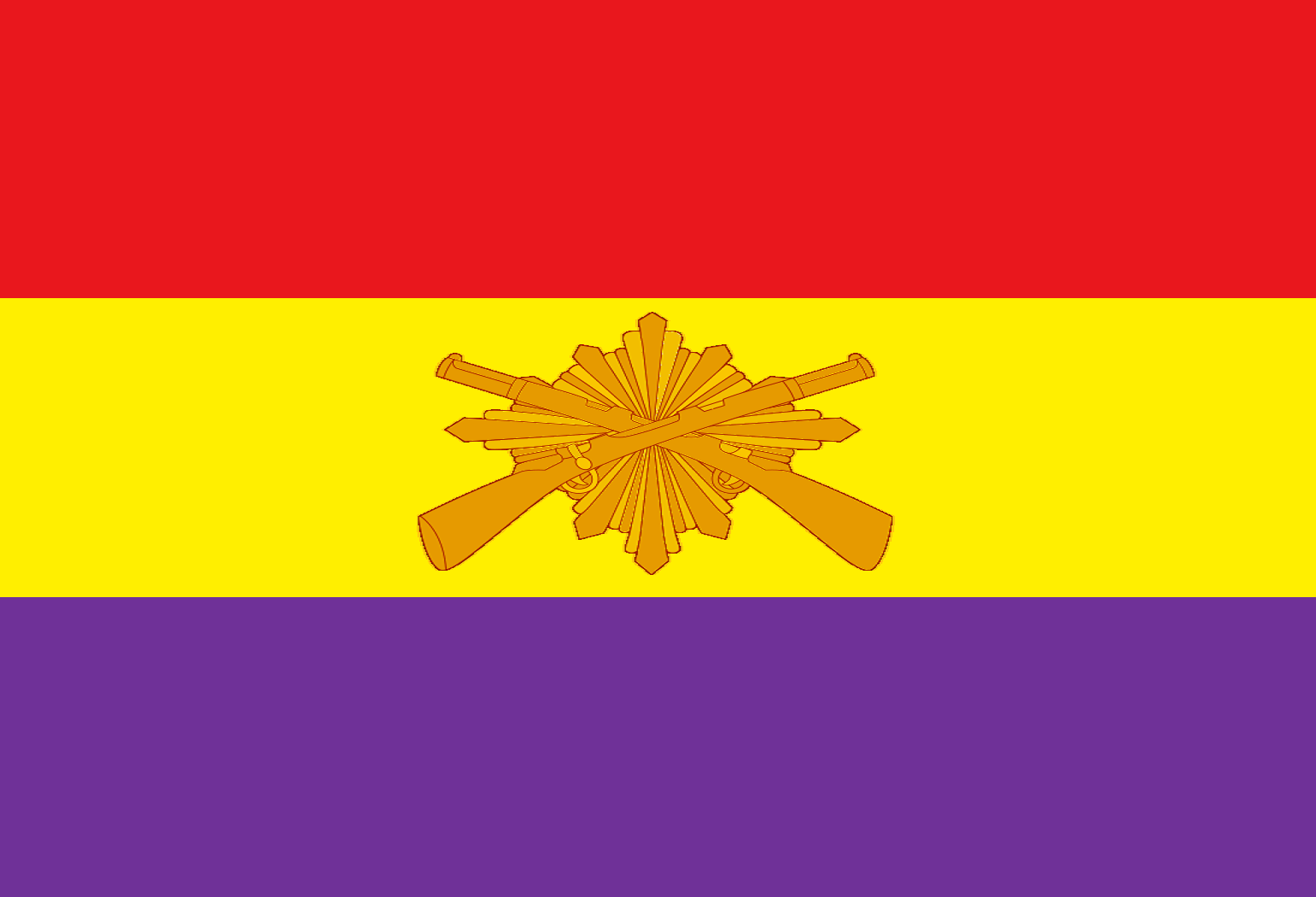
- Standard of the Carabineros Corps
- Active: 1936–1939
- Country: Spain
- Branch: Spanish Republican Army
- Type: Mixed Brigade
- Role: Home Defence
- Size: Four battalions: The 9th, 10th, 11th and 12th
- Part of: 10th Division (1936 - 1937); 34th Division (1937 - 1938); 56th Division (1938 - 1939)
- Garrison/HQ: Alcázar de San Juan
- Engagements: Spanish Civil War

Commanders
- Notable commanders: José María Galán

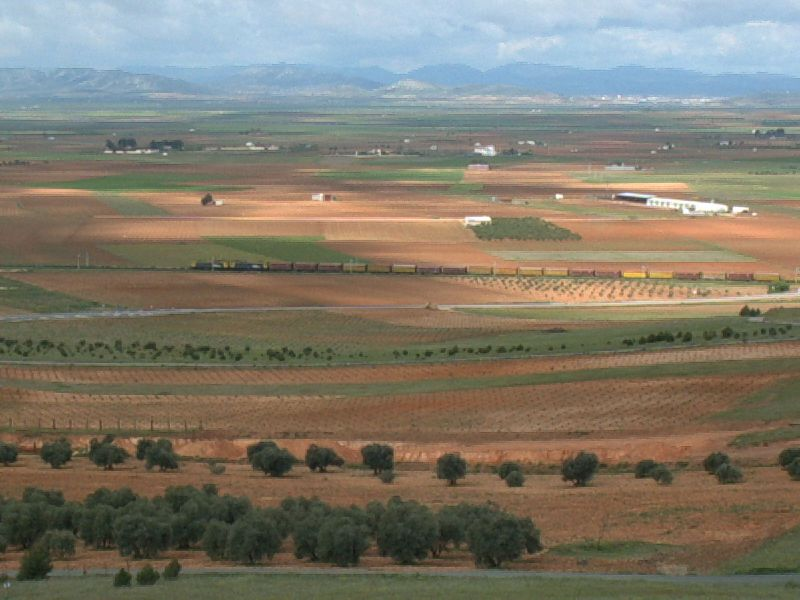
View of Alcázar de San Juan where the Third Mixed Brigade was established.

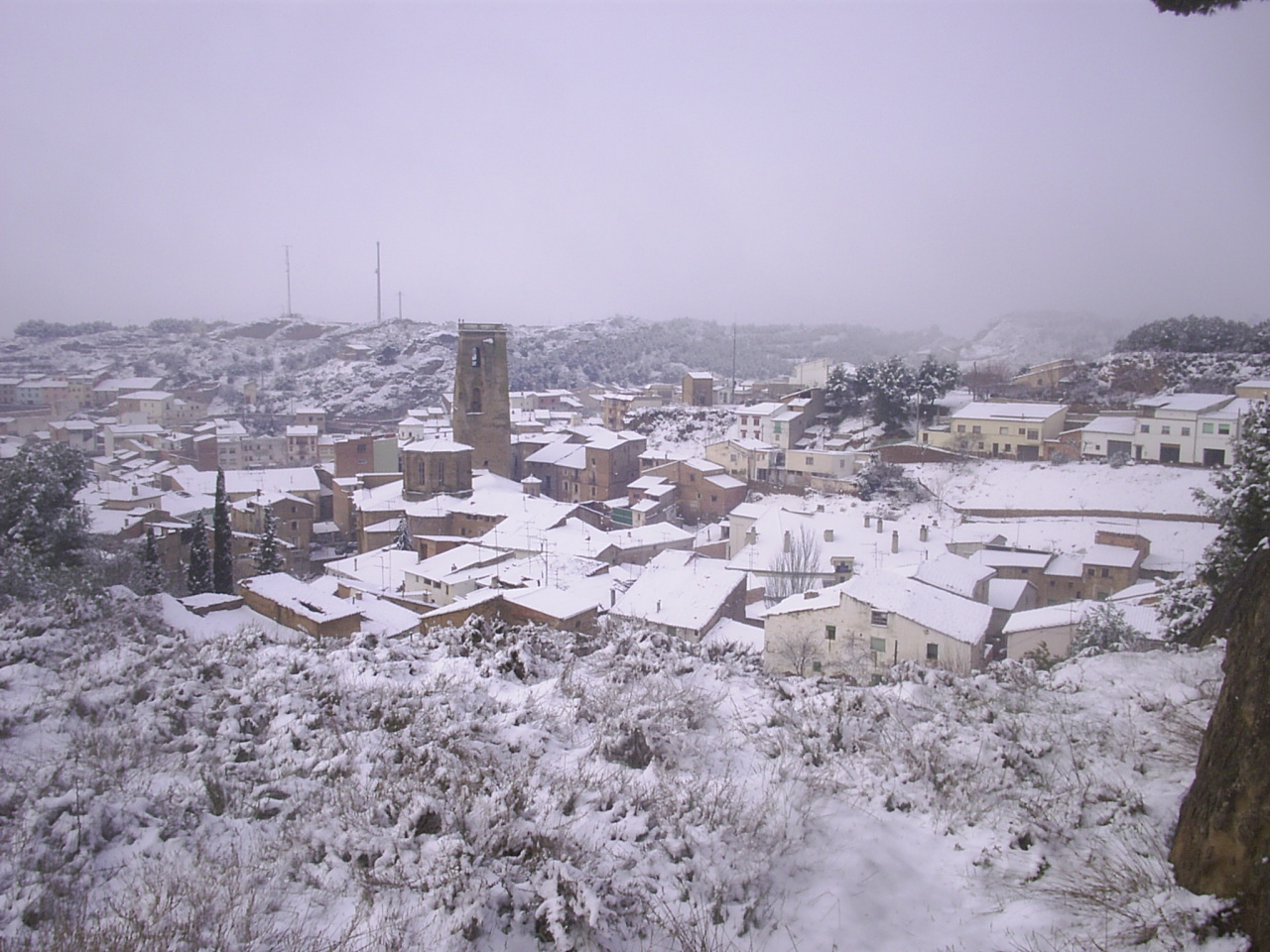
In the Tamarite de Litera sector, where the 3rd Mixed Brigade was sent in March 1938, many of its members lost their lives.

Map of Spain after the Francoist victory in Aragon. The 3rd Mixed Brigade became one of the units locked in Catalonia and isolated from the remaining Republican territory.

The 3rd Mixed Brigade (Spanish: 3.ª Brigada Mixta), was one of the earliest mixed brigades of the Spanish Republican Army in the Spanish Civil War. It was formed in the fall of 1936 with battalions of the Carabineros corps and saw major action right away in the Defence of Madrid. This brigade also included female combatants —such as Sergeant "La Chata"— and would take part in most of the major battles of the Spanish Civil War, except in the Battle of Jarama.

The brigade's first leader was Carabineros Lieutenant —later Commander— José María Galán, brother of Fermín Galán, leader of the Jaca Uprising, and of Francisco Galán. The mouthpiece of this military unit was the "Tercera Brigada" newspaper.

The Third Mixed Brigade is mentioned in the lyrics of Si me quieres escribir, one of the most famous songs of the Spanish Republican troops during the Civil War.

Si me quieres escribir, Ya sabes mi paradero: Tercera Brigada Mixta, Primera línea de fuego.	If you want to write to me, You know where I am posted: The 3rd Mixed Brigade, In the first line of fire.

== History ==
=== Establishment and Madrid Defence ===
The 3rd Mixed Brigade was established in October 1936 in Alcázar de San Juan, Ciudad Real Province, though most of its members hailed from Albacete Province. Following a brief period of training the new brigade was sent to the Las Rozas-Majadahonda sector of the Defence of Madrid on 7 November. It began front line combat while still not fully formed, with a total of about 2,500 men. The same day of its baptism of fire the brigade was able to repel a rebel faction attack at Retamares. After a week more troops were added to the brigade, until reaching a total of 3,225. While at the Cantonment zone the brigade staged a counterattack that was a failure.

On 26 November 1936 the Third Mixed Brigade was sent to the Ciudad Universitaria frontline. and on 29 November it was able to repel an attack in the Pozuelo sector, where it suffered numerous casualties, including its commander José María Galán, who was wounded in the combats and had to be replaced by Carabineros Captain Emeterio Jarillo Orgaz, who had been Lieutenant at the 6th Comandancia in Alicante Province at the time of the 1936 coup of the pro-Fascist generals. The much-battered brigade was then removed from the front line of the battlefield in order to be rebuilt, following which it was sent to the Andalusian front. On 26 December it arrived to Andújar, where it took positions in the Madrid - Cádiz highway. However, the situation at the Madrid Front was so critical that the brigade was recalled to Madrid on 3 January 1937.

The brigade arrived to the Madrid rearguard on 7 January and was kept back in reserve until 11 January when it was sent to the Vértice Cumbre on the road to Villanuesa del Pardillo. From there it launched an unsuccessful attack in Las Rozas. On 23 March Cavalry Captain Joaquín de Zulueta Isasi assumed command of the Third Mixed Brigade and the unit was made part of the 10th Division which was led by the brigade's former commander José María Galán. The 10th Division belonged to the V Army Corps of the Central Army (Ejército del Centro)

Since it was committed to the Madrid Front, the 3rd Mixed Brigade did not take part in the Battle of Jarama, but it fought at the Battle of Guadalajara in the Pico del Cuervo sector in May 1937 and in June 1937 it was dispatched to La Granja, the scenario of one of the battles of the Segovia Offensive. Prior to being sent the brigade was concentrated at Fuencarral and Militia Major Antonio Pérez Quijano became the new commander, replacing Captain Zulueta. The brigade took part in this battle in support of the 69th Mixed Brigade in its effort to capture the Alto del León on 30 Mayo and the Cabeza Grande Hill on 2 June. Finally, on 4 June the 3rd Mixed Brigade was withdrawn to Fuencarral.

=== Later battles and demise of the brigade ===
Almost without time to rest, the 3rd Mixed Brigade was ordered to get ready for the Battle of Brunete. Initially it left to become part of the reserve, but it soon saw itself involved in severe vanguard combats. On 10 July it occupied the Vértice Mocha position, only to lose it soon thereafter. The following day the unit attacked Villafranca del Castillo, but with lack of thrust, so the brigade held to its positions until 20 July when the attack went badly and one of its battalions unjustifiably lost crucial positions in hills 660 and 640 to the enemy. Owing to this failure Major Pérez Quijano was removed from his post and replaced by Carabineros Commander Agustín Colomina Solera. On 24 July the 3rd Mixed Brigade retreated to the right bank of the Aulencia River.

On 4 August 1937 the brigade was moved again to the Andalusian Front, becoming part of the 34th Division of the XVIII Army Corps of the Southern Army (Ejército del Sur) and Commander Colomina was replaced by Carabineros Commander Antonio Martínez Rabadán.

When the Aragon Offensive was underway and going badly for the loyalist armies, the 3rd Mixed Brigade was urgently dispatched to Aragon around mid March 1938 as a reserve for the Ebro Army (Ejército del Ebro). However, in the face of the magnitude of the Francoist operation and the general crumbling of the front, the 3rd Mixed Brigade was then urgently sent eastward to a front line position, being made part of the X Army Corps of the Eastern Army (Ejército del Este). Its mission was to defend the sector between Tamarite de Litera and Viñaza Hill (Vértice Viñaza), but it was not able to bear the Francoist onslaught and the brigade suffered a great loss of lives during the last-ditch withdrawal.

By 6 April the rebel victory in Aragon had cut the territory of the Spanish Republic in two and the survivors of the much depleted 3rd Mixed Brigade were evacuated for a rest to the Coastal Defence in Catalonia. Then the unit went back inland to Bellvís where they camped for a time in order for the brigade to be rebuilt. The Republican high command assigned the reassembled mixed brigade to the 56th Division of the XII Army Corps, under the Group of Eastern Region Armies. Infantry Commander Hernando Liñán Castaños, a former Alférez that had lived in retirement, replaced Carabineros Commander Martínez Rabadán as leader of the unit.

In the Battle of the Ebro the 3rd Mixed Brigade was cut to pieces while attempting to cross the Ebro River near Amposta on 25 July. Thus the again much damaged brigade had to be removed from the front line and deployed in peripheral operations undertaken to relieve the Ebro Front. These included trying to establish a bridgehead in Vilanova de la Barca in August.

At the onset of the overpowering Catalonia Offensive, the brigade was in the Seròs bridgehead sector. Unable to resist against the crushing rebel pressure it began a withdrawal from Torres de Segre to Torrebesses. Then the 3rd Mixed Brigade steadily retreated towards the international border in the north amidst the general debacle of the Republican military units in Catalonia.

After crossing into France the 3rd Mixed Brigade's members were disarmed and interned in concentration camps by the French authorities and the unit became extinguished. The brigade's last leader had been Carabineros Commander José Vila Cuenca and its last report had been written in January 1939.

=== Post-Civil War ===
The Second World War began just a few months after the end of the Spanish conflict, where the Francoist forces aligned with the Axis powers had been victorious. However, from the concentration camps in France, such as Argelès-sur-Mer and Le Barcarès some former members of the 3rd Mixed Brigade managed to reach the French Resistance in order to continue the combat against Nazi Germany. Among the former Third Mixed Brigade members that could not escape the French camps, some ended up in the Mauthausen-Gusen concentration camp.

== Commanders ==
All commanders of the Third Mixed Brigade had been officers of the Carabineros corps, except for Joaquín de Zulueta, Antonio Pérez and Hernando Liñán.

- Commanders in Chief
  - José María Galán
  - Emeterio Jarillo Orgaz
  - Joaquín de Zulueta Isasi
  - Antonio Pérez Quijano
  - Agustín Colomina Solera
  - Antonio Martínez Rabadán
  - Hernando Liñán Castaños
  - José Vila Cuenca

== See also ==
- Carabineros
- Si me quieres escribir
- Songs of the Spanish Civil War
