= Galán (surname) =

Galán is a surname. Notable people with the surname include:

== Clergy ==
- Carlos Walter Galán Barry, auxiliary bishop of Morón and archbishop of La Plata
- Lucas Ramírez Galán O.F.M. (1714–1774), Spanish Roman Catholic archbishop

== Performers ==
- Alberto Galán (1901–1977), Spanish-born Mexican film actor
- Cachita Galán (1943–2004), Argentine singer
- Gilda Galán, Puerto Rican actress
- Joaquín and Lucía Galán, Argentine duo better known as Pimpinela

== Politicians ==
- José María Garza Galán, Mexican politician
- Juan Manuel Galán Pachón, Colombian politician
- Luis Carlos Galán, Colombian politician murdered in 1989
- Tommy Galán, Dominican politician

== Sportspeople ==
- Álvaro Galán Floria, boccia player from Spain
- Borja Galán (born 1993), Spanish footballer
- Daniel Elahi Galán (born 1996), Colombian tennis player
- Enrique Galán, Spanish footballer
- Ernesto Galán, Spanish footballer
- Javier "Javi" Galán Gil (born 1994), Spanish footballer
- Jorge Galán, Spanish footballer
- José Galán, Spanish footballer
- Pedro José Lorenzo Galán, Spanish footballer
- Romeo Galán, Argentine sprinter
- Sebastián Galán, Uruguayan footballer

== Military people ==
- Carlos F. Galán, Spanish-born lieutenant for the Mexican Army, lawyer, founder of La Baja California
- Fermín Galán, Spanish soldier
- Francisco Galán, Spanish military officer
- Jorge E. Galán, Argentine biologist
- José María Galán, Spanish military officer
- Juana Galán, Spanish guerrilla fighter

== Writers ==
- Ana Galán, Spanish writer
- José María Gabriel y Galán, Spanish poet
- Juan Eslava Galán, Spanish writer

== Others ==
- Alfredo Galán, Spanish serial killer
- Cristóbal Galán, Spanish composer
- Demetrio Galán Bergua, Spanish physician, humanist and journalist
- José Antonio Galán, Colombian historical figure
- José Ignacio Sánchez Galán, Spanish businessman
- Julio Galán, Mexican artist
- Nely Galán, Cuban entrepreneur
- Pacho Galán, Colombian composer
- Pedro Cerezo Galán, Spanish philosopher and university professor.
