= Ángel García Hernández =

Spanish soldier

Miguel Ángel García Hernández
- García Hernández from the cover of Crónica in December 1931
- Born: 29 January 1899; Vitoria, Álava, Spain
- Died: 14 December 1930 (aged 31); Huesca, Spain
- Cause of death: Execution by firing squad
- Occupation: Soldier
- Known for: Role in Jaca uprising

Miguel Ángel García Hernández (29 January 1899 – 14 December 1930) was a Spanish soldier who was one of the leaders of the failed Jaca uprising which tried to overthrow the monarchy. He was executed by firing squad after a summary trial. The incident caused general public outrage. He became a hero of the Second Spanish Republic when it was established a few months later.

== Early years ==
Ángel García Hernández was born in Vitoria, Álava on 29 January 1899 to a military family. He joined the army and served in the colonial war in Morocco. He became sensitized to the problems of the army that arose during the dictatorship of General Miguel Primo de Rivera. He was promoted to artillery captain and assigned to the Jaca garrison. When Captain Fermín Galán was assigned to Jaca the two men developed a strong understanding. García Hernández was one of the leaders of the group of officers that planned the Jaca uprising.

== Uprising ==
Captain Galán launched the uprising in Jaca in the early hours of 12 December. A group of officers called out the troops at 5:00 a.m., arrested the military governor, killed two carabineros and a Civil Guard sergeant who opposed them, and took control of the telephone exchange, post office and railway station. At 11:00 a.m. they proclaimed the Republic "on behalf of the Revolutionary Provisional Government" at Jaca city hall. Two columns were organized to travel to Huesca. One led by Galán would go by road, while the other led by Salvador Sediles would take the railway. The column of 300 soldiers led by Sediles found the railway tracks raised at Riglos, and walked from there to join Galán's column at Ayerbe. The combined force then moved towards Huesca, where conspirators in the artillery were expected to join the rebellion as planned.

At dawn on 13 December 1930 at the heights of Cillas, about 3 kilometres (1.9 mi) from Huesca, the rebels found themselves confronted by the government force. Galán had a choice of fighting or negotiating. Since he thought many of the opposing troops were under officers committed to the uprising, he chose the latter. The civilian Antonio Beltrán drove Captain García Hernández and Captain Salinas across the line in a car with a white flag. When they arrived and said they wanted to parley with the officers they were immediately arrested. The government troops then began to fire on the insurgents.

Galán refused to order a counterattack because "brothers cannot fight each other", and ordered withdrawal. The rebel force disintegrated. Some soldiers and their officers returned to Jaca, some were arrested and some tried to escape. Galán voluntarily surrendered in Biscarrués with other rebels and arrived in Ayerbe about 10:00 p.m. on 13 December.

== Death and legacy ==
On 14 December in a short court martial captains Galán and García Hernández were condemned to death, while other officers were sentenced to life imprisonment. The captains were tried by a summary Council of War in the Pedro I Barracks in Huesca presided over by General Arturo Lezcano, and were sentenced to death by firing squad. The Captain General of Aragon signed the sentence, and the Council of Ministers in Madrid sent their acknowledgement. Galán and García Hernández were shot in a courtyard in Huesca at 3:00 p.m. on 14 December 1930. They chose to die while facing the firing squad without blindfolds.

In Madrid the Prime Minister General Damaso Berenguer declared, "The Palace was fully convinced that the exemplary executions of Galán and García Hernández will prevent the spread of revolutionary ideas in the Army." This proved to be fatally mistaken. The execution provoked outrage against the regime. The poet Rafael Alberti wrote later,

During the first months of the year 1931, the echoes of the executioners' bullets that had cut down Captain Galán and Captain García Hernández were still heard throughout Spain, and such terrorism momentarily obscured the path along which people had begun to move. With almost the entire future government of the Republic in the Model Prison, no one could imagine that a tidal wave was forming beneath the surface and that the water would burst forth, like a fountain and fireworks display, on that fateful April 4th.

Within four months the massive popular demonstrations arising from the execution led to the fall of the monarchy. Galán and García Hernández became heroes of the Second Republic, with their portraits displayed in council chambers and the homes of workers throughout Spain. There is a street named García Hernández in Jaca. In October 2017 the graves of Fermín Galán Rodríguez and Ángel García Hernández in the Cemetery of Huesca were declared historical sites of cultural interest, to be specially protected by the municipality.

== Sources ==
- Alberti, Rafael (1981), Alberti, University of California Press, ISBN 978-0-520-04265-0
- Azpiroz Pascual, José María (December 2000), "La sublevación de Jaca", Trébede, Cremallo de ediciones S.L.
- Casanova, Julián (2010-07-29), The Spanish Republic and Civil War, Cambridge University Press, ISBN 978-1-139-49057-3
- "García Hernández, Ángel", GEA: Gran Enciclopedia Aragonesa (in Spanish), DiCom Medios SL.
- Gil Pecharromán, Julio, "Fusilamientos en Jaca, haciendo mártires", El Mundo (in Spanish)
- Gongora, Francisco (21 July 2015), "Un golpe de estado muy vitoriano", El Correo (in Spanish)
- "Jaca republicana", Jaca.com (in Spanish), editorial Pirineum
- "Jaca, sublevación de, (1930)", GEA: Gran Enciclopedia Aragonesa (in Spanish), DiCom Medios SL.
- Kelsey, Graham (1991-11-30), Anarchosyndicalism, Libertarian Communism and the State: The CNT in Zaragoza and Aragon, 1930-1937, Springer Science & Business Media, ISBN 978-0-7923-0275-9
- "Las sepulturas de los capitanes Fermín Galán y Ángel García Hernández, bienes de interés cultural", La Vanguardia (in Spanish), 3 October 2017
- Paz, Abel (2007), Durruti in the Spanish Revolution, AK Press, ISBN 978-1-904859-50-5
