= Salvador Sediles =

Spanish soldier

Salvador Sediles Moreno
- Sediles from a package of Cigarrillos la Favorita c. 1935
- Born: 23 June 1897; Cáceres, Spain
- Died: 28 September 1936 (aged 39); Toledo, Spain
- Occupations: Soldier, politician

Salvador Sediles Moreno (23 June 1897 – 28 September 1936) was a Spanish soldier and politician. He is best known as one of the leaders of the Jaca uprising of 12 December 1930, a failed attempt to abolish the monarchy that was soon followed by the declaration of the Second Spanish Republic. He entered politics on the extreme left in 1931. He died as a militia leader in Toledo soon after the start of the Spanish Civil War.

== Life ==
Salvador Sediles Moreno was born in Cáceres, Spain, in 1897.

Sediles participated with other officers including captains Fermín Galán, Ángel García Hernández, Luís Salinas and Miguel Gallo in the Jaca uprising of 12 December 1930. After the Republic had been proclaimed in Jaca, two columns were organized to travel to Huesca. One led by Galán would go by road, while the other led by Sediles would take the railway. The insurgents looked forward to a triumphant journey of liberation. The column of 300 soldiers led by Sediles found the railway tracks raised at Riglos, and walked from there to join Galán's column at Ayerbe. The combined force then moved towards Huesca, where conspirators in the artillery were expected to join the rebellion as planned.

At dawn on 13 December 1930 at the heights of Cillas, about 3 kilometres (1.9 mi) from Huesca, the rebels found themselves confronted by the government force. After an attempt by the insurgents to negotiate, the government troops then began to fire on them. Galán refused to order a counterattack because "brothers cannot fight each other", and ordered withdrawal. Some soldiers and their officers returned to Jaca, some were arrested and some tried to escape.

In March 1931 a number of the insurgent officers and NCOs were tried and sentenced, as were soldiers in Jaca who did not participate but did not try to stop the insurgents. Sediles was condemned to death. He was condemned in absentia. A campaign was launched to obtain a pardon for Sedilles after the sentence by the military tribunal in Jaca on 18 March 1931 became known. He was pardoned before the popular demonstrations spread across Spain on the eve of the municipal elections.

On 20 May 1931 captains Sediles, Salinas, Gallo and Arboledas filed requests with the Ministry of War to be able to withdraw from the army. In the elections to the Constituent Cortes in June 1931 Sediles was elected as candidate of the Extrema Izquierda Federal (Federal Extreme Left) as deputy for the province of Barcelona. Captain Sediles played a prominent roles as a left-wing republican leader in 1931 and 1932. In 1932 Sediles and others of the extreme left such as Antonio Jiménez, José Antonio Balbotín^{(es)}, Ramón Franco, Ángel Samblancat^{(es)} and Rodrigo Soriano^{(es)} formed the Left Alliance under the leadership of Eduardo Barriobero y Herrán. As a dissident radical republican Barriobero was an active critic of the government, and earned the enmity of its leadership until the end of the civil war.

At the start of the Spanish Civil War the Confederación Nacional del Trabajo (CNT) formed the Águilas de la Libertad militia based in Madrid in 1936 with 400 men under Sediles. There were just over 300 militiamen in Toledo. The anarchists Francisco Tortosa and Benito Pavón were among the leaders. Sediles died in Toledo in 1936. He died in a car accident soon after the start of the civil war, the day after the Siege of the Alcazar.

== Publications ==
- Salvador Sediles (1920), "¡Resignación hermanos!", Argüello, Madrid: Libertad Type Libro: 32
- Salvador Sediles (1931), ¡Voy a decir la verdad!, Madrid
- Salvador Sediles (1932), "Las calaveras de plomo", La Novela Proletaria

== Sources ==
- Azpiroz Pascual, José María (December 2000), "La sublevación de Jaca", Trébede, Cremallo de ediciones S.L., archived from the original on 2018-05-20
- Barriobero y Herran (2015-06-02), El Tribunal Revolucionario de Barcelona (1936-1937) (in Spanish), Ediciones Espuela de Plata, ISBN 978-84-96956-63-6
- "Batallón Águilas de la Libertad (Madrid, España)", Pares (in Spanish), Ministry of Education, Culture and Sports
- Gallo Martínez, Miguel (20 May 2014), "1931 (Historia De Un Año Decisivo)", De Castro ero y bailar no sepo
- "Jaca, sublevación de, (1930)", GEA: Gran Enciclopedia Aragonesa (in Spanish), DiCom Medios SL., archived from the original on 2021-04-10
- Kelsey, Graham (1991-11-30), Anarchosyndicalism, Libertarian Communism and the State: The CNT in Zaragoza and Aragon, 1930-1937, Springer Science & Business Media, ISBN 978-0-7923-0275-9
- Pueo, Juan Carlos (2016-08-08), Como un motor de avión: Biografía literaria de Enrique Jardiel Poncela (in Spanish), Editorial Verbum, ISBN 978-84-9074-375-1
- "Sediles Moreno, Salvador (1897-1936)", Pares, Ministry of Education, Culture and Sports
