= Si me quieres escribir =

Spanish Civil War song

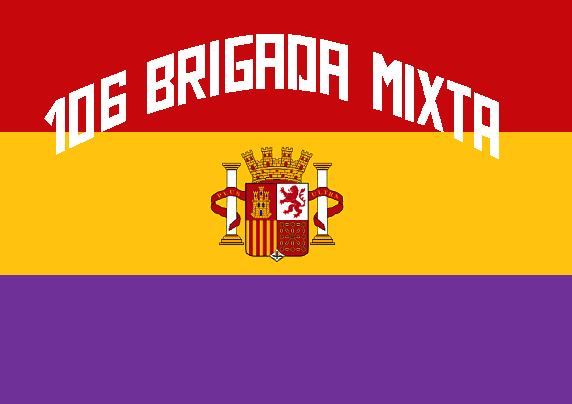
- Flag of a mixed brigade of the Spanish Republic

Song
- Language: Spanish
- English title: "Battle at Gandesa"

"Si me quieres escribir" (English: "If You Want to Write to Me"), also known as "Ya sabes mi paradero" ("You Know Where I Am Posted") and "El frente de Gandesa" (The Gandesa Front), is one of the most famous songs of the Spanish Republican troops during the Spanish Civil War. According to Emilia Salas Viú, widow of Rodolfo Halffter, the author of the lyrics was Emilio Prados.

== Background ==
The melody is based on a former song of the Spanish military units in the Rif Wars in Northern Morocco in the 1920s. The lyrics may change according to the location of the combat and the units involved. The Gandesa front and the blowing up of pontoons and bridges are related to the passage of the river in the Battle of the Ebro, also mentioned in ¡Ay Carmela!. The Spanish Republican combat engineers were capable of repeatedly repairing the bridges and pontoons in order to allow the loyalist troops to cross the river —at least a few hours every day— despite the steady bombings of the Nazi Condor Legion and the Italian Aviazione Legionaria, as well as the intentional flooding by releasing water from dams upstream.

The moros (Moors) mentioned in some verses are the Regulares, the feared Moroccan shock troop units of the Nationalist faction that kept pounding Republican positions for months at the Gandesa frontline.

== Lyrics ==
- The main stanza begins mostly with Si me quieres escribir; it is usually repeated at the end. Also every pair of verses is repeated twice. There are many different stanzas and these may be subject to local variations and be sung in different combinations. The following are some of the most common:

| Si me quieres escribir, Ya sabes mi paradero: Tercera Brigada Mixta, Primera línea de fuego. Aunque me tiren el puente Y también la pasarela Me verás pasar el Ebro En un barquito de vela. Diez mil veces que los tiren Diez mil veces pasaremos Que para eso nos ayudan Los del Cuerpo de Ingenieros. En la venta de Gandesa Hay un moro Mojamé Que te dice: «Pasa, "paisa" ¿Qué quieres para comer?» El primer plato que dan Son granadas rompedoras, Y el segundo de metralla Para recobrar memoria. | If you want to write to me, You know where I am located: The Third Mixed Brigade, In the first line of fire. Even if they blast my bridge And also the pontoon, You will see me crossing the Ebro River: In a little sailboat. They may blast them ten thousand times Ten thousand times we shall go across them, That's why we get help from The ones from the Corps of Engineers. At the Gandesa inn There is Mohamed, a Moor, Who tells one: "Come in, fellow! What do you wish to eat?" The first course they give Are fragmentation grenades, And the second are shrapnel shells, To refresh one's memory. |

=== Variants ===
One popular Civil War variant of this song where the lyrics make reference to the Siege of Madrid is known as "Los Emboscados". These are two of the main stanzas:

| Cuando vamos de permiso, Lo primero que se ve, Son milicianos de pega Que están tomando café. Los moros que trajo Franco En Madrid quieren entrar. Mientras quede un miliciano Los moros no pasarán. | When we go on leave (to Madrid), The first thing one sees, Are fake militiamen That are drinking coffee. The Moors that Franco brought, Want to enter Madrid As long as one militiaman remains, The Moors will not get through. |

The first stanza of "Los emboscados" is an adaptation of an older variant of 1936 that was not related to the war:

| Cuando entras en Madrid Lo primero que se ve Son los chulos con bigote Sentados en el café | When one enters Madrid, The first thing one sees, Are the moustachioed Chulos Sitting at the café. |

== See also ==
- Songs of the Spanish Civil War
- Canciones de la Guerra Civil Española
- The Ballad of the Fallen
- To All We Stretch the Open Arm
