= Fermín Galán =

Spanish soldier

Fermín Galán Rodríguez
- Born: 4 October 1899; San Fernando, Cádiz, Spain
- Died: 14 December 1930 (aged 31); Huesca, Spain
- Cause of death: Execution by firing squad
- Occupation: Soldier
- Known for: Leader of the Jaca uprising

Fermín Galán Rodríguez (4 October 1899 – 14 December 1930) was a Spanish soldier known for leading the failed Jaca uprising a few months before the foundation of the Second Spanish Republic. He was of peasant origins, although his father was in the Navy. His father died when he was 10, and soon after he was enrolled in a boarding school for military orphans. This prepared him for military academy, and in 1918 he graduated as a lieutenant. He served in Morocco, where he learned Arabic, gained a reputation as an African expert and was promoted to Captain.

While recovering from a serious wound in 1925 Galán conceived the idea of overthrowing the monarchist dictatorship of General Primo de Rivera and establishing a republic. The next year he helped to plan a coup. The plot was detected and he was imprisoned for 3 1/2 years until January 1930. He was then assigned to the remote posting of Jaca in northern Aragon, where he developed plans for another coup attempt, this time coordinated with civilian strikes and demonstrations. The revolt was launched prematurely on 12 December 1930, was poorly organized and was quickly suppressed. Galán was executed after a hasty court martial on 14 December 1930. However, the revolt sparked upheavals that led to declaration of the Second Spanish Republic a few months later.

== Childhood and youth (1899–1915) ==
Fermín Galán Rodríguez was born in San Fernando, Cádiz, on 4 October 1899. He was the third of five children: Francisca, Juan Ramón (died young), Fermín, Francisco and José María. His father, Juan Galán Mateo, was the son of poor peasants from a small village near San Fernando. He had become a Constable of the Navy. His mother was the oldest of three daughters of a San Fernando baker. Fermín Galán grew up among liberals who believed in republicanism and had lukewarm Catholicism.

His father, who was often absent on long sea voyages, died in the spring of 1909. His mother moved to Madrid where she supplemented a small pension by working as a seamstress in private homes. She enrolled Fermín in the Colegio de Huérfanos de Guerra, a boarding school for orphans of war, when he was 11. He was followed by his brothers as they became old enough. The school was designed to prepare its pupils for entry into military academies, emphasising discipline and sports, particularly gymnastics. His two brothers would also pursue military careers. Francisco Galán became a colonel in the Republican army, and José María Galán was in command of the XI and XII Army Corps.

== Early military career (1915–25) ==
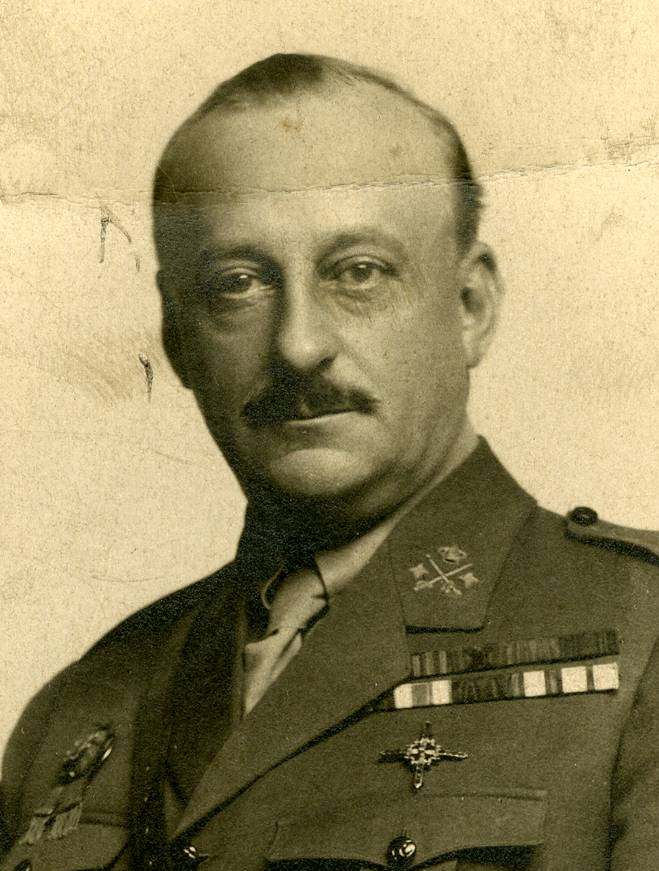
Miguel Primo de Rivera. Galán wanted to overthrow his dictatorship.

In 1915, at the age of 15, Galán entered the Toledo Infantry Academy in the Alcázar, one of the few students of peasant or worker origins. When he was 18 he became a second lieutenant and joined the Guipúzcoa No. 53 Infantry Regiment in Vitoria. He disliked the low level of general education in the regiment and its use in repressing workers' movements and demonstrations. He obtained a transfer to the Barbastro No 4. Cazadores Regiment in the Tétouan garrison of the Spanish protectorate in Morocco, where Spain had been fighting the Riffians since 1912. During the year and a half spent on defensive duties Galán devoured books on sociology and learned how the Russian Revolution had emancipated the workers and peasants. In 1921 he joined the troops of the Ceuta Indigenous Police, where he remained for two years. He was promoted to lieutenant and learned Arabic.

Galán wrote a proposal for a political-military plan to end the war in Morocco. This was rejected by the higher command, but they recognised his ability, in October 1922 gave him first class cross of military merit with a red badge, and would send to ask for his opinions on various subjects. In April–August 1923 he was in Madrid while waiting to take a post with the Wad-Ras nº50 Regiment, and presented his project to the Africanist League. The king listened to his views, then sent him to the Minister of War. At this point the military uprising of General Miguel Primo de Rivera put an end to the project. Galán was posted to Gomara in the Jalifianos Service. He had a reputation as an African expert, wrote articles in the Colonial Troops Magazine, and was a spokesman for the Africanist officers. In April 1924 he was assigned to the 3rd Foreign Legion, where he was frequently cited for his courage.

Galán was seriously injured in action in the Kabylie. He was evacuated to the Military Hospital in Madrid. During his stay in hospital and subsequent convalescence he became disillusioned with the dictatorship of Primo de Rivera and began to seriously consider conspiracy to restore the Republic. He wrote a historical and autobiographical novel at this time, La barbarie organizada (Organized Barbarism), about the colonial war in Morocco. In April 1925 he was discharged and spent two months in Ceuta, then for a short period was in Madrid before being promoted to captain and assigned to the Luchana nº28 Infantry Regiment in Tarragona, which he joined on 13 August 1925, aged 25.

== Conspiracy (1925–30) ==
As a member of the conspiracy to destroy the dictatorship he often visited Madrid. An uprising was planned for 24 June 1926, San Juan day. He requested three days leave on 21 June 1926. However, the "Sanjuanada" plot was discovered and on 23 June 1926 many of the participants were arrested. The leaders, including Melquiades Álvarez and the Count of Romanones, were only fined. General Weyler was acquitted and General Francisco Aguilera y Egea received a light sentence. Colonel Segundo García was given eight years in prison, while Captain Galán and other officers were sentenced to six years in Barcelona.

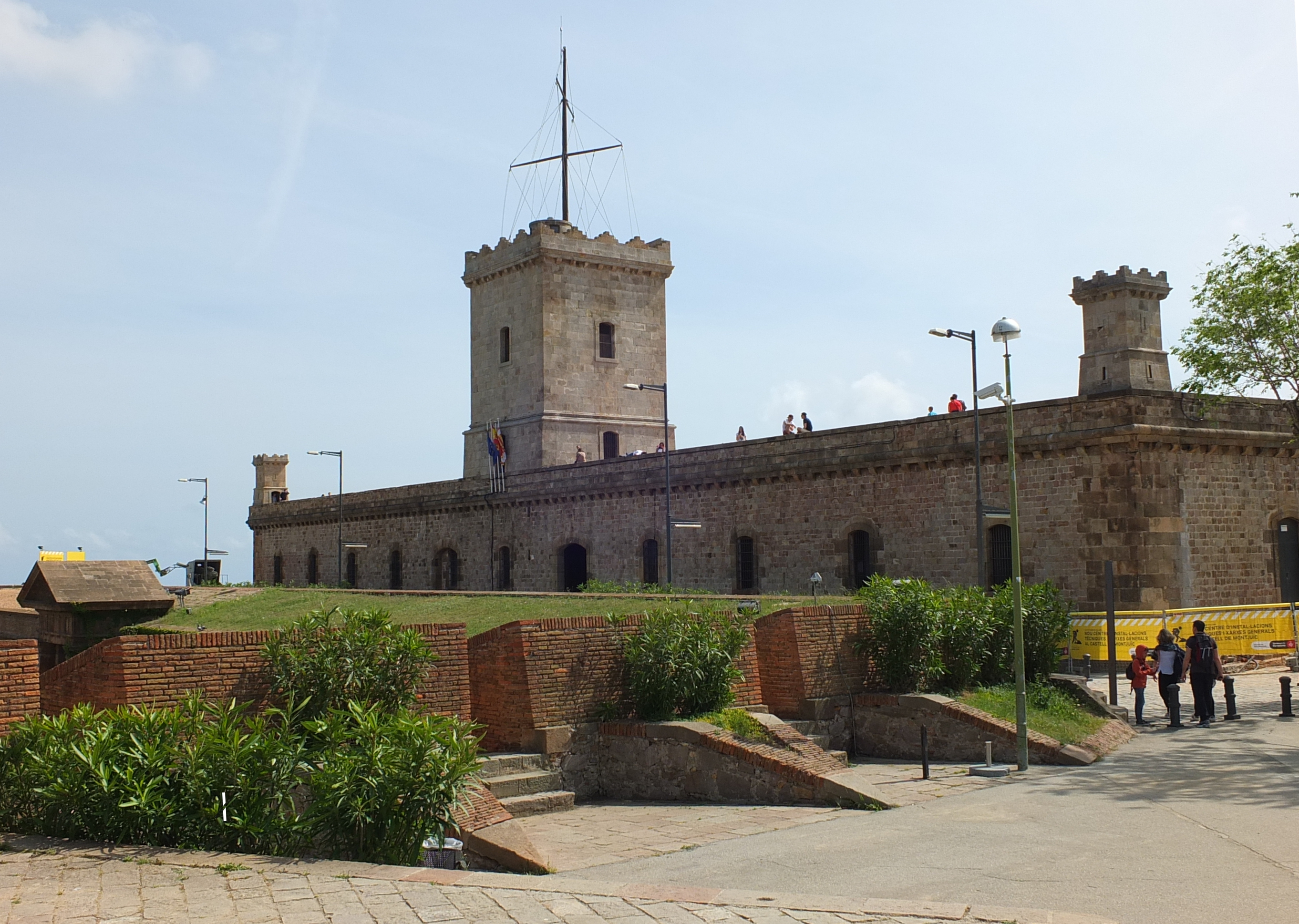
Montjuïc Castle, Barcelona. Galán was imprisoned here for 3 1/2 years.

While in San Francisco prison in Madrid, and then in Montjuïc Castle, Galán remained in contact with the movement opposed to the dictator and monarchy, and began to think about a combined civilian and military movement. He made contact with some of the Catalan union leaders. On 21 December 1926 he joined the Freemasons. General Primo de Rivera was replaced by General Berenguer at the end of January 1930. Berenguer gave an amnesty for the participants in the "Sanjuanada" plot. Galán was released and at first lived in Barcelona, where he collaborated with workers' organizations and contributed to the socialist press. He published Escribe Nueva Creación, an essay on political, economic and social doctrine that advocated a federal republican system. The essay proposed that the community itself should administer wealth, and that Spain should be part of a United States of Europe.

Galán was assigned to Jaca in June 1930, an isolated posting where the authorities hoped he would not cause problems. He still wanted to link a military uprising with the political movements opposed to the dictatorship. He established contacts with the CNT in Zaragoza and Huesca, and started a close friendship with the syndicalist leader Ramón Acín of Huesca. When the National Revolutionary Committee (CRN) was created in October 1930, Galán traveled to Madrid to meet the CRN leaders, and was appointed delegate of the CRN in Aragon. From that time he mounted a campaign to get the CRN to support a military uprising at a national level combined with popular demonstrations, but was frustrated by constant postponements of the date.

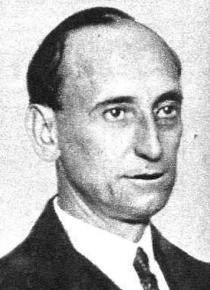
Santiago Casares Quiroga did not tell Galán in time of the delay in the coup date.

Galán called the Executive Revolutionary Committee politicians the "telephoners", and did not want to rely on them to take action. The date of 12 December 1930 was finally agreed, and then was postponed by the CRN to 15 December 1930. The CRN representative Santiago Casares Quiroga knew of the decision to delay the uprising and came to Jaca late of the night of 11–12 December but did not notify Galán. Casares thought Galán already knew of the delay, and that they could discuss the new plans any time the next day. Quiroga, who was accompanied by Graco Marsá, took a room at the La Palma hotel instead of the Mur hotel where Galan was staying. Marsá thought they should contact Galán, but Quiroga said he was tired out from the long journey and they should sleep first.

== Jaca uprising (1930) ==
Galán launched the uprising in Jaca in the early hours of 12 December. He was accepted as leader without reservation by most of the soldiers in Jaca, who would follow him anywhere. At least sixty officers and NCOs in Jaca supported him. That night several officers met in Galan's room in the Mur hotel and worked out the last details of the plan. The officers called out the troops at 5:00 a.m., arrested the military governor, killed two carabineros and a Civil Guard sergeant who opposed them, and took control of the telephone exchange, post office and railway station. At 11:00 a.m. they proclaimed the Republic at the Town Hall.

Two columns were organized to travel to Huesca. One led by Galán would go by road, while the other led by Salvador Sediles would take the railway. Delays in requisition of transport held back the departure from Jaca until 3:00 p.m. Around 5:00 p.m. General Manuel de las Heras with some civil guards met Galán's column at the height of Anzánigo^{(es)}. He tried to turn back the column of 500 men by force, and some shots were fired before the column resumed its slow advance. When they reached Ayerbe the insurgents took control of the telephone and telegraph stations, neutralized the civil guard and proclaimed the Republic.

The column of 300 soldiers led by Sediles joined Galán's column at Ayerbe, and the combined force then moved towards Huesca. At dawn on 13 December 1930 at the heights of Cillas, about 3 kilometres (1.9 mi) from Huesca, the rebels found themselves confronted by the government force. Galán had a choice of fighting or negotiating. Since he thought many of the opposing troops were under officers committed to the uprising, he chose the latter. Captain Ángel García Hernández and Captain Salinas were driven across the line in a car with a white flag. When they arrived and said they wanted to parley with the officers they were immediately arrested. The government troops then began to fire on the insurgents. Galán refused to order a counterattack because "brothers cannot fight each other", and ordered withdrawal. The rebel force disintegrated. Galán voluntarily surrendered in Biscarrués with other rebels and arrived in Ayerbe about 10:00 p.m. on 13 December.

== Death and legend ==
On 14 December in a short court martial captains Galán and García Hernández were condemned to death, while other officers were sentenced to life imprisonment. At his trial Galán was asked if he had accomplices. He replied that he did, and they were the cowards who were trying him. Galán and García Hernández were shot in a courtyard in Huesca at 3:00 p.m. on 14 December 1930. They chose to die while facing the firing squad without blindfolds. Galan waved to the executioners and said "Until Never!" just before they fired. The execution provoked outrage against the regime. The poet Rafael Alberti wrote later,

During the first months of the year 1931, the echoes of the executioners' bullets that had cut down Captain Galán and Captain García Hernández were still heard throughout Spain, and such terrorism momentarily obscured the path along which people had begun to move. With almost the entire future government of the Republic in the Model Prison, no one could imagine that a tidal wave was forming beneath the surface and that the water would burst forth, like a fountain and fireworks display, on that fateful April 4th.

Galán and García Hernández became heroes of the Second Republic, founded on 14 April 1931, with their portraits displayed in council chambers and the homes of workers throughout Spain. Rafael Alberti composed a romancero commemorating the two heroes in 1931, and soon after converted the ballads into a play called Fermín Galán to be performed by the company of Margarita Xirgu. Galán's own melodrama Berta was performed with great success in Madrid in April 1932. A film was made about Galán in which at the end his body was covered with a Republican tricolor flag by a woman who represented the Republic.

== Publications ==
- Fermín Galán (1930), Nueva creación; política ya no sólo es arte, sino ciencia (in Spanish) (1 ed.), Barcelona: Cervantes, p. 201
  - Fermín Galán (1931), Nueva creación : política ya no sólo es arte, sino ciencia (in Spanish) (4 ed.), Madrid: R. Caro Raggio
- Fermín Galán (1931), La Barbarie organizada : Novela del tercio (in Spanish), prólogo por Francisco Galán, Madrid: Ed. Castro, p. 239
- Fermín Galán (1932), Berta; drama en cinco actos (in Spanish)
- Fermín Galán (1934), Cartas de Fermín Galán (Letters) (in Spanish), Madrid: Castro, p. 210

== Sources ==
- Alberti, Rafael (1981), Alberti, University of California Press, ISBN 978-0-520-04265-0
- Azpiroz Pascual, José María (December 2000), "La sublevación de Jaca", Trébede, Cremallo de ediciones S.L., archived from the original on 2018-05-20
- Casanova, Julián (2010-07-29), The Spanish Republic and Civil War, Cambridge University Press, ISBN 978-1-139-49057-3
- Espina, Antonio (22 April 1932), ""Berta" de Fermín Galán", Luz (in Spanish), Madrid
- "Fermín Galán", Biografías y Vidas (in Spanish)
- Forrest, Andrew (2012-11-12), The Spanish Civil War, Routledge, ISBN 978-1-134-67442-8
- "Jaca republicana", Jaca.com (in Spanish), editorial Pirineum
- "Jaca, sublevación de, (1930)", GEA: Gran Enciclopedia Aragonesa (in Spanish), DiCom Medios SL.
- Gómez, Esteban (2007), "Semblanza Biográfica de Fermín Galán Rodríguez" (PDF), Rolde: Revista de cultura aragonesa (123), ISSN 1133-6676, archived from the original (PDF) on 2008-07-03
- Kelsey, Graham (1991-11-30), Anarchosyndicalism, Libertarian Communism and the State: The CNT in Zaragoza and Aragon, 1930-1937, Springer Science & Business Media, ISBN 978-0-7923-0275-9
- Paz, Abel (2007), Durruti in the Spanish Revolution, AK Press, ISBN 978-1-904859-50-5
- Popkin, Louise B. (1975), The Theatre of Rafael Alberti, Tamesis, ISBN 978-0-7293-0004-9
- Thompson, Michael (2007), Performing Spanishness: History, Cultural Identity and Censorship in the Theatre of José María Rodríguez Méndez, Intellect Books, ISBN 978-1-84150-134-5
