= José María Galán =

Spanish military officer (1904–1978)

- Born: José María Galán Rodriguéz; 1904
- Died: 1978 (aged 73–74)
- Military career
- Allegiance: (Second Spanish Republic) Spanish Republic
- Branch: Army
- Rank: Major
- Commands: Commander of a militia column (1936), Mixed brigade (1936), 34th division (1937), XXIII Corps (1938).
- Conflicts: Spanish Civil War: Battle of Guadarrama; Siege of Madrid; Second Battle of the Corunna Road; Segovia Offensive

José María Galán Rodríguez (1904–1978) was a Spanish military officer. He served in the Spanish Civil War. He was the brother of Fermín Galán, leader of the Jaca Uprising, and Francisco Galán. Before the war, he was a lieutenant of the Carabineros.

== Civil war ==
José María Galán remained loyal to the Spanish government during the coup of July 1936 that triggered the Civil War. In July 1936, he led a militia column in the Somosierra front. In October 1936 he led the 3rd Mixed Brigade, one of the first such units to be established.

Later he took part in the Second Battle of the Corunna Road. In June 1937 he led the 34th Division in the Segovia Offensive. In 1938, he led the XXIII Army Corps in Andalusia.

After the war, he fled to the USSR and later exiled himself to Cuba. He died there in 1978.

== See also ==
- 3rd Mixed Brigade
- José_María_Galán (Spanish)
