= Saint Leticia =

Christian saint and martyr

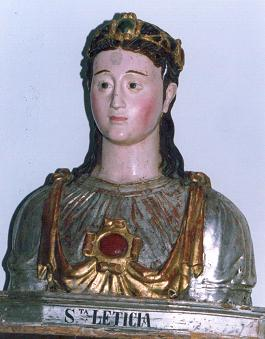
- Bust of Saint Leticia, Ayerbe, Spain

Martyr
- Born: Unknown
- Died: Unknown
- Feast: October 21 or March 13 in some calendars
- Patronage: Ayerbe

Leticia (Latin: Laetitia; Italian: Letizia), whose feast day is October 21, is venerated as a virgin martyr and saint, presumably a companion of Ursula. A saint with the same name had a feast day occurring on March 13 and July 9. Her cult was diffused in Corsica ("Letizia" was the name of Napoleon's mother) and can be found in medieval England (Saint Letycie, Lititia). A center of her cult in Spain is the Aragonese town of Ayerbe.

The fiesta of Saint Leticia takes place around September 9 and lasts for four to six days. A sculpture of Leticia is carried in procession, its pedestal garlanded with grapes; figures of giants and cabezudos (figures with gigantic heads) parade in the streets and pyrotechnic figures of bulls race through the town every night.

The marriage of Letizia Ortiz to king Felipe VI of Spain is said to have sparked new interest in the cult of this saint.

== Relics ==
Leticia's relics can be found in Ayerbe in a reliquary of engraved silver dating from the 16th century. There is a small opening, which the faithful can kiss. The reliquary was a gift from Don Pedro Forcada, a native of Ayerbe, who served as a canon of the cathedral of Tarazona. Thus, the reliquary features the coat-of-arms of the Forcada family.

== See also ==
- Fiestas de Santa Leticia
