= Els Arcs (Bellvís) =

- Locality
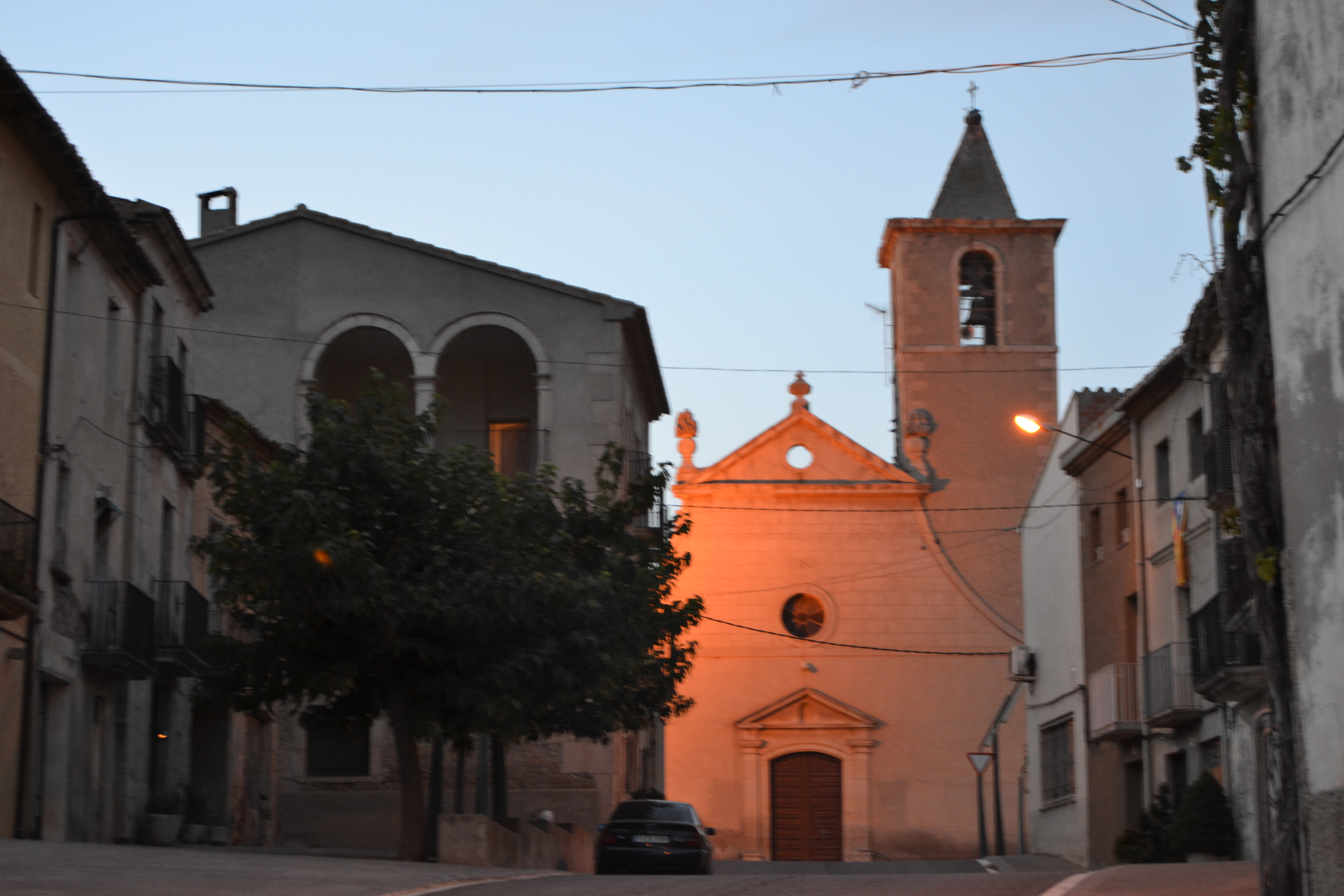

- Location within Province of Lleida Location within Catalonia Location within Spain
- Coordinates: 41°41′38″N 0°49′56″E
- Country: Spain
- Community: Catalonia
- Province: Lleida
- Municipality: Bellvís
- Elevation: 216 m (709 ft)

Population
  - Total: 142

Els Arcs is a locality located in the municipality of Bellvís, in Province of Lleida province, Catalonia, Spain. As of 2020, it has a population of 142.

== Geography ==
Els Arcs is located 33 kilometres (21 mi) east-northeast of Lleida.
