= Carlos F. Galán =

Spanish-born writer (1831-1906)

Carlos F. Galán (1831 in Cadiz, Spain – October 1906 in Mexico City) was a Spanish-born writer, jurist and newspaper publisher in California and Mexico. He was an interpreter and translator of English, French, Spanish, and Italian.

Galán was married to Laura H. Galán, and had twelve biological children, and two adopted sons. He resided in Mazatlan and Sinaloa, with his family until 1872.

== Early life ==
Galán was born in Spain in 1831, In 1845, his family emigrated to Mexico. That same year, he started attending the military academy in Chapultepec in Mexico City. While in the academy, he was promoted to lieutenant for the Mexican Army. He fought for Mexico during the Mexican–American War in 1846–1848.

== Political life ==
After the war, Galán moved to San Francisco. He began to study law, was admitted to the bar and practiced in that city. In the 1850s Galán worked in the gold fields during the California gold rush. He soon discovered that the working and living conditions for Mexicans were unbearable.

Galán eventually returned to practicing law. He was a Chief Justice of Lower California as well as a member of its congress. In September 1867, he was elected as governor of Baja California, but for one year only. He became ex-Officio governor of the same territory until May 1868.In 1870, Galán moved back to California.

Galán died in Mexico City in October 1906.

== Abra case ==
Galán was involved in a case concerning claims made regarding the Abra Silver Mining Company. Galán gave his testimony at Washington DC on the third of January 1874. Because of his work in the newspaper and as a lawyer, he investigated happenings pertaining to this particular mining company. He translated and wrote down the depositions of several witnesses for the case regarding the claims that alleged damages had been sustained in consequence of particular acts and omissions of duty upon the part of official representatives of Republic of Mexico.

== Prominent works ==
. He founded the first English and Spanish newspaper in lower California, called La Baja California. He published the first large weekly in Sinaloa, called the Occidental . From 1869 to 1872, Galán was also involved in another newspaper called La Voz de Pueblo, in Maztalan. Galán was a well educated man, and used his skills to edit several newspapers in Baja California and Sinaloa. He showed a predilection as a contributor for both an editor and a writer. Galan became editor of the newspaper La Voz del Nuevo Mundo in 1881 for one year. Galán wrote a series of sketches called "Recuerdos de California", (Memories of California), that were published on May 21, May 28, and June 11, 1881, in La Voz del Nuevo Mundo. These stories are narrated by the perceptive of a former Sonora mining camp resident.

== Significance in American Literature ==
Galán contributed to American literature through his short prose narratives in Spanish print culture coming out of California. His works show the cross-roads of U.S. and hemispheric U.S. literary history. Specifically, his three sketches titled "Recuerdos de California" (Memories of California) provide a look at the multinational working class community in California and a look at how the Latino/a community without privilege experienced the new order of U.S. dominance. Since the work dates to the late 19th Century, the focus on the region of California allows for a demonstration of the Latino/a community only a couple of decades removed from the aftermath of the U.S.-Mexican War. (See Treaty of Guadalupe-Hidalgo) Additionally, as editor of La Voz del Nuevo Mundo, Galán focused the newspaper on themes of Latino/a modernity and cosmopolitanism in order to demonstrate the participation of the Latino/a community in the U.S. to modernity.

== Bibliography ==
- Cutler, John A. "Confronting Frontier and Industrial Violence: Latino Narratives". The Heath Anthology of American Literature. edited by Paul Lauter, Seventh ed.999-1002. Wadsworth, Boston, MA. 2014
- Cutler, John A. "Toward a Reading of Nineteenth-Century Latino/a Short Fiction." The Latino Nineteenth Century, edited by Rodrigo Lazo & Jesse Aléman, New York University Press, 2016, pp. 124–145.
