= Bellvís =

- Municipality
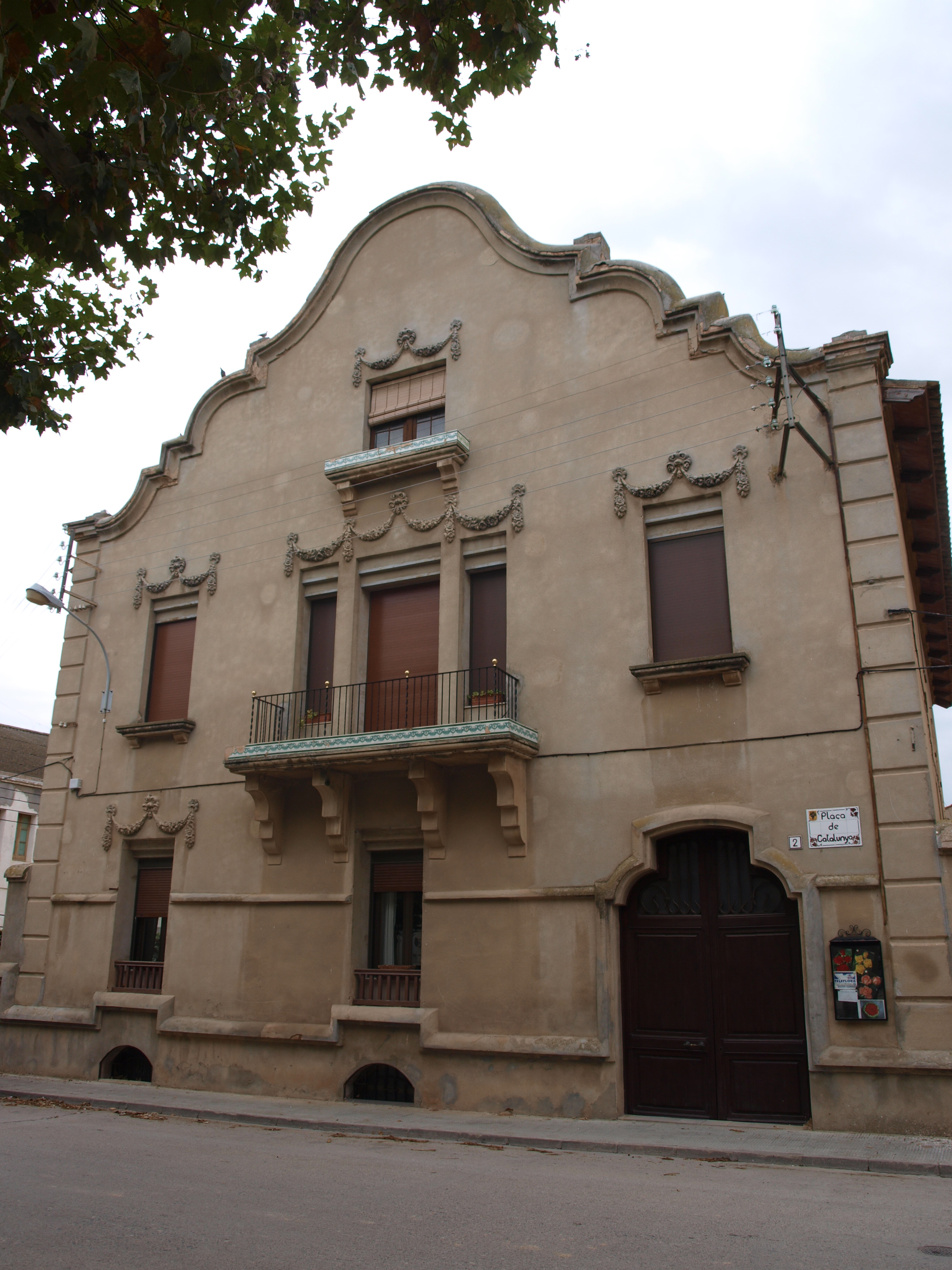
- Cal Calvet, significant building in the village

- Coat of arms

- Location in the Province of Lleida Location in Catalonia Location in Spain
- Coordinates: 41°40′N 0°49′E
- Country: Spain
- Community: Catalonia
- Province: Lleida
- Comarca: Pla d'Urgell

Government
  - Mayor: Joan Talarn Gilabert (2015)

Area
  - Total: 46.7 km^{2} (18.0 sq mi)
- Elevation: 207 m (679 ft)

Population (2025-01-01)
  - Total: 2,249
  - Density: 48.2/km^{2} (125/sq mi)
- Website: bellvis.cat

Bellvís (Old Catalan for 'beautiful sight'; Catalan pronunciation: [beʎˈβis]) is a village in the province of Lleida and autonomous community of Catalonia. The municipality has an exclave to the north-east, Remolins, among other minor settlements, some of which are now uninhabited.

== Population centres ==
- Bellvís, with 2.134 inhabitants
- Els Arcs, with 160 inhabitants
- Other minor settlements include Remolins, Les Tarroges, Safareig, Gatén, La Quadra d’Arrufat, El Saladar, Gaveta, Les Planes, El Negral, L’Erol and El Comú.
