= Demetrio Galán Bergua =

Spanish physician, humanist, and journalist

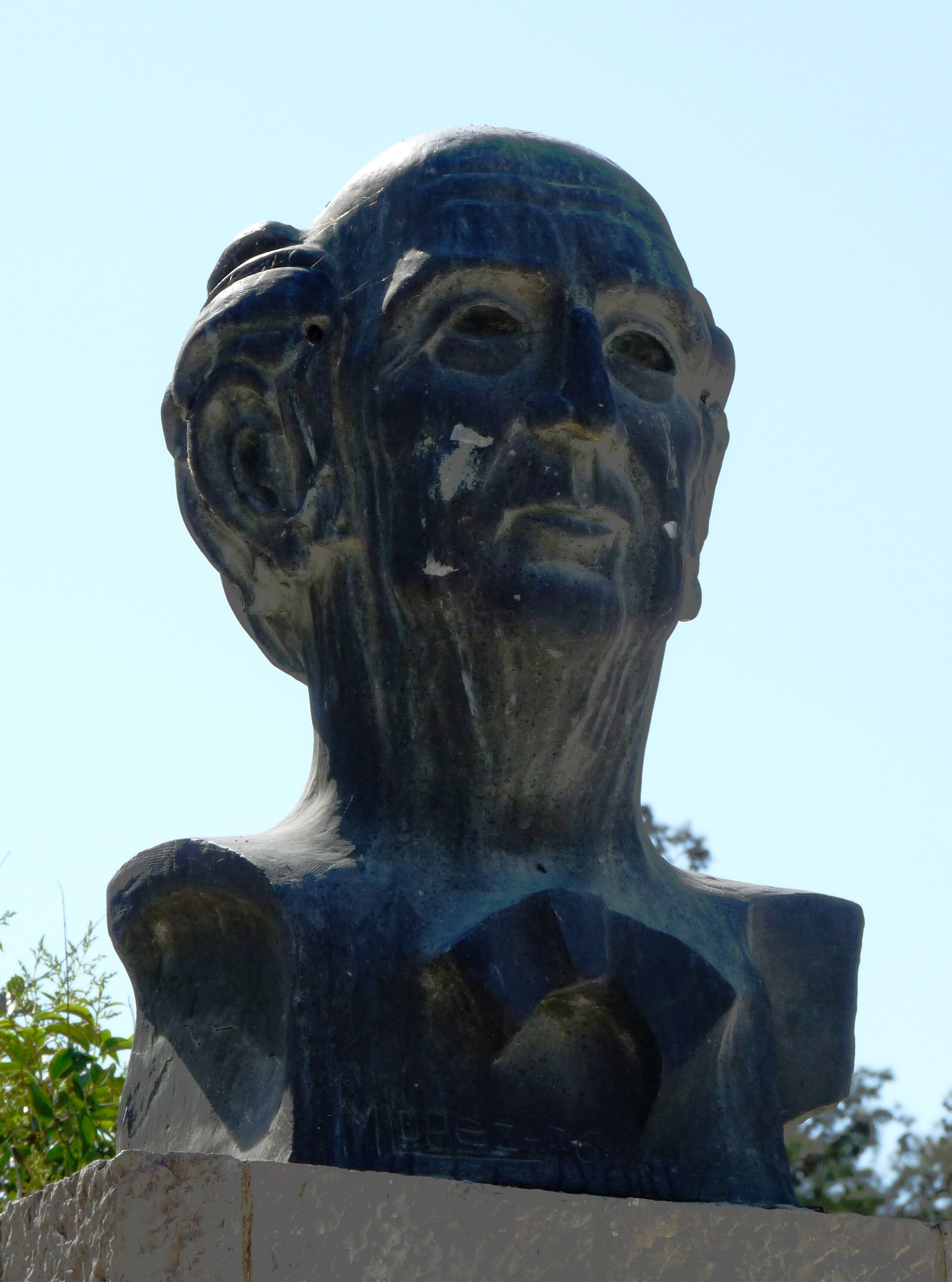
Zaragoza - Bust of Demetrio Galán Bergua: "To Demetrio Galán Bergua / Apostle of the jota / The El Cachirulo associations of Spain and Venezuela"

Demetrio Galán Bergua (1894 – 1970) was a Spanish physician, humanist, journalist, and leading scholar of Aragonese folklore. He was born and died in Zaragoza, Spain.

== Education and medical career ==
Galán Bergua completed his primary and secondary education in Zaragoza, earning a medical degree from the University of Zaragoza in 1917. He had also completed his musical studies in 1914. He worked as a rural physician in Mendigorría (Navarre), Sotés (La Rioja), Biescas and Sallent de Gállego (Huesca), and Illueca (Zaragoza) before moving to Madrid, where he earned his doctorate in 1925.

In 1930, he returned to Zaragoza and settled in Las Delicias neighborhood, where he practiced medicine for nearly forty years.

== Cultural and literary activities ==
A prominent figure in Aragonese culture, he and his brother Pedro were lecturers and leading figures in the cultural life of Zaragoza and Aragon. He also wrote several plays and composed the music for two zarzuelas. In 1933, he founded the magazine La casa del médico ("The Doctor's House"), serving as its editor-in-chief. He later became a medical columnist for Heraldo de Aragón, where he also published articles on Aragonese topics.

His most significant contribution was the promotion and study of the Aragonese jota, a traditional musical and dance from Aragon. To support its study and dissemination, he founded the Amigos de la Jota association in 1953 and the Peña del Cachirulo in 1964, serving as president of both organizations until his death. For many years, his talks on the jota were broadcast on Radio Zaragoza, contributing to the dissemination of knowledge about this traditional art form.

In 1966, Galán Bergua published his major work El libro de la jota aragonesa, a historical, critical, analytical, descriptive, and anthological study of the musical genre.

== Honours and legacy ==
Galán Bergua's professional and cultural achievements earned him several distinctions during his lifetime, including the Premio San Jorge and the title of Hijo Predilecto de Zaragoza. He was also recognized as an Aragonés Ejemplar and received the honorary title of Jotero Mayor del Reino ("Chief Jotero of the Kingdom").

His legacy is particularly associated with the preservation and study of Aragonese folklore, especially through the continuation of jota traditions and the "Demetrio Galán Bergua" Aragonese Jota Competition, organized by Radio Zaragoza from 1980 to 1999.
