= Francisco Galán =

Spanish military officer (1902–1971)

- Born: Francisco Galán Rodríguez; 1902; San Fernando, Andalusia, Spain
- Died: 1971 (aged 68–69); Buenos Aires, Argentina
- Military career
- Allegiance: (Second Spanish Republic) Spanish Republic
- Branch: Spanish Republican Army
- Rank: Major
- Commands: 3rd Mixed Brigade (1936); 14th Army Corps (1937); XX Corps (1938); XII Corps (1939)
- Conflicts: Spanish Civil War: Siege of Madrid; Asturias Offensive; Battle of Teruel; Catalonia Offensive; Cartagena Uprising; Final offensive of the Spanish Civil War

Francisco Galán Rodríguez (1902–1971) was a Spanish military officer.

== Early life ==
He was the brother of Captain Fermin Galán and the Republican Majors José Maria and Juan Galán. Before the Spanish Civil War he was a lieutenant of the Spanish Civil Guard.

== Spanish Civil War ==
In July 1936 he remained loyal to the Republican government and led one Militia column in the Somosierra front. In November 1936 he led the 3rd Mixed Brigade of the Spanish Republican Army during the Battle of Madrid. In August 1937 he was one of the Republican commanders in Asturias and in September 1937 he led the 14th Army Corps in the Asturias Campaign and on October he fled on board a fishing boat in order to avoid capture by the Nationalists. After that, in February 1938 he led the XX Corps in the Battle of Teruel, replacing Leopoldo Menéndez and he led the XII Corps during the Catalonia Offensive. On March 3, 1939, he was appointed military commander of Cartagena, but on March 4 he was arrested by the supporters of Casado during the Cartagena Uprising. On March 6 he fled from Cartagena to Bizerte on board a republican ship.

== Exile ==
After the end of the war, he fled to Argentina and lived there until his death in 1971.
