= Biscarrués =

- Flag Coat of arms

- Location of Biscarrués in Aragon and in Spain Biscarrués (Spain)
- Coordinates: 42°13′37.87″N 0°45′4.08″W
- Country: Spain
- Autonomous community: Aragon
- Province: Huesca
- Municipality: Biscarrués

Area
  - Total: 30 km^{2} (12 sq mi)

Population (2025-01-01)
  - Total: 188
  - Density: 6.3/km^{2} (16/sq mi)
- Time zone: UTC+1 (CET)
  - Summer (DST): UTC+2 (CEST)

Biscarrués is a municipality located in the province of Huesca, Aragon, Spain. According to the 2004 census (INE), the municipality has a population of 232 inhabitants.

== See also ==
- List of municipalities in Huesca
