= Ayerbe =

Ayerbe, Spain
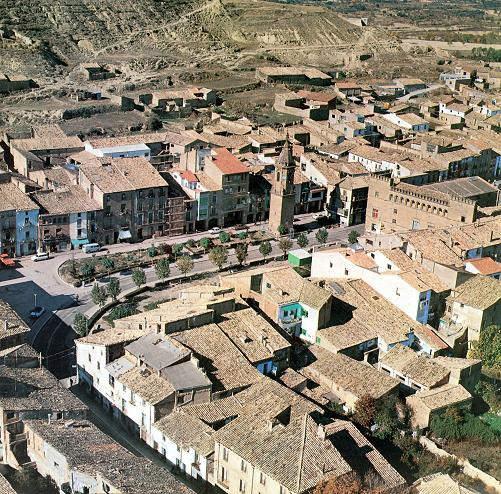

- Flag Coat of arms

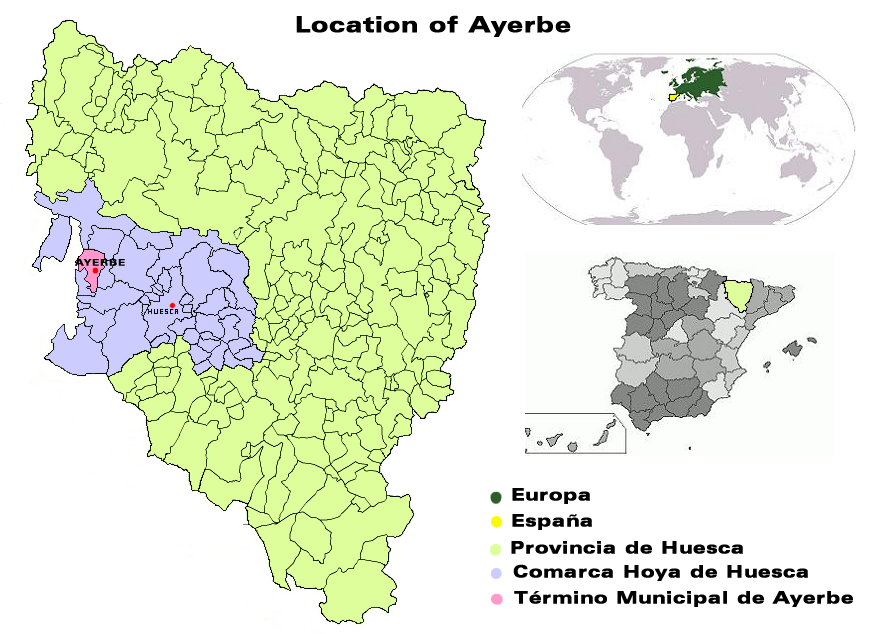
- Location of Ayerbe
- Country: Spain
- Autonomous community: Aragon
- Province: Huesca
- Comarca: Hoya de Huesca

Area
  - Total: 63.29 km^{2} (24.44 sq mi)
- Elevation: 582 m (1,909 ft)

Population (2025-01-01)
  - Total: 1,050
  - Density: 16.6/km^{2} (43.0/sq mi)
- Time zone: UTC+1 (CET)
  - Summer (DST): UTC+2 (CEST)

Ayerbe is also the name of a village in the Broto municipality.

Ayerbe is a town in the Hoya de Huesca comarca, in the autonomous community of Aragon in Spain.

== Geography ==
Ayerbe is located 28 km from Huesca on highway A 132 in the direction of Pamplona, on the Gállego river. It is bounded by Riglos crags and the Santo Domingo range of hills to the north; to the east by the villages of Loarre and Loscorrales; to the south by the villages of Lupiñén-Ortilla, and to the west by the villages of Biscarrues and Murillo de Gállego. It is located at 42°16′36″N 00°41′21″W, with a height above sea level of Alicante of 582 m. and an area of 63.29 square kilometres. It is located in an excavated erosive depression in the surface of the Tertiary period.

The soil is dry, loose and stony, generally level with a sprinkling of small isolated hills. The land is largely covered by pines, olive and almond trees, with vineyards making a comeback. There are also areas of cereal production to the east and south. It is also populated by evergreen oaks, rosemary, gorse and other shrubs in addition to grass. There are occasional occurrences of rabbits, hares and partridges.

The area is particularly attractive to bird watchers, who come to see the lammergeier, griffon vulture and Egyptian vultures, as well as a wide variety of birds of prey. Hunters find plenty of wild boars and deer, as well as partridge and quail.

The hill range behind Ayerbe is part of the Pre-Pyrenees and reaches over 1,600 m, although the town itself is actually on the plain at the foot of the range, which eventually leads down to the River Ebro, around 100 km away.

== Points of interest ==
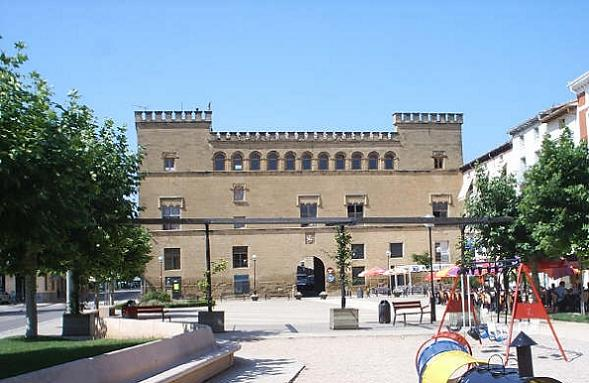
The 16th-century Palacio of the Marquesses de Ayerbe is now a private building, used as a music school.

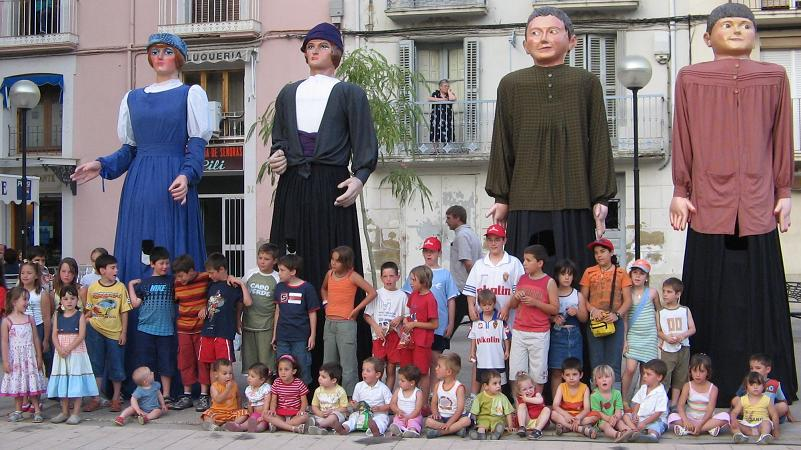
Some of Ayerbe's Giants, which parade every year as part of the Feast of Santa Leticia

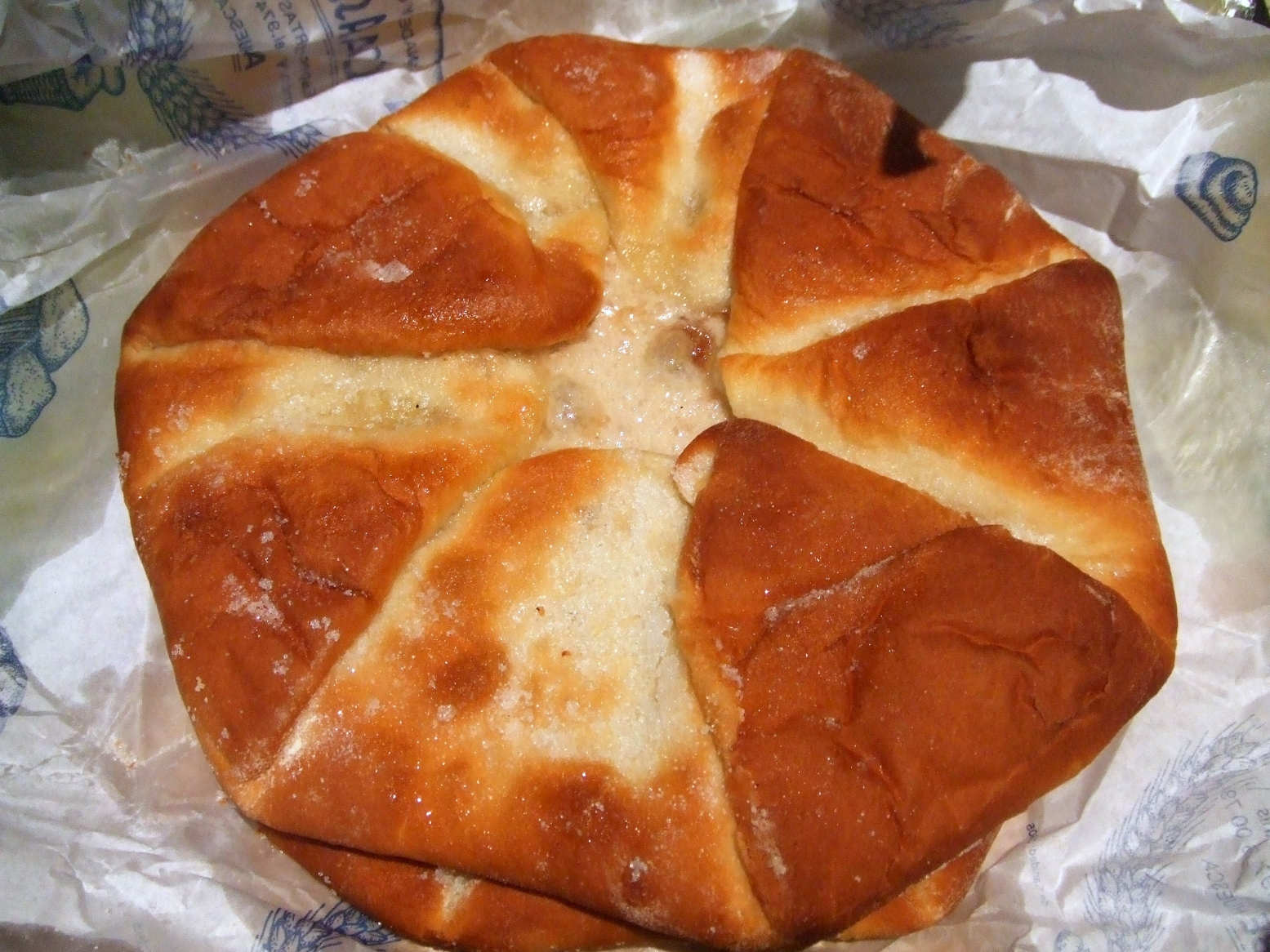
"Refollau" dessert from Ayerbe

The town center features two rectangular squares either side of the 16th-century palace of the Marquesses de Ayerbe or palace of the Marquesses of Urriez (declared a historical monument in 1931), and in general it is the collection of domestic architecture and other architecturally distinguished buildings that make Ayerbe particularly worth visiting.

Ayerbe's main claim to fame is that Santiago Ramón y Cajal, winner of the 1906 Nobel Prize in Physiology or Medicine, lived here for ten years. The town promotes his memory with a museum and visitor centre; Ayerbe library holds a collection of Cajal-related books with more than 250 works and documents for public use.

Ayerbe has a public library, casino, bars, municipal swimming pool and, around the town, a network of footpaths, fields and highways for walkers and cyclists. There are several restaurants, a hotel and bed and breakfast accommodation, as well as tourist information center in the summer months in one of the town squares. Other attractions include Fontaneta park (at 42°16′43″N 00°41′19″W) and the "La Fuente de los Tres Caños" fountain.

The hill directly behind the town is the location of a now renovated chapel at one end and a Moorish castle (in ruins) at the other. These can be reached on foot or by all-terrain vehicle and provide excellent views of the surrounding countryside (even to the Pyrenees).

The town is known by many in the region for its "Tortas de Ayerbe", which are sweet flat, round pastries, usually flavoured with aniseed. Visitors can also purchase locally produced wine, olive oil and honey.

== Fiestas and celebrations ==
The Fiesta of Santa Leticia takes place around September 9 and lasts for four to six days. A sculpture of the Saint is carried in procession, its pedestal garlanded with grapes; figures of giants and "cabezudos" parade in the streets and pyrotechnic figures of bulls race through the town every night.

In 2005 the 6th meeting of the Giants of Aragon took place in the town, bringing together 72 giant figures from all over Aragon: 32 bands, 166 musicians and 140 figure-carriers took part.

"The week of the mushrooms" has been celebrated in the town for years in the month of October and constitutes a social event on an international level.

== See also ==
- (in Spanish) Palace of Ayerbe
- List of municipalities in Huesca
