= Brigades of Navarre =

- Active: December 6, 1936 – November 6, 1937
- Country: Spain
- Allegiance: Nationalists; Carlists
- Branch: Nationalist Army
- Type: Requetés, regular infantry
- Role: Shock troops
- Size: 27,914 (March 1937)
- Engagements: Spanish Civil War; Biscay Campaign; Battle of Bilbao; Cantabrian Campaign; Battle of Santander; Battle of Brunete; Asturias Offensive; Battle of El Mazucu

The Brigades of Navarre (Spanish: Brigadas de Navarra), also known as Navarrese Brigades, were six brigades composed mainly of Navarrese requeté that participated in the Spanish Civil War. They constituted the main nucleus of the Nationalist Army that carried out the Biscay Campaign, including the decisive battle of Bilbao. Once the brigades won the War in the North, they became divisions.

The brigades have been defined as a shock troop equivalent, in terms of value and performance, to the Army of Africa. Each brigade had a strength ranging from 4,000 to 6,000.

== Origins and training ==
After the triumph of the uprising of July 18, 1936 in Navarre, mainly thanks to the Carlist component, the raised requeté regiments (tercio) were made part of the army's structure. While the siege of Madrid was being fought and the northern front was inactive after the Campaign of Gipuzkoa, the nationalist forces were reorganized and trained.

On December 6, 1936, General Emilio Mola ordered that the nationalist Army's 6th Division be divided into two Groups: the first would cover the entire Basque front from Ondarroa to Orduña and the second from this point to the limits of the provinces of León and Palencia. The forces of the 1st Group, under the command of General José Solchaga, would be transformed into the Brigades of Navarre. The requeté regiments of Montejurra, Roncesvalles and Zumalacárregui constituted the 1st Brigade. Altogether, the brigades included 13 requeté regiments and 7 Falange battalions (bandera), in addition to 12 Infantry battalions, of which one was Moroccan. The 5th Tabor of Tetuán was part of the 4th Brigade.

== History of military actions ==
=== Biscay Campaign ===
The operations order for the conquest of Bilbao was prepared in the General Staff of the Navarre Brigades by Lieutenant Colonel Juan Vigón. Biscay and the north represented the majority of Spanish heavy industry and taking it over would close one of the fronts, making it decisive for the Nationalists' victory in the war. In spring 1937, the nationalist army had been increasing its war capabilities. General Mola's plan consisted of cutting the Basque Country in a southeast–northwest line with the four (Note: Subsequently, the number of Navarra Brigades would increase from four to six.) Brigades of Navarre, Italian support troops and an important air force of more than 100 (Note: According to historian Ricardo de la Cierva, the number of nationalist army's planes in the offensive exceeded 200.) Heinkel He 51 and Fiat CR. 32 aircraft that was concentrated in Vitoria. At the very start of the Biscay campaign, the total strength of the Navarrese Brigades amounted to 27,914 men, which, although unequally distributed, was constantly increasing.

Under Solcahaga's orders, the 1st, 4th and a part of the 5th Brigades of Navarre, respectively commanded by Colonels Rafael García Valiño, Camilo Alonso Vega and Rafael Latorre Roca, respectively, began the offensive on March 31, 1937. At the beginning of the offensive, the first four Brigades of Navarre were made up of a total of 27,914 men formed into 32 battalions. In total, the nationalist forces numbered just over 50,000 men. For its part, the republican defense, led by General Francisco Llano de la Encomienda, had 150,000 men between the three provinces of Biscay, Cantabria and Asturias, with a notable mass of artillery (350 muzzles), a tank regiment and abundant ammunition and weapons. The rapport between the infantry forces and the artillery commanded by Colonel Carlos Martínez de Campos, in addition to the air coverage of the German Condor Legion, the Italian Legionary Air Force and the Spanish nationalist Aviación Nacional, would be key to the success of the attackers.

On June 11, 1937, the 1st, 5st and 6th Brigades reached the barbed wire of Bilbao's Iron Ring's trenches under strong air and artillery support. The next day they manage to break the enemy lines with a combination of bombers and batteries. The Condor Legion had dropped 100 tons of bombs that forced the enemy to retreat. The Requeté manage to enter Urrusti, raising the two-color flag of Spain amidst great joy. This action demoralized Bilbao's defenders and allowed the Navarrese to advance uncontrollably, in arrows and zigzags, disconcerting the enemy.

In coordination with Solchaga, General Fidel Dávila Arrondo orders a double envelopment of Bilbao, which forces the Republican General Mariano Gámir Ulíbarri to order the destruction of the bridges over the estuary. José Antonio Aguirre holds a war council with Gamir and the Soviet military advisor Vladimir Gorev and they agree to defend the Biscay's capital all costs. In an attempt to stop the nationalists' advance, on June 12 the government carried out an offensive on the Huesca front, which failed.

On the morning of June 19, 1937, the 1st and 4th Brigades advanced towards the estuary of Bilbao, while the 5th overflowed Mount Artxanda and descended through Begoña and Deusto over the Arenal. General Gamir and his General Staff ordered the withdrawal and the Nationalists took Bilbao, managing to capture 8 Basque nationalist battalions.

Taking Bilbao decisively tipped the balance in the nationalists' favour. It also represented a great moral and propaganda victory for the Requetés, who evoked the memory of General Tomás de Zumalacárregui, who died in the siege of the town a century earlier, during the First Carlist War. On June 20, General Francisco Franco arrived in Bilbao, where he was received by Solchaga.

=== Cantabrian Offensive ===
After the conquest of Biscay, the Navarrese Brigades fought in the Cantabrian Campaign and the Battle of Santander.

From the Santander front, the 4th and 5th Brigades went to the battle of Brunete by order of General José Enrique Varela to try to alleviate the pressure on the Francoist garrison. The arrival of the Navarrese troops forced the Republicans to stop their attack and retreat to their positions on the Guadarrama River.

On September 5, 1937, the 1st Brigade of Navarre would form the advance guard of the Nationalists in the Asturias Offensive, clashing against fierce Republican resistance in the mountain pass of El Mazuco. That day the battle of El Mazucu began. Several units of the 14th Galán Army Corps fought in this sector, among them the veteran Isaac Puente Battalion. After tenacious Republican resistance, the Nationalist forces defeated the Republican defenses after many days of combat and on September 22 the last Republican troops had to retreat, leaving an entry route to Asturias open for the Nationalists. The Navarrese troops took over El Mazucu after thirty-three days of hard fighting.

On October 21, 1937, the 4th Brigade of Navarre took the last Republican bastions of Avilés and Gijón, where they reduced the nests of resistance of the Republican soldiers who could not be evacuated. When the nationalist troops finally took over Gijón, they found a "Dantesque vision" of the port due to the number of sunken or semi-sunken ships there were in it. By October 27, 1937, all of Asturias was in the power of the Nationalist army, thus putting an end to the Northern Campaign that had begun seven months earlier. With the Northern Offensive concluded, Franco orders a reorganization of his forces. The Navarre Brigades would become Divisions that would make up the Navarre Army Corps.

== Commanders ==
Commanders
Unit	Rank	Name
Brigades of Navarre	General	José Solchaga
1st Brigade	Colonel	José Los Arcos Fernández Rafael García Valiño
2nd Brigade	Colonel	Pablo Cayuela Ferreira Agustín Muñoz Grandes
3rd Brigade	Colonel	Rafael Latorre Roca
4th Brigade	Colonel	Camilo Alonso Vega
5th Brigade	Colonel	Juan Bautista Sánchez González
6th Brigade	Colonel	Maximino Bartomeu González-Longoria Miguel Abriat Cantó Helí Rolando de Tella y Cantos

== Bibliography ==
- Álvarez, José; Bowen, Wayne (2007). A Military History of Modern Spain: From the Napoleonic Era to the International War on Terror. Westport, Connecticut: Praeger Security International. ISBN 9781573567237. LCCN 2007028019.
- Aróstegui, Julio (1997). La Guerra Civil, 1936-1939: la ruptura democrática. Historia 16. ISBN 84-7679-320-0.
- Aróstegui, Julio (2013). Combatientes Requetés en la Guerra Civil española, 1936-1939. Madrid: La Esfera de los Libros. ISBN 978-84-9970-997-0.
- Aznar, Manuel (1940). Historia militar de la guerra de España (1936-1939). Vol. I. Ediciones Ideas.
- Blanco Escolá, Carlos (2000). La incompetencia militar de Franco. Alianza Editorial. ISBN 9788420664781.
- Cortabarría Igartua, Germán (2023). "Brigadas de Navarra". Auñamendi Eusko Entziklopedia (in Spanish).
- Nagore, Javier (2002). ¡Gure Banderá, España'ren! (Nuestra Bandera, ¡he aquí España!). Los Tercios de Requetés de Guipúzcoa y Vizcaya en la guerra de 1936-1939. Comunión Tradicionalista Carlista.
- Paniagua, Javier (1991). "5: El levantamiento militar. La guerra. La represión". Historia de España. Vol. XI: Alfonso XIII y la Segunda República (1902-1939). Planeta.
- Payne, Stanley (1996). Identidad y nacionalismo en la España contemporánea: el carlismo, 1833-1975. Actas.
- Solé i Sabaté, Josep María; Villarroya, Joan (2003). España en llamas. La guerra civil desde el aire. Madrid: Temas de Hoy. ISBN 84-8460-302-4.
- Tuñón de Lara, Manuel (1966). La España del siglo XX. Ediciones Akal.
- Tuñón de Lara, Manuel (1985). La Guerra Civil Española 50 años después. Labor.
- Yárnoz, Javier Nagore (2006). "Las Brigadas de Navarra, su espíritu". requetes.com (in Spanish). Archived from the original on 10 May 2006.
- Navarra, Caja (2017). "Brigadas de Navarra". Gran Enciclopedia de Navarra (in Spanish). Archived from the original on 16 June 2017.

=== Books by de la Cierva ===
- de la Cierva, Ricardo (1973). Francisco Franco: un siglo de España. Vol. II. Editora Nacional. ISBN 84-276-1086-6.
- de la Cierva, Ricardo (1981). Historia general de España: guerra civil, por fin historia. Vol. XI. Planeta.
- de la Cierva, Ricardo (1996). Historia esencial de la Guerra Civil Española: todos los problemas resueltos, sesenta años después. Editorial Fénix.
- de la Cierva, Ricardo (2003). Historia actualizada de la Segunda República y la guerra de España, 1931-1939. Editorial Fénix.
- de la Cierva, Ricardo (2004). Hijos de la gloria y la mentira: historia de los vascos entre España y la Antiespaña. Editorial Fénix.
