= Marcelino Bilbao =

Basque military officer (1920–2014)

Marcelino Bilbao Bilbao
- Born: January 14, 1920; Barakaldo, Spain
- Died: 25 January 2014 (aged 94); Châtellerault, France
- Military career
- Allegiance: Basque Country, Second Spanish Republic
- Rank: Lieutenant
- Conflicts: Villarreal Offensive, Biscay Campaign, Battle of Santander, Asturias Offensive, Battle of Teruel, Battle of the Ebro, Aragon Offensive, Catalonia Offensive

Marcelino Bilbao Bilbao (14 January 1920 – 25 January 2014) was a Basque anarchist, Spanish Civil War veteran and Holocaust survivor.

== Biography ==
When he was 16 he joined the Isaac Puente battalion of the Confederación Nacional del Trabajo (CNT), and he participated in the 1937 Battle of Teruel and the 1938 Battle of the Ebro. After the war, he was placed in the Austrian Mauthausen concentration camp and the Ebensee concentration camp run by Nazi Germany. He was subject to human experimentation by SS doctor Aribert Heim. After his liberation by Allied soldiers, he lived the rest of his life in France.

== See also ==
- Anarchism in Spain
