= Villarreal Offensive =

Coordinates: 42°58′N 2°38′W

Villareal Offensive
- Part of the Spanish Civil War
| Date | November 30, 1936 – December 24, 1936 |
| Location | Villareal, near Vitoria, Basque country, Spain |
| Result | Nationalist victory |

Belligerents
| (Spain) Spanish Republic (Basque Country (autonomous community)) Euzko Gudarostea; Isaac Puente Battalion | (Francoist Spain) Nationalist Spain |

Commanders and leaders
| (Spain) Francisco Llano de la Encomienda (Spain) Francisco Ciutat; Alberto de Montaud | (Francoist Spain) Emilio Mola (Francoist Spain) Camilo Alonso Vega |

Strength
| 4,300 men 25 guns 8 armored vehicles | 600 men 5 guns |

Casualties and losses
| 1,000 dead | ? |

The Villarreal Offensive (Spanish: Ofensiva de Villarreal) was an offensive of the Spanish Civil War which lasted from 30 November to 24 December 1936. Eusko Gudarostea's 4,300 men fought 600 men of the insurgent forces.

== Background ==
In 1936, the Basque Aguirre's government organized its own independent army, the Eusko Gudarostea, with 25,000 men. Nominally, the Basque Army was a part of the Republican Army of the North. Furthermore, the war industries were militarized and started the construction of the Bilbao's Iron Belt. In early December the Basques, launched an offensive in order to occupy Vitoria, the capital city of the Alava province, and reduce the Nationalist pressure on Madrid.

== The battle ==
The Republicans, led by the General Francisco Llano de la Encomienda, assembled nineteen infantry battalions, six batteries and some armoured vehicles. The morale of the Basque troops was high, but they had virtually no air support and only a few field guns. Furthermore, before the offensive, one nationalist reconnaissance aircraft from Burgos, spotted the Republican force. Opposing them, the Nationalists had one company of Requetes, two infantry battalions, one machine-gun section and an artillery battery in Villarreal.

The offensive started on 30 November, and the Basques occupied the mountains around Vitoria, surrounded Villarreal (3 km from Vitoria) and their artillery shelled it, but they could not occupy the town. The Nationalist troops repulsed the attacks of the Republican troops and the Basques suffered high losses (1,000 dead). Furthermore, Nationalist reinforcements led by Colonel Camilo Alonso Vega, reached the town. On 13 and 18 December, the Basques launched new attacks against the town, but both of them were beaten off by the Nationalist troops. On 18 December, the Nationalists, started a counter-offensive and ended the siege of the town. By 24 December the battle had ended.

== Aftermath ==
The offensive failed and the Basques did not occupy Villareal, although the Basque forces occupied the mountains of Maroto, Albertia and Jarinto, some miles north of Villareal, until the start of the Biscay Campaign.

== See also ==
- List of Spanish Nationalist military equipment of the Spanish Civil War
- List of Spanish Republican military equipment of the Spanish Civil War
