= Isaac Puente battalion =

National battalion

Isaac Puente Battalion
- Isaac Puente Batailoia
- Active: September 1936 – October 1937
- Country: Spain
- Allegiance: CNT-FAI
- Branch: Confederal militias, Euzko Gudarostea
- Type: Infantry
- Role: Shock troops
- Size: Battalion
- Garrison/HQ: Bilbao
- Patron: Isaac Puente
- Engagements: Spanish Civil War: Villarreal Offensive; Vizcaya Campaign; Battle of Santander; Asturias Campaign; Battle of El Mazuco

Commanders
- Notable commanders: Antonio Teresa de Miguel, Enrique Araujo

The Isaac Puente battalion (Basque: Isaac Puente Batailoia) was a battalion of the Confederación Nacional del Trabajo (CNT) from the Basque Country which was active during the Spanish Civil War from September 1936 to October 1937. It was named after Isaac Puente and was nº 3 of the Milicias Antifascistas de la CNT and nº 11 of the Euzko Gudarostea. The battalion participated in the Villarreal Offensive, the Vizcaya Campaign, the Battle of Santander, the Asturias Campaign and the Battle of El Mazuco.

== Origins ==
The battalion was named in memory of Isaac Puente, an anarchist theorist who had been shot by the nationalists on 1 September 1936. The Isaac Puente Battalion was formed in September 1936, in the barracks of the Casilla de Bilbao. On 25 September, in this same barracks, the battalion withstood their first aerial bombardment by nationalist forces.

== History ==
=== Villarreal offense ===
The battalion first saw combat during the Villarreal Offensive in the Chavalopea del Monte pine forest, in the first days of November 1936. Although it defended its position and its commander was congratulated by the General Staff, the subsequent defeat was terrible and the battalion suffered more than 200 casualties, including about 100 dead.

=== In the siege of Oviedo ===
On 13 February, the battalion left Basauri to fight in Asturias, within the 1st Basque Expeditionary Brigade. Between February and March, it participated in the Siege of Oviedo, in the San Claudio sector. The battalion achieved its objective but had to fall back before the failure of other republican units. The battalion then returned from Asturias to stop the enemy offensive, acting from the top of Barazar.

=== Vizcaya Campaign ===
In March 1937 there were various disagreements between the Basque Government and the CNT, and the Isaac Puente Battalion had a strong confrontation with two PNV battalions that came out in Galdakao, but finally everything was solved without armed confrontation. The Biscay Campaign began at the end of March, the battalion fought in the Barazar port area. At the end of April it helped in the definitive withdrawal from the Gipuzkoan fronts, and at the beginning of May the battalion returned to the area of mount Sollube, on the coast of Vizcaya. In May 1937, the battalion fought in the Bizkargi mountains alongside Asturian troops.

=== The withdrawal to Cantabria and Asturias ===
After the fall of Bizkaia into Francoist hands, the "Isaac Puente" battalion marched towards Cantabria. After the Pact of Santoña and the surrender of the PNV, the "Isaac Puente" battalion continued fighting, becoming the 1st Battalion of the 156th Mixed Brigade (former 3rd Basque Brigade) within the 1st Basque Division. After visiting Solares and Torrelavega, the battalion withdrew to Asturias, where it fought in September and October, standing out in the Battle of El Mazuco.

In this battle, the battalion was decorated with the Medal of Freedom (highest distinction of the Second Spanish Republic) awarded by Belarmino Tomás, president of the Sovereign Council of Asturias and León, to the commander of the battalion, Antonio Teresa de Miguel. After fighting until the end in Asturias and before the imminent final collapse of the Northern Front, part of its men evacuated by sea, managing to escape the siege and reach the coast of France to fight again in Catalunya in different units.

== Tributes ==
In July 2006 several members of the battalion participated in a tribute to the Euzko Gudarostea, including Félix Padín Gallo, Marcelino Bilbao and Francisco Alonso Uriarte.

== See also ==
- Anarchism in Spain
