= Caldueñu =

- Parish
- Interactive map of Caldueñu
- Country: Spain
- Autonomous community: Asturias
- Province: Asturias
- Municipality: Llanes

Caldueñu (Spanish: Caldueño) is one of 28 parishes (administrative divisions) in the municipality of Llanes in eastern Asturias, in northern Spain. It is just south of the Mazucu mountain and the village of El Mazuco (where the Battle of El Mazuco occurred in 1937 during the Spanish Civil War).

== Villages ==
- Buda - Las Jareras
- Caldueñin (43°22′47″N 4°52′00″W)
- Cortines
- Debodes
- El Mazuco
- Villa
