= Mere =

Mere may refer to:

== Places ==
- Mere, Belgium, a village in East Flanders
- Mere, Cheshire, England
- Mere, Wiltshire, England
- Meré, a village in Spain

== People ==
- Mere (name)

== Other uses ==
- Mere (lake), a type of body of water, often broad in relation to its depth
- Mere (weapon), a Māori war club
- Mere (album), an album by Norwegian rock band deLillos
- Mère, honorary title given to female French cooks
- MERE, a brand of Russian discount supermarket chain Svetofor

== See also ==
- Mere Brow, Lancashire, England
- Mere Green (disambiguation), two places in England
- Méré (disambiguation)
- Meres (disambiguation)
