= José García Vayas =

- Born: 7 September 1889; Estella, Navarre
- Died: France
- Occupation: Soldier
- Known for: Command in Santander 1936–37

José García Vayas (7 September 1889 – 1962) was a Spanish soldier who remained loyal to the Second Spanish Republic during the Spanish Civil War (1936–39), during which he commanded the forces in Santander. After the civil war he was forced into exile in France.

== Early years ==
José García Vayas was born in Estella, Navarre, on 7 September 1889, son of captain José García Pradas. He was admitted to the Infantry Academy on 29 August 1909, and graduated on 27 February 1912 as a second lieutenant. He was assigned to the Valencia infantry regiment of Santander. On 6 September 1918 he was promoted to the rank of captain. On 7 September 1925 he volunteered with his battalion to serve in Morocco, returning to Santander in October 1926. He was known for his left-wing views, which were unpopular during the dictatorship of Miguel Primo de Rivera. On 7 June 1934 García Vayas was promoted to infantry commander. In April 1936 he was given the command of the Second Battalion of the Santander Infantry Regiment, stationed in Santoña.

== Civil war ==
Insurgent advances in the north March–October 1937, taking first the Basque Country, then Santander and finally Asturias

García Vayas refused to join the military rebellion in July 1936, and helped the socialist leader Juan Ruiz Olazarán to prevent the supporters of General Francisco Franco taking control in Santander. After the attempted coup in Santander failed he was named military commander of the Province of Santander (now called Cantabria) and president of the Council of War. He replaced Colonel Pérez y García Argūelle as head of the Valencia Regiment.

When the Army of the North was formed, García Vayas was promoted to lieutenant colonel and named head of the 14th Army Corps. Captain Francisco Ciutat de Miguel was given command of the Army of the North. This covered Asturias, Santander and the Basque Country. These regions maintained considerable political and military autonomy. In the mining region of Asturias the militias were led by Belarmino Tomás, head of the Popular Front committee for that region. García Vayas led the armed forces in Santander. The Basque militias were militarized on 26 October 1936 by José Antonio Aguirre, president of the Basque Country.

On 15 November 1936 General Francisco Llano de la Encomienda replaced Ciutat de Miguel. He completely failed to form a unified command. The Francoist General Emilio Mola began a campaign in the north on 31 March 1937. His first goal was to capture the industrial areas of the Basque Country. The campaign was ruthless, using massive artillery strikes and bombing of cities such as Guernica to crush resistance. On 27 May 1937 Llano de la Encomienda was officially replaced by General Mariano Gámir Ulíbarri. In June 1937 García Vayas was promoted to colonel. Nationalist, German and Italian planes delivered heavy bombing behind the front lines in August 1937. After the Battle of Santander that month, the province fell on 1 September 1937.

After the fall of the north García Vayas was named commander of the Demarcación de Toledo, and then put in charge of the centers of recruitment, training and mobilization (CRIM). At the end of the war he went into exile in France, where he died in 1962.

== Sources ==
- Alpert, Michael (2013-02-28). The Republican Army in the Spanish Civil War, 1936–1939. Cambridge University Press. ISBN 978-1-107-32857-0.
- Carruthers, Bob (2013-05-17). Panzers I & II: Germany's Light Tanks. Pen and Sword. ISBN 978-1-4738-4531-2.
- González Morales, Manuel R.; Solórzano Telechea, Jesús Ángel; Arias Cabal, Pablo (2005-01-01). II Encuentro de Historia de Cantabria: actas del II encuentro celebrado en Santander los días 25 a 29 de noviembre del año 2002 (in Spanish). Ed. Universidad de Cantabria. ISBN 978-84-8102-954-3.
- Graham, Helen (2002-12-19). The Spanish Republic at War 1936-1939. Cambridge University Press. p. 247. ISBN 978-0-521-45932-7.
- Gutiérrez Flores, Jesús; Gudín de la Lama, Enrique (2005). "Cuatro derroteros militares de la guerra civil en Cantabria". Monte Buciero (in Spanish) (11). ISSN 1138-9680.
- Salvadó, Francisco J. Romero (2013-03-14). Historical Dictionary of the Spanish Civil War. Scarecrow Press. ISBN 978-0-8108-8009-2.
- Solla Gutiérrez, Miguel Ángel (2010-10-18). La República sitiada: Trece meses de Guerra Civil en Cantabria (in Spanish). Ed. Universidad de Cantabria. ISBN 978-84-8102-578-1.
