= Méré =

Méré may refer to:

- Méré, Yvelines, France
- Méré, Yonne, France
- Antoine Gombaud, Chevalier de Méré (1607 – 1684), French writer.

== See also ==
- Meré, Spain
- Mere (disambiguation)
