= Euzko Gudarostea =

Military of the Basque Government during the Spanish Civil War (1936-39)

Basque Army
- Euzko Gudarostea
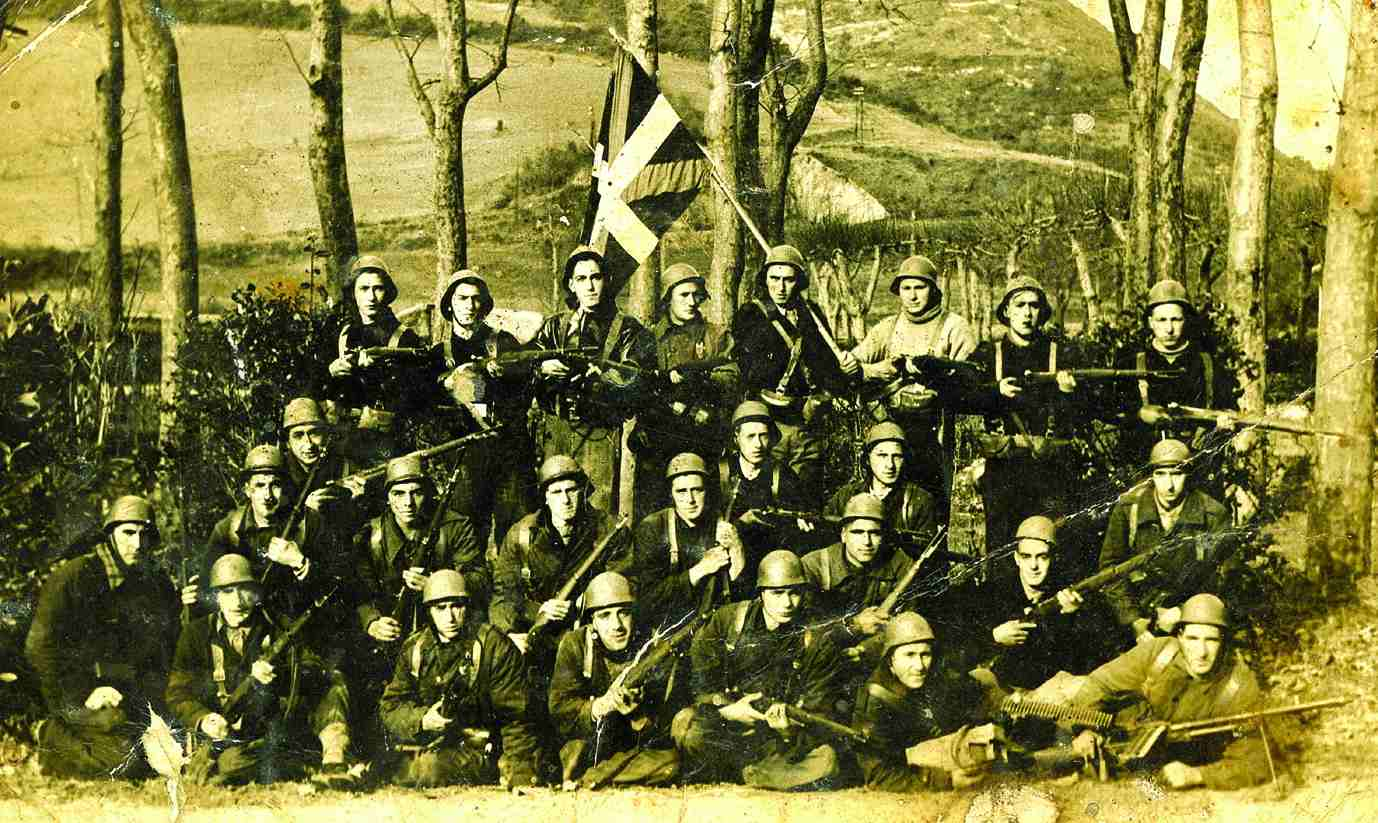
- Amaiur Battalion of the Euzko Gudarostea during the Spanish Civil War. Biscay, 1937.
- Active: 17 July 1936 – 26 August 1937
- Country: Spain
- Allegiance: Basque Government
- Type: Infantry
- Size: Corps
- Garrison/HQ: Bilbao
- Engagements: Spanish Civil War: Villarreal Offensive, Biscay Campaign

Commanders
- Chief of Staff: Alberto de Montaud Noguerol
- Political commissar: Justo Somonte Iturrioz
- Notable commanders: Kandido Saseta †; Jose Antonio Agirre

Euzko Gudarostea (spelled in modern Basque: Eusko Gudarostea, lit. 'Basque army') was the name of the army commanded by the Basque Government during the Spanish Civil War. It was formed by Basque nationalists, socialists, communists, anarchists and republicans under the direction of lehendakari José Antonio Aguirre and coordinating with the army of the Second Spanish Republic. It fought the forces of Francisco Franco during 1936 and 1937. It surrendered to the Italian Corpo Truppe Volontarie at Santoña (province of Cantabria), while the rest of the Republican army kept fighting until 1939. This event is called the Santoña Agreement, Pact of Santoña, or Treason of Santoña by some Spanish leftists.

== Gudari ==
The Basque word for a soldier, gudari (plural gudariak), is a neologism (from guda, "war", thus meaning "warrior" literally). The Standard Basque word is the Romance-derived soldadu. Like other Basque nationalist neologisms (ikurriña, lendakari), the meaning of gudari has been restricted to Basque concepts. The Basque word for an army is the Romance-derived armada.

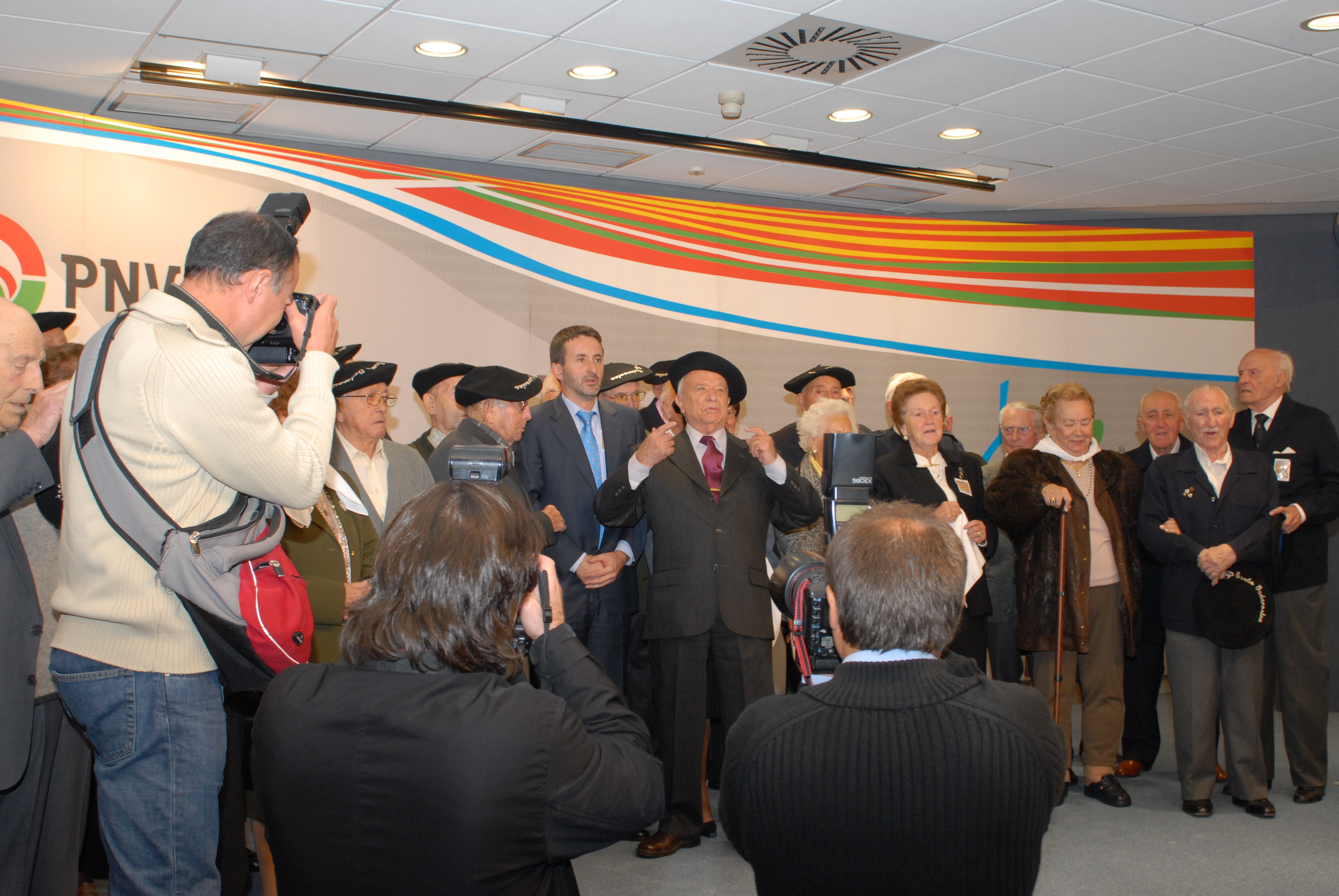
PNV members celebrate the Gudari Eguna.

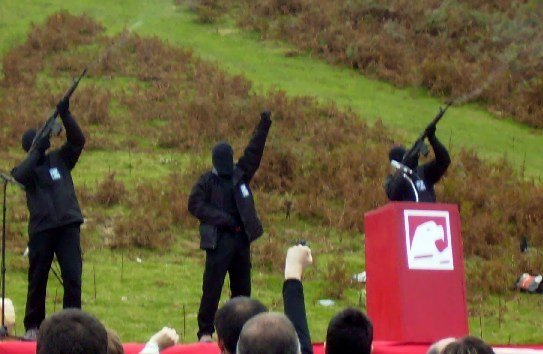
Members of ETA shoot salvoes in the Gudari Eguna.

The members of the Basque militant ETA consider themselves gudariak continuing the struggle of the Civil War Basque soldiers. This is contested by those war veterans that support the Basque Nationalist Party (PNV), Spanish Socialist Workers' Party or Communist Party.

The Gudari Eguna ("warrior day") is thus celebrated separately:

- by ETA supporters on 27 September, remembering the date (1975) of the execution of Jon Paredes (a.k.a. Txiki) in Cerdanyola del Vallès, Barcelona, and Ángel Otaegui in Burgos.
- by PNV supporters on 9 November since 1937.

== See also ==
- Basque Auxiliary Navy
- Ertzaintza, the wartime police under the Basque government.
- Eusko Gudariak, the anthem of the Basque soldiers.
- Lepoan hartu, a song by Telesforo de Monzón about taking the corpse of a fellow soldier and going on.
