= Asturias Offensive =

1937 military offensive

- Part of the Spanish Civil War
| Date | 1 September – 21 October 1937 |
| Location | Asturias, Spain |
| Result | Nationalist victory |
| Territorial changes | Asturias captured by Nationalist forces. |

Belligerents
| Spanish Republic; Asturias; Isaac Puente Battalion | Nationalist Spain; Italy (CTV) (Nazi Germany) Condor Legion |

Commanders and leaders
| (Second Spanish Republic) Adolfo Prada (Second Spanish Republic) Francisco Ciutat (Second Spanish Republic) Francisco Galán; Belarmino Tomás | (Francoist Spain) Fidel Dávila (Francoist Spain) Antonio Aranda (Francoist Spain) José Solchaga (Francoist Spain) Agustín Muñoz Grandes |

Strength
| 45,000; 180 artillery guns 1 destroyer 1 submarine | 90,000; 250 artillery guns 250 aircraft 2 cruisers 1 destroyer |

The Asturias Offensive (Spanish: Ofensiva de Asturias, Asturian: Ofensiva d'Asturies) was an offensive in Asturias during the Spanish Civil War from 1 September to 21 October 1937.

The Nationalists launched an offensive against the Republicans in eastern Asturias which had recently become an enclave. The Nationalist force of 90,000 men, with support from the Condor Legion and the Corps of Volunteer Troops, attacked the Republican force of 45,000 men composed of Spanish Republican Army soldiers and allied Confederal militias from two directions. The Republicans resisted the much larger Nationalist force until mid-September when their lines were broken and began to lose territory to further offensives. The Nationalist capture of Gijón in late October saw the end of Republican occupation in northern Spain and the end of the War in the North.

== Background ==
In late August 1937, the Republicans captured the town of Belchite at the Battle of Belchite, but their offensive failed to capture Zaragoza. The Nationalists decided to redeploy their forces and continued their offensive against Asturias, the last piece of Republican-held territory in northern Spain. The Nationalists already controlled parts of western Asturias including Oviedo, and recent victories at the Battle of Bilbao and the Battle of Santander had turned eastern Asturias into a Republican enclave. On 29 August, the Sovereign Council of Asturias, led by Belarmino Tomas, assumed all military and civil powers and appointed Colonel Adolfo Prada as commander of the Spanish Republican Army of the North.

=== Opposing forces ===
The Nationalist offensive was launched by General Fidel Dávila Arrondo's Army of the North with 80,000 men, which included José Solchaga's four Brigades of Navarre, Antonio Aranda's three divisions, and the Italian Corps of Volunteer Troops (CTV). The Nationalists also had 250 cannons and 250 aircraft.

The Republicans had the Army of the North led by Prada, with the XIV Army Corps led by Francisco Galán (8,000–10,000 men) and Colonel Linares's XVII Army corps (35,000). Prada's chief of staff was Francisco Ciutat. The Republicans had 180 cannons, one squadron of Chatos and two flights of Moscas, around 35 aircraft.

== Offensive ==
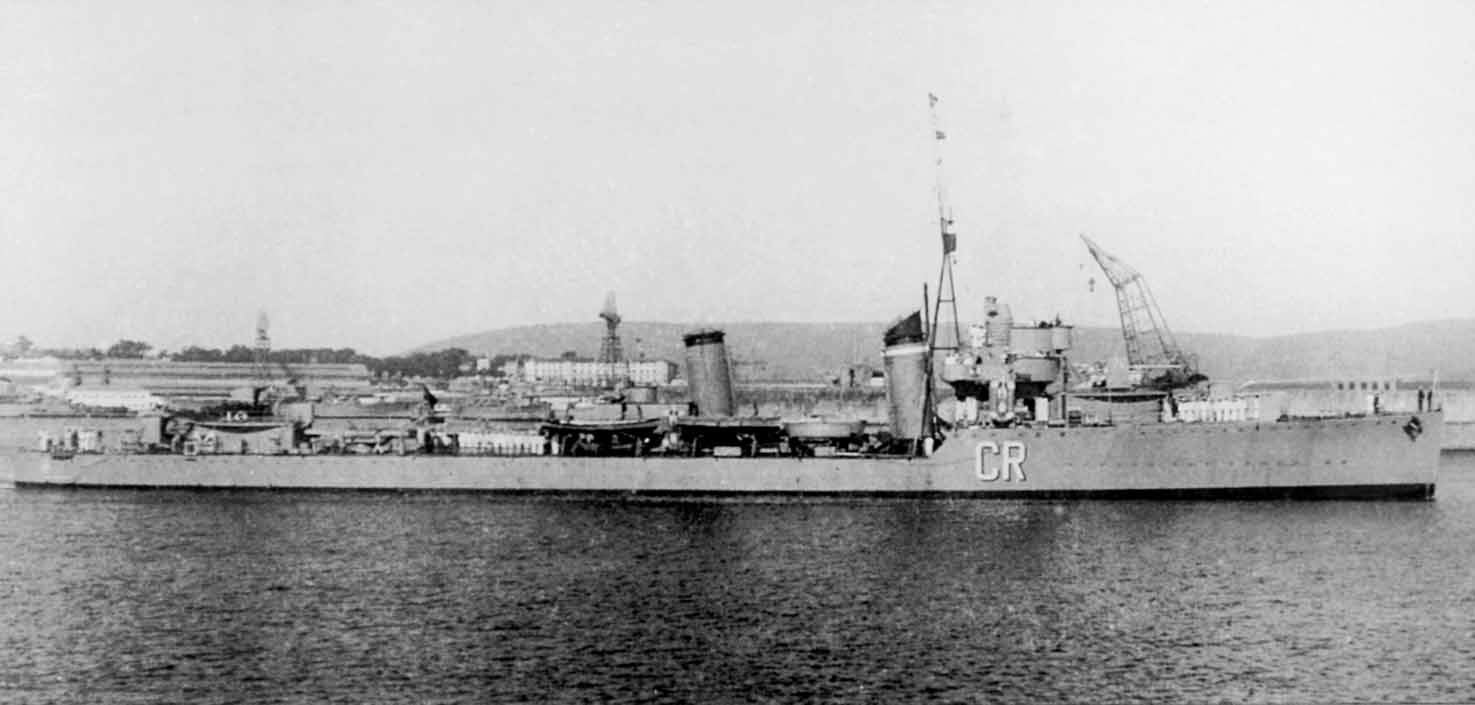
The destroyer Císcar, sank at Gijón's harbour on 20 October.

On 1 September, the Nationalist offensive started with Solchaga advancing from the east and Aranda from the southwest, but despite their crushing numerical and air superiority their advance was painfully slow, achieving less than 1 kilometre a day. The Republicans fought fiercely, and the difficult terrain of the Cordillera Cantabrica provided excellent defensive positions. Solchaga's troops (33,000 men) occupied Llanes on 5 September and in the Battle of El Mazuco attacked the heights, held by a militia of workers from the Republican-aligned National Confederation of Labor (CNT) from La Felguera (5,000 men). The Navarrese eventually took the valley and surrounding mountains, but only after 33 days of bloody combat. On 18 September, the Nationalists occupied Ribadesella, and on 1 October Covadonga, but by 14 October the Republicans still held several high passes of the Leonese Mountains.

The main goal of the Republicans was to delay the Nationalist advance until winter came. Nevertheless, the German Legion Condor returned from the Aragon front and started to bomb the Republican positions. The German squadrons used cans of petrol attached to incendiary bombs and tested the idea of carpet bombing. On 14 October, Arriondas fell and Colonel Agustín Muñoz Grandes managed to break the Republican front, entering Tama and advancing to Campo de Caso. The Republican troops retreated to Gijón, and on 15 October Solchaga's troops joined up with Aranda's troops.

The Republican government then ordered a general evacuation of Asturias. On 17 October, the Sovereign Council of Asturias decided to start the evacuation, but the Legion Condor sank the Republican destroyer Ciscar, and the Nationalist fleet blocked the Asturian harbours. Only the senior officers managed to escape on gunboats and fishing vessels (Prada, Galán, Segundo Blanco, Belarmino Tomas). On 20 October, twenty-two Republican battalions surrendered, and Colonel José Franco handed over the town of Trubia to the Nationalists. On 21 October, the Nationalists entered Gijón, ending the occupation of Asturias. Nevertheless, thousands of Republican soldiers fled to the nearby mountains and started a guerrilla campaign against the Nationalist troops.

== Aftermath ==
The Asturias Offensive marked the end of a Republican presence in northern Spain and Nationalist victory in the War in the North. Asturias was a Republican stronghold so the Nationalist reprisals were harsh: in Oviedo alone, 1,000 Republican prisoners were executed. Many prisoners were sent to labour battalions or were forced to join the Nationalist army (around 100,000). Furthermore, with the conquest of the north, the Nationalists now controlled 36 per cent of Spanish industry, including 60 percent of coal production and all of the steel production.

== See also ==
- List of Spanish Nationalist military equipment of the Spanish Civil War
- List of weapons of the Corpo Truppe Volontarie
- Condor Legion
- List of Spanish Republican military equipment of the Spanish Civil War

== Bibliography ==
- Beevor, Antony (2006). The Battle for Spain The Spanish Civil War, 1936-1939. Penguin. ISBN 978-0-14-303765-1.
- Thomas, Hugh (2003). The Spanish Civil War. Penguin Books, Limited (UK). ISBN 978-0-14-101161-5.
