= Battle of El Mazucu =

1937 Militar offense during Spanish Civil War

- Part of the Asturias Offensive of the War in the North campaign of the Spanish Civil War
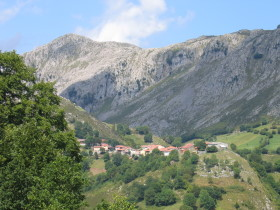
- El Mazucu and the heights of Llabres
| Date | 6–22 September 1937 |
| Location | El Mazucu 43°22′56″N 4°51′09″W, near Llanes, Asturias, Spain |
| Result | Nationalist victory |

Belligerents
| (Spain) Spanish Republic; Sovereign Council of Asturias and León; Confederal militias | (Francoist Spain) Spanish State |

Commanders and leaders
| Lt. Col. Francisco Galán Rodríguez; Cpt. Juan Ibarrola Orueta | Col. José Solchaga Zala |

Strength
| Less than 5,000 | 33,000, plus elements of the Legión Cóndor and (possibly) Corpo Truppe Volontarie |

Casualties and losses
| Unknown | Unknown |

The Battle of El Mazucu was fought between 6 and 22 September 1937, between the Republican and Nationalist armies during the Spanish Civil War as a part of the War in the North campaign. The Republican defence of El Mazucu and the surrounding mountains halted the Nationalist advance into eastern Asturias, despite their forces being outnumbered sevenfold. After weeks of intense fighting over extreme terrain the defenders were eventually overwhelmed, and the Nationalists were then able to link up with their forces advancing from León, leading to the fall of Gijón and the abandonment of Asturias, the last Republican province in North-West Spain.

This battle was almost certainly the first use of carpet bombing against a military target.

== Prelude ==
Following the fall of Bilbao and the defeat of the Republican forces defending Santander, the Republican stronghold of Asturias was isolated from the Republican armies in the south and east of Spain. The leader of the Nationalist forces surrounding Asturias, General Fidel Dávila, attacked from the south and from the east, expecting little resistance from the demoralized Republicans.

The first republican line, along the Deva River, was soon overrun, and the town of Llanes fell on 5 September 1937. However, the routes the Nationalists then had to take were commanded by the limestone walls of the Sierra de Cuera on the north of the front and the Deva Gorge to the south. The Nationalists had to clear the defenders from these mountains in order to advance, and to do that they planned a pincer movement moving southwest from Llanes and west, along Cares river, from Panes towards Cabrales.

On both fronts, the rugged terrain and stiff Republican resistance halted the advance. It was then clear that the mountains of the Sierra de Cuera were vital to the defence of Asturias, and the key to the Sierra de Cuera was the pass of El Mazucu.

== The combatants ==
The Nationalist forces comprised four Brigades of Navarre (33,000 men), under the command of General José Solchaga Zala (Solchaga) in Llanes, with 15 artillery batteries and strong air support (including the German Condor Legion, partly based on the Cue Aerodrome). The pass of El Mazucu is only five km from the sea, and so the cruiser Almirante Cervera was also able to use its 6 in. guns in the action.

The Asturian and some Basque and Santander forces (Republicans) comprised three weakened brigades (fewer than 5,000 men in all), under the command of Colonels Juan Ibarrola Orueta and Francisco Galán Rodríguez (Ibarrola and Galán) in Meré, with little artillery and no air support.

== The battle ==
El Mazucu from Alto de la Tornería, with the ridge of Llabres on the right

The attack on El Mazucu began with an assault by the Nationalist Navarrese I brigade on 6 September. This was repulsed, and at the same time the southern advance of the pincer movement was also stopped. In response to these setbacks, the German Condor Legion was called in and for the first time carpet-bombed a military target, the Republican forces defending the approach to El Mazucu.

On 7 September further attacks were halted and the fronts stabilized; a noted Republican commander, Higinio Carrocera, arrived, with three battalions and 24 heavy machine guns. Carpet-bombing with explosive and incendiary bombs continued all day.

The next day in dense fog, fierce hand-to-hand fighting inflicted severe losses on both sides. The Nationalists gained some 2 km on the southern front, which the Republicans were unable to recapture.

The Nationalists used the following day to shell the positions defending El Mazucu, and two Republican battalions were forced to retreat, although the Nationalists were unable to take advantage of the withdrawal. For the rest of that day and the next, waves of bombings and artillery bombardment were each followed by a Nationalist infantry attack, each in turn cut down and turned back by the Republican machine-guns.

The fog having returned on 10 September, an all-out attack by the I Brigade took the hill of Biforco (below the pass of El Mazucu), but this was still dominated by the heights of Llabres, from where the Republicans hammered the area with machine guns and rolled down carbide drums filled with explosive. For the first time since the start of the battle, hot food reached the Republican front lines.

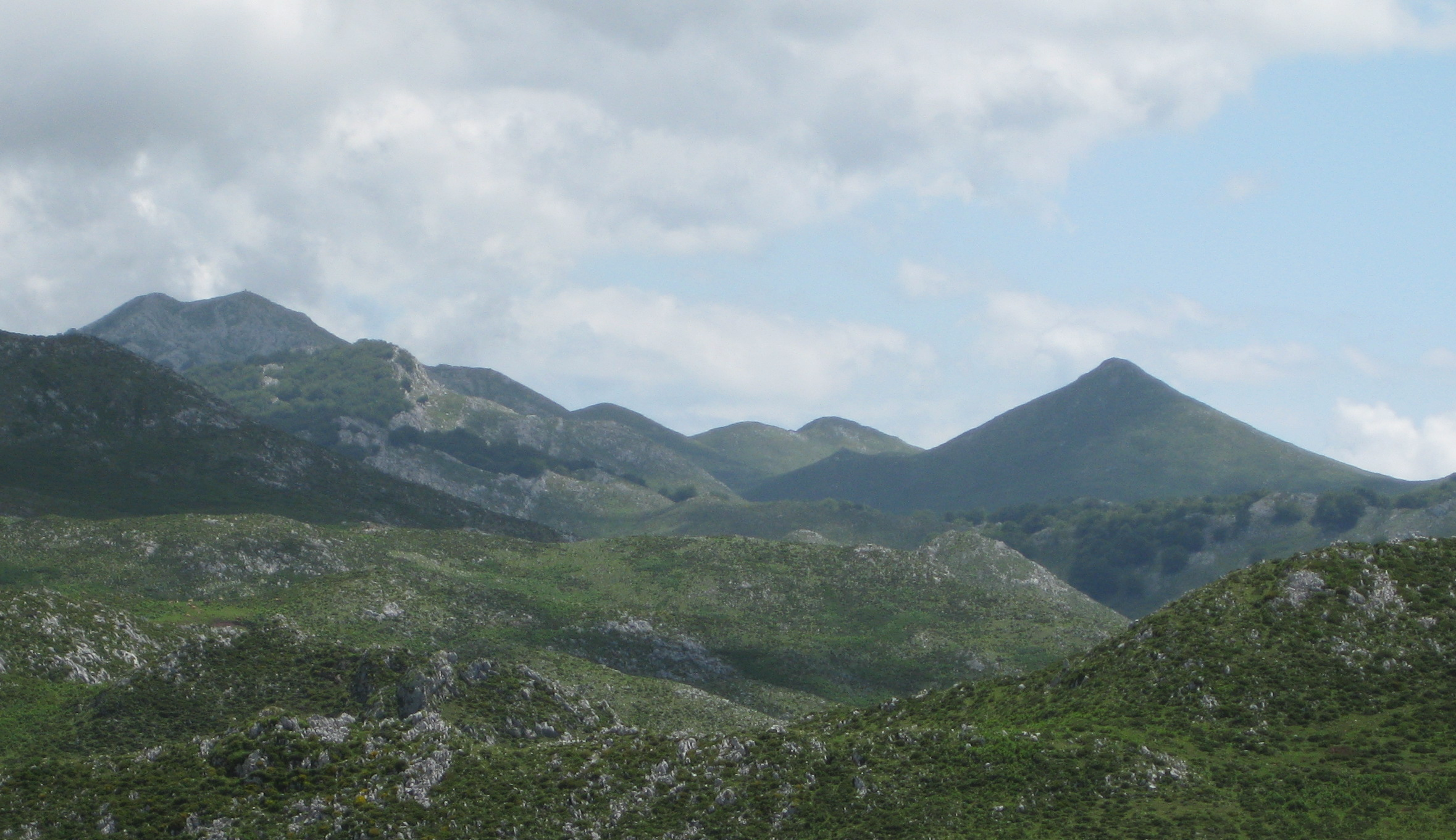
Peña Turbina (at left)

During the next two days, on the southern front, the Nationalists could not make progress along the valley, so had no option but to advance up the ridge of the Sierra towards Pico Turbina. This peak, at 1,315m, is a formidable obstacle with slopes of 40° and an almost moon-like karst terrain. There were no tracks, even for mules, so supplies and ordnance were largely carried by hand. The weather was bad, too, so aircraft could not operate – but the fog also hid the attacking forces.

By 13 September the Republican front to the north-west of El Mazucu began to weaken under the relentless artillery bombardment, and the Republicans were forced to yield Sierra Llabres, whose height commands both the village of El Mazucu and the western approaches on 14 September. The village of El Mazucu itself was then indefensible. To the south, Pico Turbina was almost taken, but the attack was driven back with hand-grenades, in confused fighting in dense fog.

El Mazucu and its surrounds were occupied on 15 September, and the Republicans in that sector fell back to Meré. To the south, the Republicans still held the heights of Pico Turbina and Peñas Blancas (the summits of Peña Blanca). Pico Turbina was taken, and Peña Blanca was almost encircled as Arangas and Arenas fell to the Nationalists the next day.

The three summits of Peñas Blancas now formed the only salient from the Republican line along the Bedón river. Initial Nationalist assaults failed, and so sixteen battalions were brought up to reduce the positions. Air support was minimal due to the weather, and on the ground, rain turned to snow on the heights.

The better weather on 18 September at noon brought three waves of airborne strafing from 'strings' of Junkers and Fiat fighters, and possibly Heinkel 51s based on the Cue Aerodrome. After each attack, the inevitable infantry assault was beaten off by machine guns and hand grenades. For four full days, the pattern was repeated: aircraft and mortars pounded the remaining defenders, the Navarrese infantry attacked, and were repulsed. Until 22 September "the red flag waved on the highest peak". On that day, the Peñas Blancas were finally overrun.

== Aftermath ==
The defence of El Mazucu offered the hope of stemming the Nationalist advance until winter; if that had been achieved, then the course of the war would have been different. As it was, the attackers suffered a costly delay. The defenders regained their honour, battered in Santander, but also at great cost. The third parties involved, notably the Condor Legion, learned many lessons which were later applied in the European theatre of the World War that followed.

The defence of El Mazucu also allowed the Republicans further west in Asturias a certain breathing space and a chance to regroup, but ultimately this made little difference. The Nationalists on the Eastern front soon joined up with the forces advancing from León at Infiesto, and closed in on Gijón. Gijón, the last republican stronghold in Northern Spain, fell on 21 October.

== See also ==
- List of Spanish Nationalist military equipment of the Spanish Civil War
- List of weapons of the Corpo Truppe Volontarie
- Condor Legion
- List of Spanish Republican military equipment of the Spanish Civil War
