= Meres =

Meres may refer to:

- Mere (lake), a type of body of water, often one that is broad in relation to its depth.
- Mere (weapon), a Māori war club
- Meres, Iran, a village in Mazandaran Province, Iran
- Meres, Asturias, a village in Siero Municipality, Asturias, Spain
- Meres Valley, Meres Cliff and Meres Ledges, locales in Mullion, Cornwall, UK
- Mères of France, talented female cooks in the 18th, 19th, and 20th centuries
- Francis Meres (1565–1647), English churchman and author

== See also ==
- Mere (disambiguation)
