= Mere (name) =

Mere is both a surname and a given name. In the Māori language, it is a transliteration of the name Mary. Notable people with the name include:

== Given name ==
- Mere Berryman, New Zealand academic
- Mere Boynton (born 1966), New Zealand singer, producer, and actor
- Mere Broughton (1938–2016), New Zealand Māori language activist and unionist
- Mere Haana Hall (c.1881 – 23 August 1966), New Zealand teacher and principal
- Mere Harper (1842–1934), New Zealand porter, cultural informant, and midwife
- Mere Hüseyin Pasha (died 1624), Ottoman statesman
- Mere Kingi (born 1974), New Zealand rugby union player
- Mere Lodge (born 1944), New Zealand Māori artist and advocate for te reo Māori
- Mere Rikiriki (1855–1926), New Zealand prophet
- Mere Roberts, New Zealand researcher and biologist
- Mere Smith, American television script-writer and story editor
- Mere Tuiasosopo Betham (1932–1997), American Samoan educator, civil servant and government minister

== Surname ==
- Ain-Ervin Mere (1903–1969), Estonian war criminal
- Frédéric Dupetit-Méré (1785–1827), French playwright and dramatist
- Gories Mere (born 1954), Indonesian businessman
- John Mere (died 1558), second recorded Registry of the University of Cambridge
- Jorge Meré (born 1997), Spanish footballer
- Richard atte Mere (fl.1386–1397), English Member of Parliament
- Vuyo Mere (born 1984), South African footballer

== Nickname ==
- Mere (footballer) (born 1975), Spanish footballer

== See also ==
- Mere (disambiguation)
