= Meré =

- Parish
- Interactive map of Meré
- Country: Spain
- Autonomous community: Asturias
- Province: Asturias
- Municipality: Llanes

Meré is a village (and also a parroquia) in the concejo of Llanes, in Asturias. Its population in 2004 was 175, in 84 dwellings.

It is located on the banks of the Ríu de las Cabras at 43°22′31″N 4°54′52″W, which is 28 km from Llanes and about midway between Posada and Benia. It can also be reached from Llanes by taking the road that passes El Mazuco.

During and after the Battle of El Mazuco in 1937 it was the headquarters of the Republican forces; see El Mazuco (La defensa imposible). Almost the entire village was burned to the ground during the war, and had to be rebuilt. However, the Palacio de Meré survived; it was built in the 18th century alongside a smaller and older building.

Meré's main Fiesta is on 31 October; Nuestra Señora del Rosario.

== Villages ==
- Meré
- L'Agüera
- El Cuetu
- Elcéu

== See also ==
- Méré (disambiguation)
- Mere (disambiguation), a lake, or a place in England.
