= Sollube =

Mountain in the Basque Country of Spain

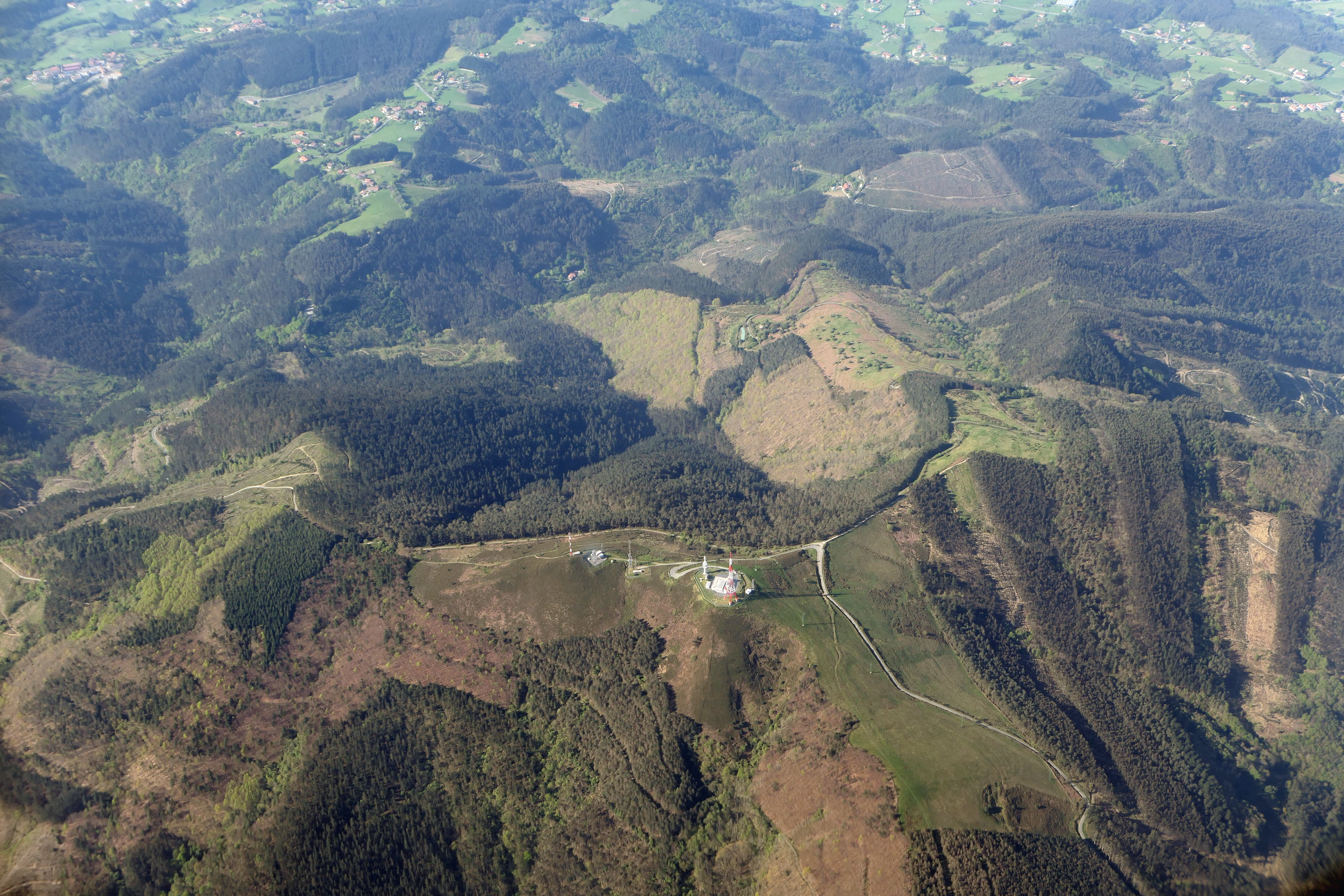
- Aerial view of Sollube

Highest point
- Elevation: 703 m (2,306 ft)
- Prominence: 524 m (1,719 ft)
- Coordinates: 43.371944°N 2.7625°W

Geography
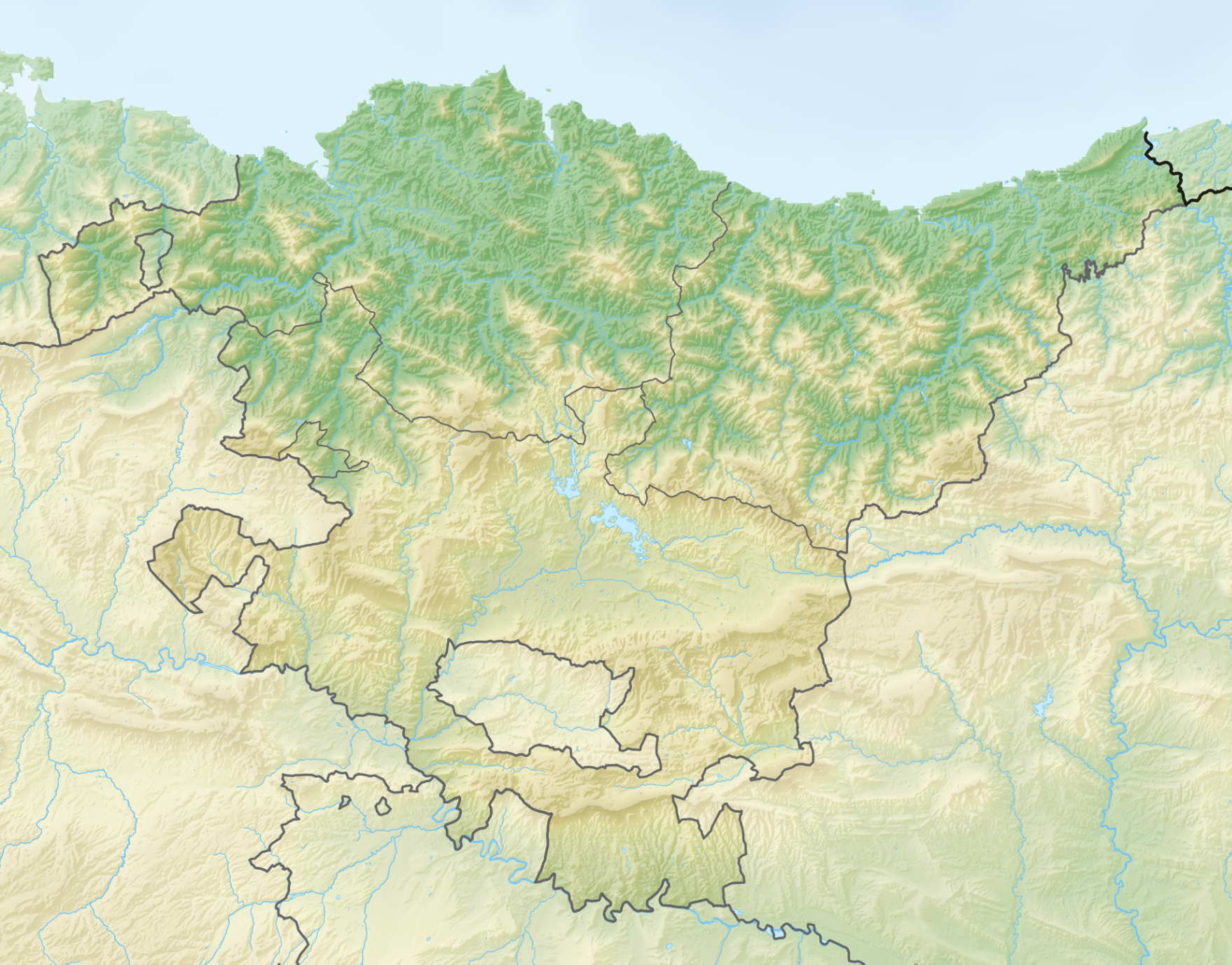
- Location within the Basque Country
- Location: Bermeo, Biscay, Basque Autonomous Community, Spain
- Parent range: Basque Mountains

Sollube is a mountain located in Bermeo, Biscay, in the Basque Country of Spain. It is situated on the left bank of the Urdaibai estuary, and constitutes one of the limits of the reserve. It extends across the municipalities of Bermeo, Meñaka, Arrieta and Busturia. The summit is located in Arrieta.

It is one of five "horn mountains" (Spanish: montes bocineros, Basque: deiadar-mendiak) in Biscay, peaks that were once used to announce General Assemblies in the region with horns and lights. The four other "horn mountains" include Kolitza, Ganekogorta, Gorbea and Oiz.
