= José Solchaga =

Spanish general (1881–1953)

José Solchaga Zala
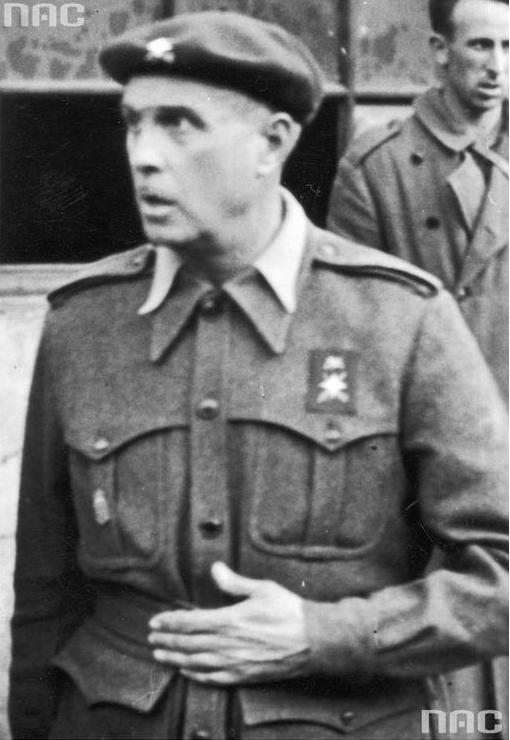
- Born: José Solchaga Zala; 1881
- Died: 1953 (aged 71–72)
- Military career
- Allegiance: Spanish State
- Branch: Army
- Commands: Commander of the Brigades of Navarre (1937); Turia Army Corps (1938); Navarre Army Corps (1938–1939)
- Conflicts: Spanish Civil War: Guipuzcoa; Biscay Campaign; Battle of Santander; Asturias Offensive; Aragon Offensive; XYZ Line; Catalonia Offensive; Final offensive

José Solchaga Zala (1881, Aberin, Navarre – 1953) was a Spanish general who fought for the Nationalists in the Spanish Civil War.

A Navarrese professional officer of the Spanish Army, in 1936 he joined the coup against the Republican government. He led the Navarrese troops in the campaign against Guipuzcoa. On 5 August 1936 his troops occupied Irún, cutting off the Republican-held zone in the North from the French Frontier and San Sebastían on 13 September. Later, he was promoted to General, led the Nationalist troops in the Biscay campaign. In August he led the Brigades of Navarre in the Battle of Santander, and in September 1937 he was one of the Nationalist commanders in the campaign against Asturias, and in March 1938 he led the Navarrese divisions during the Aragon Offensive. In June 1938 he led the Turia Army Corps in the XYZ Line battle. In December 1938, he led the Navarre Army Corps in the Catalonia Offensive, the fight for Barcelona in January 1939 and in March 1939 in the Final offensive of the Spanish Civil War.

== Bibliography ==
- Beevor, Antony (2006). The Battle for Spain: The Spanish Civil War 1936–1939. London: Penguin Books. ISBN 978-0-14-303765-1.
- Thomas, Hugh (2001). The Spanish Civil War. London: Penguin Books. ISBN 978-0-14-101161-5.
