= Juan Ibarrola =

Spanish military commander

Juan Ibarrola Orueta (1900 in Llodio, Álava – 1976) was a Spanish military commander who fought with the Republicans during the Spanish Civil War. He was a captain of the Civil Guard (Guardia Civil); unlike many of his fellow officers he rallied to the Republic when the Nationalist rising began. Featured in the war in Morocco, the coup d'état of July 1936 that led to the Civil War he was captain of the Guardia Civil in Bilbao and took command of a column to expel the rebels from the province of Álava without success.

He was unusual in the Republican Army as he was Catholic, but he was also a Basque and the Basques had generally rallied to the Republic. He was a medical instructor before the war.

He fought in the north of Spain, was promoted to command the 50th Division, and commanded the XI Army Corps at Teruel.
