= Biscay Campaign =

1937 offensive during the Spanish Civil War

- Part of the Spanish Civil War
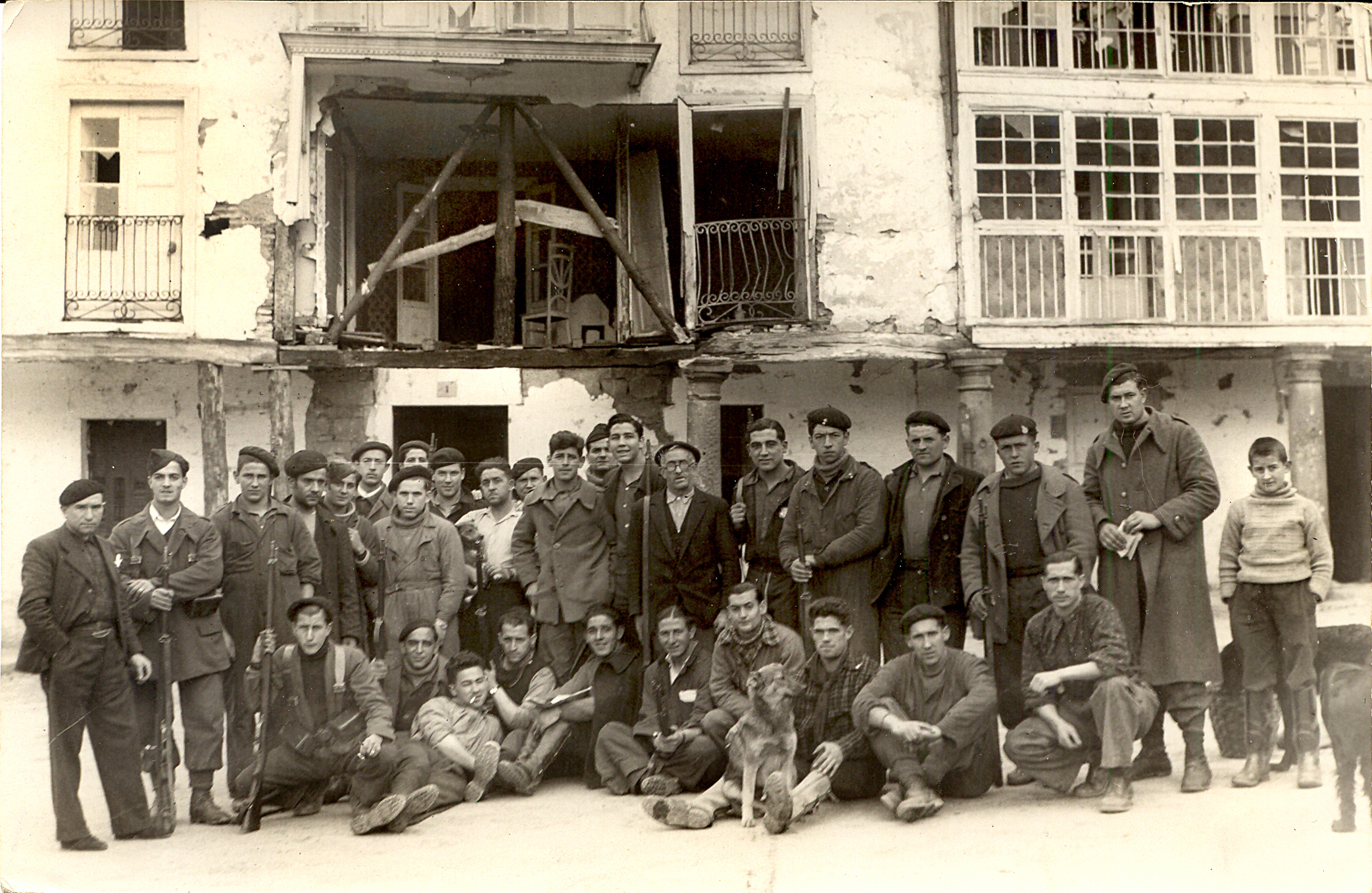
- A group of gudaris (Basque soldiers) in Elgeta, 1937.
Date	31 March – 1 July 1937
Location	Biscay, Spain
Result	Nationalist victory

Belligerents
(Spain) Spanish Republic (Basque Country (autonomous community)) Euzko Gudarostea; Isaac Puente Battalion	(Francoist Spain) Nationalist Spain (Nazi Germany) Condor Legion

Commanders and leaders
(Spain) General Francisco Llano de la Encomienda (Spain) General Mariano Gámir Ulíbarri	(Francoist Spain) Emilio Mola (Francoist Spain) General Fidel Dávila Arrondo (Francoist Spain) José Solchaga

Strength
Thomas: 40,000 men 55,000; 140 guns 25–30 aircraft 2 destroyers 3 submarines	65,000; 200 guns 150 aircraft 1 battleship 2 cruisers 1 destroyer

Casualties and losses
35,000 casualties (10,000 dead)	4,500 killed 25,500 wounded or missing

The Biscay Campaign (Spanish: Campaña de Vizcaya) was an offensive of the Spanish Civil War which lasted from 31 March to 1 July 1937. 50,000 men of the Eusko Gudarostea met 65,000 men of the insurgent forces. After heavy combats the Nationalist forces with a crushing material superiority managed to occupy the city of Bilbao and the Biscay province.

== Background ==
By late October 1936, all Gipuzkoa was occupied by the rightist rebel forces. The western front settled at the foot of Intxorta (Elgeta). However, Mola did not hide his plans to use air force against Basque territory loyal to the Republic. Despite Basque nationalist attempts at guaranteeing no shelling on civilians, Spanish Nationalist aircraft raided Bilbao on September 25 and 26, an indiscriminate attack on its starving population that spread a blaze of outrage across the city.

Oblivious to foreseeable consequences, the Nationalists resumed ferocious air strikes against the city on 4 January 1937, prompting yet another outcry of indignation and an assault on the prison-ships where right-wingers were being held. It resulted in a death toll of 224.

On 22 March 1937, Franco decided to halt his offensive against Madrid and start an offensive against the northern Republican held zone. The northern zone was politically divided and isolated from the central Republican zone. Furthermore, there was most of Spanish iron and coal and the chemical plants of Biscay. The Nationalists decided to start the occupation of the northern Republican zone with the conquest of the Biscay province.

== Opposing forces ==
The Nationalists had Emilio Mola's Army of the North (55,000 men). The Nationalist attack started with the Navarrese Division, led by the General José Solchaga. This division had four brigades led by the Colonels Garcia Valiño, Alonso Vega, Cayuela and Latorre (18,000 men) and the Black Arrow division (8,000 men with Italian officers). This force was established between Vergara and Villareal, on the border of the Biscay province. The Nationalist had also 200 guns, 120 aircraft, the battleship España, the heavy cruiser Canarias, the light cruiser Almirante Cervera, and the destroyer Velasco.

Opposing them, the Republicans had General Francisco Llano de la Encomienda's Army of the North, theoretically numbered 150,000, but there were no unity between the Basque Nationalists, the Asturians and the Santaderinos. The Basque Army in Biscay had 30,000 men (most of them Basque Nationalists and also Asturians). The Republicans also had 140 guns, 25-30 aircraft, two destroyers and three submarines.

== The offensive ==
The Nationalist offensive started on 31 March 1937 and Mola threatened to bomb the Basque cities and industries: "I have decided to terminate rapidly the war in the north: those not guilty of assassinations and who surrender their arms will have their lives and property spared. But, if submission is not immediate, I will raze all Vizcaya to the ground, beginning with the industries of war." The same day, the Aviazione Legionaria bombed the town of Durango, resulting in 250 civilian deaths. On 1 April the Colonel Camilo Alonso Vega captured the mountains of Maroto, Albertia and Jarindo, and the Navarrase troops attacked the town of Ochandiano and encircled the Basque troops in it. The Navarrese occupied the town on 4 April, after heavy combats and aerial bombardment. The Basque troops left 400 deaths and 600 prisoners. Then Mola decided to stop the advance due bad weather.

On 6 April. the Nationalist government in Burgos announced the blockade of the Basque ports. The British government said that the blockade was effective and warned British ships not to go to Bilbao. Nevertheless, British merchants broke the blockade and entered in Basque ports. On 20 April the Nationalists continued their offensive after a heavy artillery bombardment. The Basque troops led by Major Pablo Belderraín tried to resist but the 1st Navarrese Brigade led by Colonel Garcia Valiño broke the front and occupied Elgeta. The same day the Legion Condor bombed Guernica.

The Basques retreated to the Iron Belt line and the Legion Condor bombed the roads and woods with incendiary bombs. Then, the Lendakari, Jósé Antonio Aguirre, decided to assume the command of the Basque troops, due to the incompetence of Llano de la Encomienda. On 30 April, the Italians occupied Bermeo, but the Republican battleship Jaime I, was damaged by a mine. As the Nationalist troops approached Bilbao, the autonomous Basque government made an international plea to save the children of war flocking to the city. More than 20,000 were evacuated to 'temporary' safety on chartered boats, most of them to permanent exile.

== The fall of Bilbao ==
The Republican government tried to send fighters to the Basque country across France, but the French government returned the aircraft after confiscating their machine guns. The commander of the Spanish Republican Air Force, Hidalgo de Cisneros, decided to send 50 fighters and bombers to the Basque Country, across the Nationalist-held territory, 45 reached Bilbao.

Meantime, the bad weather stopped again the Nationalist offensive, a new shipment of weapons (55 antiaircraft guns, 30 cannons and two squadrons of Chatos), reached Bilbao, and the General Gámir was sent to Biscay in order to organize the defense of Bilbao and to replace Llano de la Encomienda. The Republican government launched two offensives in Segovia and Huesca to halt the Nationalist offensive against Bilbao but both failed.

Mola died on 3 June and was replaced by General Davila. On 11 June the Nationalist troops reached the Iron Belt and on 12 June after a heavy aerial and artillery bombing (150 guns and 70 bombers) the Nationalist troops assaulted it. A Basque deserter, Major Goicoechea, gave the plans of the Iron Belt to the Nationalists.

The Nationalists attacked Mount Urcullu and broke the Basque lines. On 14 June the Basque government left Bilbao; on 18 June, the Basque troops was ordered to leave the city and by 19 June the Nationalists conquered the city. 200,000 people were evacuated westwards to Santander, on trawlers first and cars, horse carts, lorries and on foot later. They were bombed by Condor Legion aircraft along the way.

== Aftermath ==
The Basque army temporarily stabilized the front on a line that runs south from the village of Ontón on the coast. Biscay had the only factory in Spain capable of the manufacture of artillery shells and half of the Spanish production of explosives. Virtually all manufacturing and shipbuilding industry remained intact, since the Basque nationalist authorities' opposed its destruction.

The arrival of the rebels to the city was followed by ransacking, murder, and pseudo-trials. 8,000 thousand were imprisoned for their Basque nationalist leanings, and many of them sent to forced 'work battalions'. In December, executions by fire-squad and garrote vil started to be conducted. The number of executions during and after the fall of Biscay is estimated at 916. The Basque autonomy was abolished and the Basque language forbidden.

== See also ==
- List of Spanish Nationalist military equipment of the Spanish Civil War
- Condor Legion
- Aviazione Legionaria
- List of Spanish Republican military equipment of the Spanish Civil War

== Bibliography ==
- Beevor, Antony (2006). The Battle for Spain. The Spanish Civil War, 1936-1939. Penguin Books. ISBN 978-84-672-1532-8.
- Preston, Paul (2012). The Spanish Holocaust: Inquisition and Extermination in Twentieth-Century Spain. UK: HarperCollins. p. 720. ISBN 9780007467228.
- Thomas, Hugh (1976). Grijalbo (ed.). The Spanish Civil War. London: Penguin Books. ISBN 84-253-2767-9.
