= Mere Green =

Mere Green may refer to:

- Mere Green, Birmingham, England
- Mere Green, Worcestershire, England
