= El Mazucu =

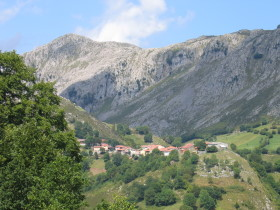
El Mazucu and the heights of Llabres

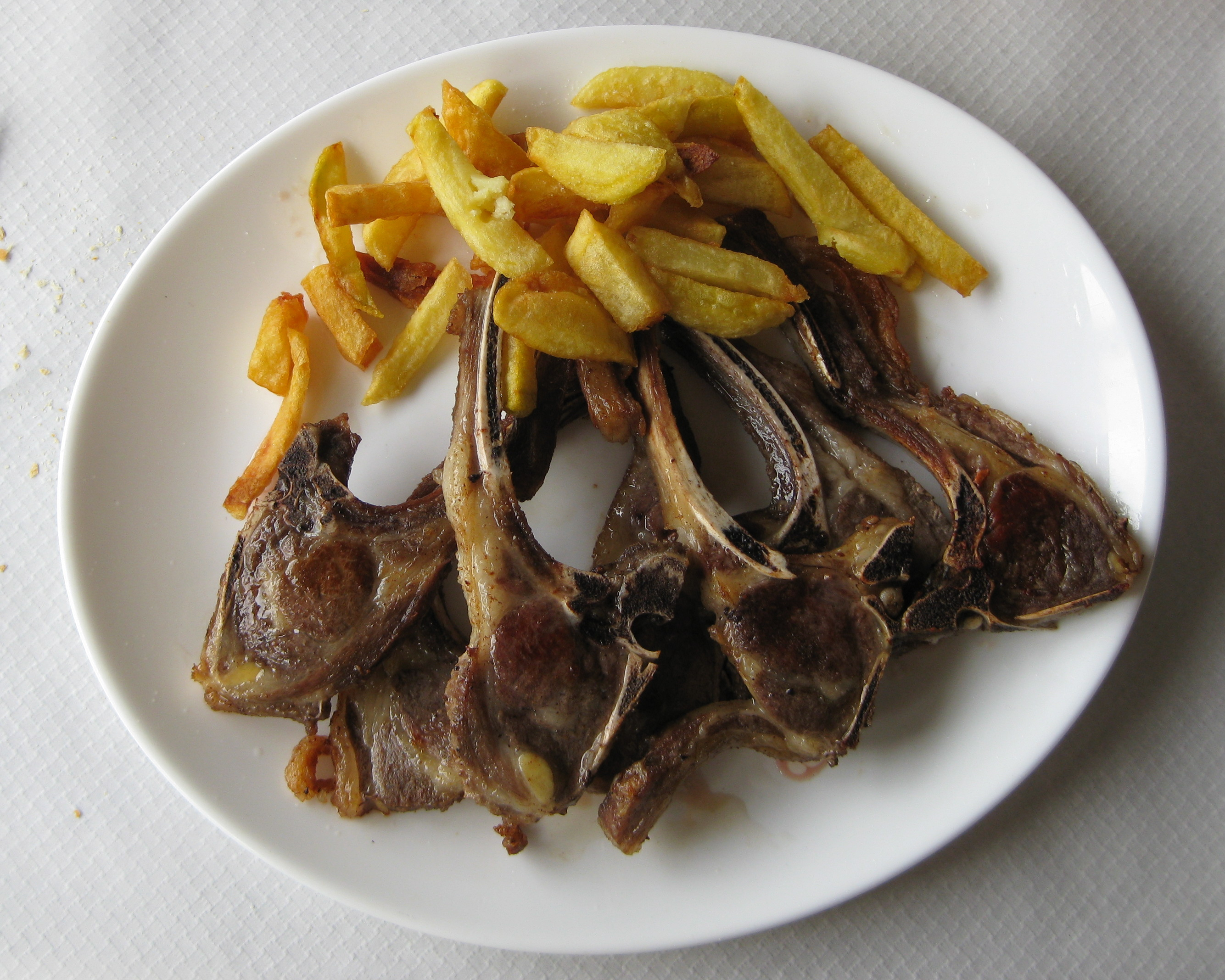
Chuletillas and chips at El Roxin

El Mazucu is a village in the parroquia of Caldueño in the municipality of Llanes, in Asturias, northern Spain. Its population in 2004 was 67, in 25 dwellings.

It is located at 355m above sea level in the Sierra de Cuera, at 43°22′56″N 4°51′08″W, which is 16 km from Llanes. The road from Llanes to Meré passes over the Alto de la Tornería at 471m then drops down to the Ermita del Santo Ángel at 362m, where a left turn leads immediately into the village. 2 km to the south is the highest point in the concejo of Llanes, Peña Blanca (1182m).

The village sits at the western end of a 2.5 km closed valley drained by the Río Belugas and the Río del Pasador, which join just before sinking into Cueva del Bolugo (43°22′45″N 4°51′03″W); the river passes nearly directly under the village to resurge at Caldueñin (43°22′48″N 4°51′54″W).

During the Spanish Civil War, El Mazucu was the focus of a major battle from September 6, 1937 to September 22, 1937, when 5,000 men of the Republican forces held off over 33,000 Nationalists in the Battle of El Mazucu; see El Mazuco (La defensa imposible).

The only commercial establishment in the village today is the popular bar/restaurant El Roxin, known for its traditional Asturian food and (at weekends) its grill.
