= Sierra de Cuera =

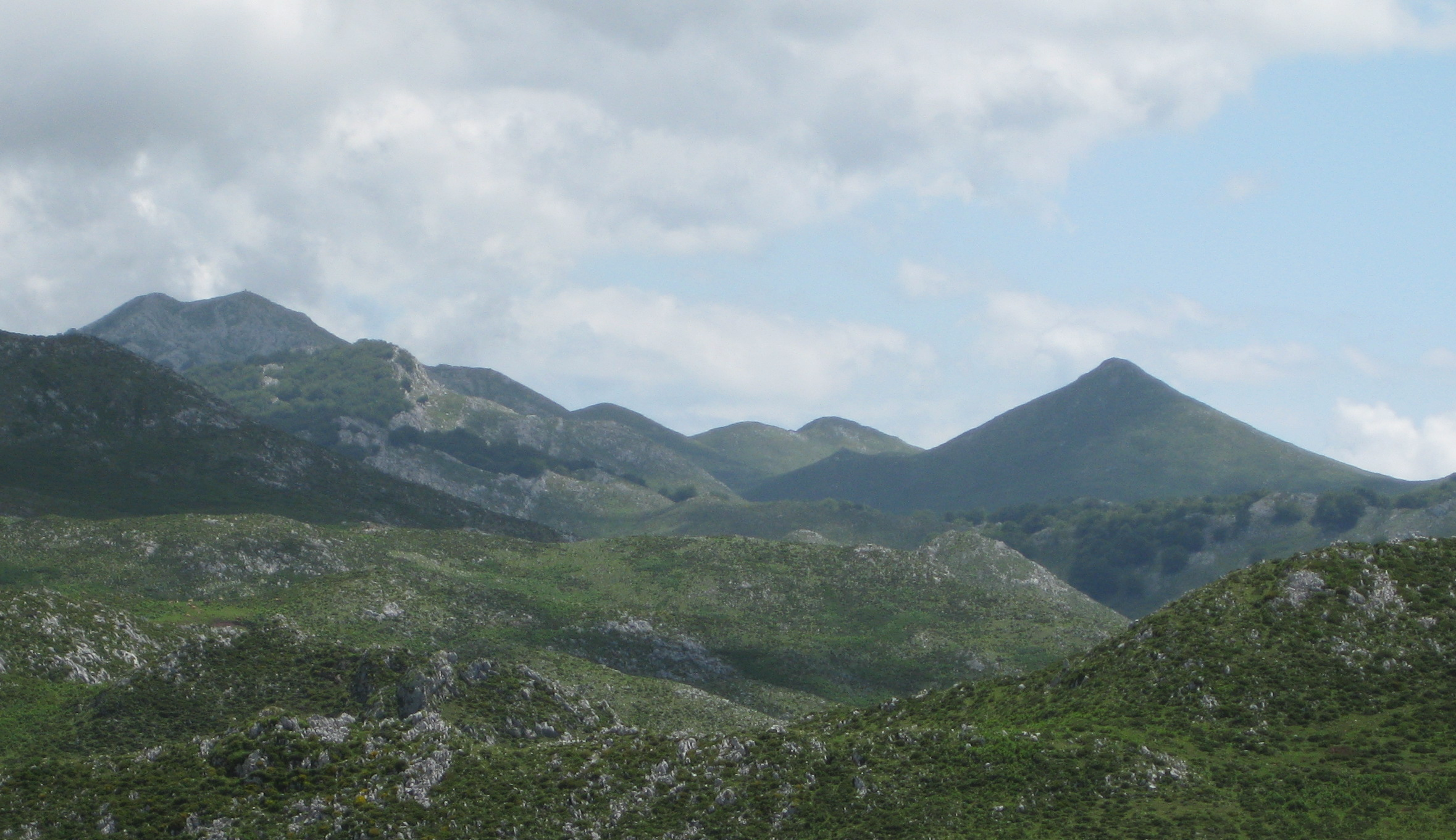
- Peña Turbina (left) and Peña Llacia

Highest point
- Peak: Peña Turbina
- Elevation: 1,315 m (4,314 ft)
- Coordinates: 43°21′14.77″N 4°46′11.58″W

Geography
- Location within Spain
- Location: Asturias, Spain
- Parent range: Cantabrian Mountains

Geology
- Mountain type: Limestone

Climbing
- Easiest route: Drive from Llanes or Cabrales

Sierra de Cuera (Asturian: Sierra del Cuera), is a 30 km long mountain chain of the Cantabrian Mountains. The ridge's highest point is Pico Turbina (1315 m). This mountain range is located at 6 km from the sea and runs parallel to the coast. It lies within the Cabrales, Llanes, Peñamellera Alta, Peñamellera Baja and Ribadedeva municipal terms.

== Recent history ==
The mountains of the Sierra de Cuera were vital to the defence of Asturias during the Spanish Civil War (1936 - 1939) and the key to the Sierra de Cuera was the pass of El Mazuco. Following the fall of Bilbao the troops supporting General Franco's rebellion tried to advance by clearing the Republican defenders from these mountains. In order to do this they planned a pincer movement moving south-west from Llanes and west, along the Río Cares, from Panes towards Cabrales. On both fronts, however, the rugged terrain and the stiff resistance of the Republican loyalists halted the advance during what became known as the Battle of El Mazuco.

== See also ==
- Battle of El Mazuco
