= Anarchist Immigrants in Spain and Argentina =

2015 book

- First edition
- Author: James A. Baer
- Subject: History of anarchism, history of immigration, Latin Americans
- Publisher: University of Illinois Press
- Publication date: 2015
- Pages: 264
- ISBN: 978-0-252-03899-0

Anarchist Immigrants in Spain and Argentina is a 2015 history book by James A. Baer on the intertwined anarchist movements of Spain and Argentina. The book delves into the period between 1868 and 1939, illuminating the transnational migration of anarchists between Spain and Argentina. Through the lives of key figures like Diego Abad de Santillán and Manuel Villar, Baer explores how these migrations shaped anarchist ideology and influenced the movement's growth in both countries. With insights drawn from extensive interviews and access to anarchist records, the book highlights the interconnectedness of anarchist migrants, their pursuit of jobs and political goals, and their significant impact on the histories of Spain and Argentina, particularly during the Spanish Civil War.

== Bibliography ==
- Barbosa, Rosana (July 2017). "Anarchist Immigrants in Spain and Argentina by James A. Baer". Canadian Journal of History. 52 (2): 407–409. doi:10.3138/cjh.ach.52.2.rev40. ISSN 0008-4107. S2CID 164733788.
- Cobos, Amparo Sánchez (May 2016). "Anarchist Immigrants in Spain and Argentina". Hispanic American Historical Review. 96 (2): 407–409. doi:10.1215/00182168-3484846. ISSN 0018-2168.
- Lee, Andrew H. (April 2016). "Rev. of Anarchist Immigrants in Spain and Argentina; Transnational Radicals. Italian Anarchists in Canada and the U.S. 1915–1940; Immigrants against the State. Yiddish and Italian Anarchism in America". International Review of Social History. 61 (1): 165–168. doi:10.1017/S0020859016000146. ISSN 0020-8590.
- Rodriguez, Julia (April 1, 2016). "James A. Baer. Anarchist Immigrants in Spain and Argentina". The American Historical Review. 121 (2): 539–540. doi:10.1093/ahr/121.2.539. ISSN 0002-8762.
- Zimmer, Kenyon (2016). "Review of Anarchist Immigrants in Spain and Argentina". Pacific Historical Review. 85 (4): 602–604. doi:10.1525/phr.2016.85.4.602. ISSN 0030-8684. JSTOR 26419699.
