= Camilo Alonso Vega =

Spanish military officer and minister

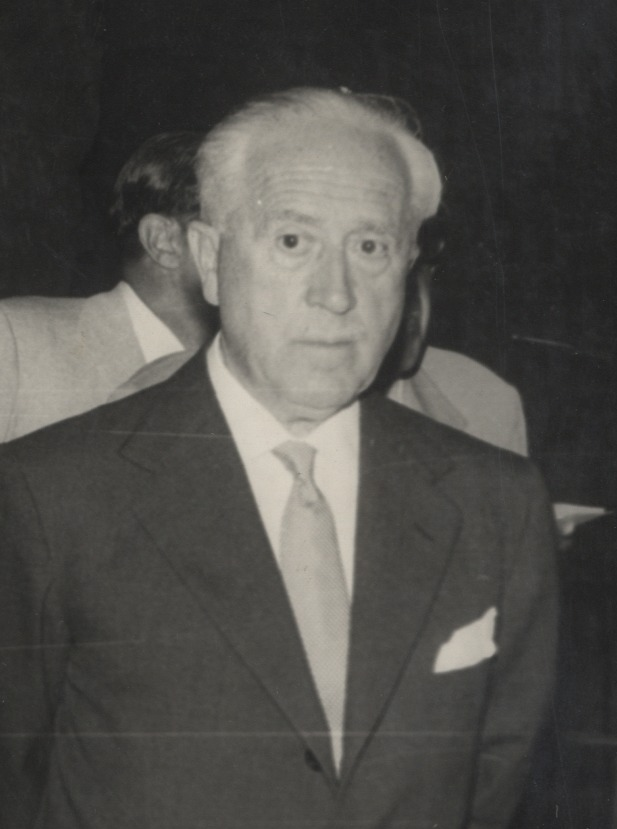
- Born: Camilo Alonso Vega; 29 May 1889; Ferrol, Spain
- Died: 1 July 1971 (aged 82); Madrid, Spain
- Military career
- Allegiance: Kingdom of Spain (1904–1932); Spanish Republic (1931–1936); Nationalist Spain
- Service years: 1907–1959
- Rank: Lieutenant general Captain general (ad honorem; 1969)
- Nickname: Don Camulo
- Commands: Brigade (1937–8); Division (1938–9).
- Conflicts: Spanish Civil War: Villarreal Offensive; Biscay Campaign; Battle of Brunete; Battle of Santander; Aragon Offensive; Battle of the Ebro

Camilo Alonso Vega (29 May 1889 – 1 July 1971) was a Spanish military officer and minister.

== Early life ==
A childhood friend of Francisco Franco, as a Captain he entered in the Spanish Legion and fought in the Rif War. He was initially assigned as commander of the 9th machinegun company of the 3rd Bandera of the Legion. Later he was promoted to Lieutenant Colonel of the Spanish Army in 1935 and full Colonel in December 1936 due to performance on the battlefield.

== Spanish Civil War ==
In July 1936, he supported the 17–18 July coup d’etat and helped conquer Vitoria, the capital city of the province of Alava for the rebels. In December 1936, he led the defense of the town of Villareal against an offensive of the Basque forces. In March 1937 he was appointed as commander of the 4th Brigade of the newly organized Mola’s Navarrese division and, he led this brigade in the Biscay Campaign, in the Battle of Brunete in July 1937, in the Battle of Santander in August, and in the Aragon Offensive, and on April 15 he took the town of Vinaròs (in the province of Castellón) cut in a half the Republican held zone. Later, he led a division in the Battle of the Ebro.

== Francoist Spain ==
After the war in January 1940, he became Sub-Secretary of the Ministry of the Army, which included supervising of the concentration camps and later the head of the Civil Guard (1943-1955). He was the Minister of the Interior of the Francoist Spain from 1956 to 1969. He retired from the military in 1959, remaining as Minister of the Interior nonetheless. He led the opposition inside the francoist government against the Fraga's Press Law. In 1969 he crushed the university demonstrations, because of this, he was nicknamed Don Camulo by the students (a portmanteau of his given name and mule).
