= Txiki =

Txiki (Basque, 'small' or 'youngster') is used as a nickname. Notable people with the nickname include:

== People ==
- Txiki (footballer, born 1977), Daniel Rodríguez Pérez, a Spanish footballer
- Txiki (footballer, born 1979), Cristian Urbistondo López, a Spanish footballer
- Txiki Begiristain (born 1964), a Spanish footballer
- Indalecio Sarasqueta (1860–1900), known as Txikito de Eibar or Aizpiri txiki, a Basque pelota player
- Lazkao Txiki (1926–1993), a Basque bertsolari poet and musician
- José María Benegas (1948–2015), a Spanish politician
- José Larrañaga Arenas (1926–1984), a Spanish politician

== Mythology ==
- San Martin Txiki, trickster in Basque mythology

== See also ==
- Aitz Txiki, a Basque mountain peak
