= Francisco Llano de la Encomienda =

Spanish military personnel (1880–1963)

- Born: 17 September 1879; Ceuta, Spain
- Died: 31 December 1963 (aged 84); Mexico City, Mexico
- Occupation: Soldier
- Known for: General in Spanish Civil War

Francisco Llano de la Encomienda (17 September 1879 – 31 December 1963) was a Spanish soldier who served in Morocco and was promoted to General in 1931. During the Spanish Civil War (1936–39) he remained loyal to the Second Spanish Republic. He was in command of the Spanish army garrison in Barcelona when a military revolt was attempted on 19 July 1936. He was imprisoned by the rebels, and after the revolt was relieved of his command. He was given command of the Army of the North in November 1936 but was not able to form a unified command. He was handicapped by regional jealousies and a mixed command of regular troops and militia. He was dismissed in May 1937 shortly before the north of Spain fell to the insurgents. He took refuge in Mexico after the war.

== Life ==
=== Early career ===
Llano de la Encomienda was born in 1879. He gained military experience in the Rif War in Morocco. He had two tours of duty in Morocco, where his performance was excellent. He was promoted to the rank of General in 1931.

=== Barcelona command ===
The Republican leaders trusted Llano de la Encomienda. They gave him command of the Barcelona division in February 1936, the 4th Division of the official army, although as a brigadier general he did not have the rank expected for that post. After General Francisco Franco launched his rebellion, Llano de la Encomienda told his officers on 18 July 1936 that he supported the Republican Union party, but given a choice between extremes would back the communists against the fascists. That day he assured the Catalan president Lluís Companys that there was no unrest among the troops in the Barcelona barracks. However, the troops began an uprising in the early hours of 19 July 1936 and captured key points in the city. There were 2,000 military rebels, but the Republicans had the support of the police and could call on 3,000 Civil Guards, 3,200 Assault Guards and 300 Mossos d'Esquadra.

Llano de la Encomienda was indecisive in his response to the crisis. He continued to give orders and make telephone calls in an effort to stop the revolt, which caused some confusion among the rebels. The Nationalist General Manuel Goded Llopis arrived in the city from Majorca and imprisoned Llano de la Encomienda. Led by the anarchists of the Confederación Nacional del Trabajo (CNT) and Federación Anarquista Ibérica (FAI) the workers organized themselves, joined by loyal troops and guards, and counterattacked the next day. After hard fighting they regained control of Barcelona. Llano de la Encomienda was dismissed from his command after the uprising. He was quarantined for a period, since after his poor performance during the revolt the Republican authorities were not completely sure of his loyalty.

=== Army of the North ===
Insurgent advances in the north March–September 1937

The Army of the North covered Asturias, Cantabria and the Basque Country. These regions maintained considerable political and military autonomy. In the mining region of Asturias the militias were led by Belarmino Tomás, head of the Popular Front committee for that region. The armed forces in Santander (Cantabria) were led by José García Vayas, formerly a battalion commander in Santoña. The Basque militias were militarized on 26 October 1936. José Antonio Aguirre, president of the Basque Country, set up and presided over a General Staff, placed war industries under control of the military and called up reservists. By 26 November 1936 the Basque forces numbered 25,000, with an artillery regiment and support services. They tried to form a Basque army, the Eusko Gudarostea, although the constitution prohibited this.

On 15 November 1936 Llano de la Encomienda was sent to Bilbao. He replaced Captain Francisco Ciutat de Miguel. Although he was technically commander of the Republican Army of the North, he completely failed to form a unified command. He did not have clear instructions about the role he was to play, and friction soon developed with Aguirre. The commanders of the three militia forces resisted any interference. Llano de la Encomienda was even subjected to a customs inspection when crossing the "border" from Asturias to Santander at Unquera. A cheese was confiscated. In November 1936 Llano de la Encomienda launched an attempt to capture Vitoria. This was a key objective, since it would open land communications between the Basque Country and France. The attempt failed.

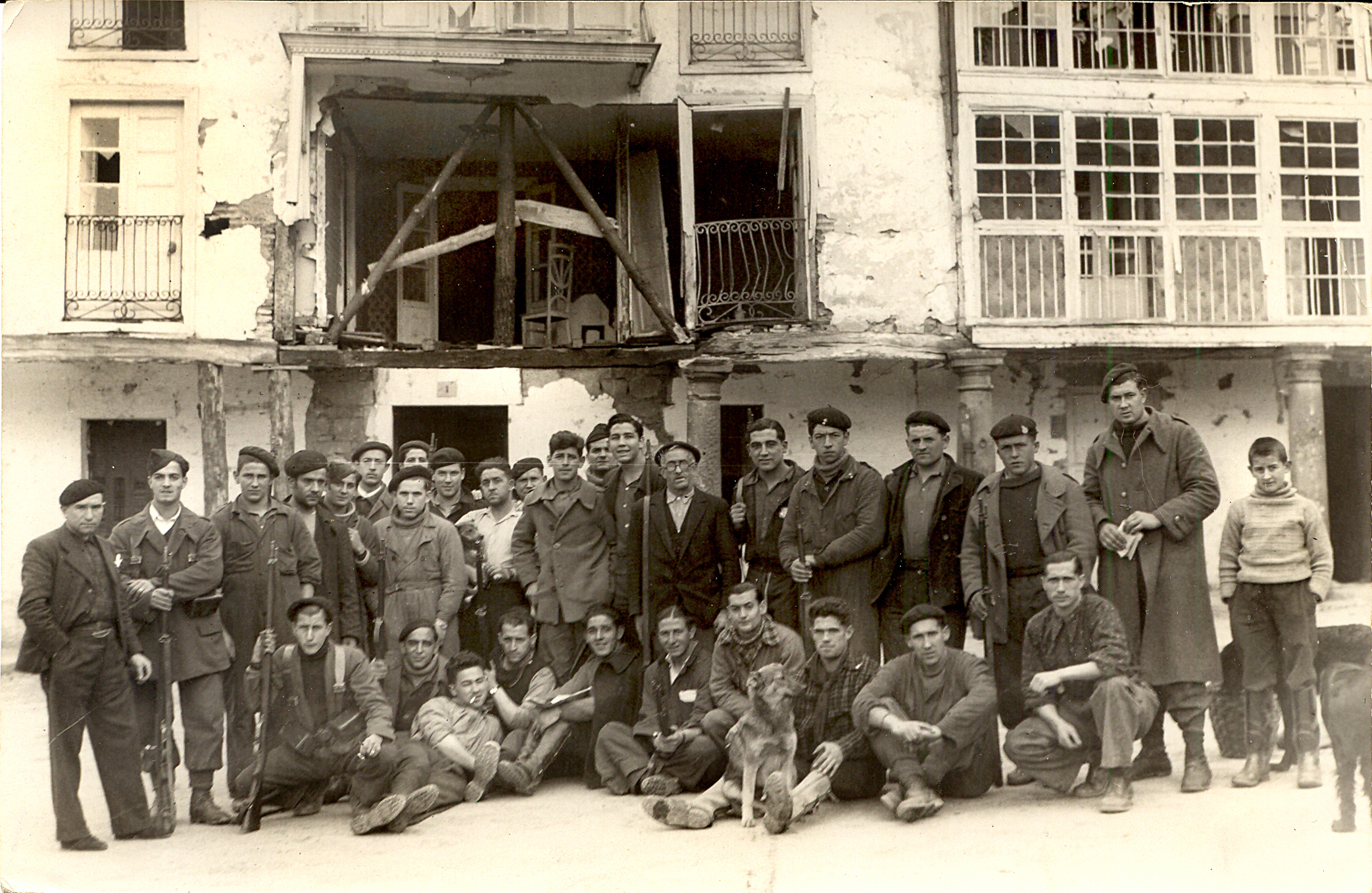
Basque pro-Republican fighters

On 13 January 1937 Aguirre informed Llano de la Encomienda that the Basque Council of Ministers had agreed that the Basque Government and its Minister of War retained jurisdiction over all war-related matters, and the use of human and material resources, apart from the command of military operations. It acknowledged his role in coordinating joint actions of the Basque, Santander and Asturian forces, and promised to supply aid to the Santander and Asturias units where possible. In effect, Aguirre had removed the Basque forces from Llano de la Encomienda's command. On several occasions Llano de la Encomienda complained bitterly to Spanish prime minister Francisco Largo Caballero about Aguirre's refusal to cooperate. Aguirre later said the Llano de la Encomienda's military advisers had been plotting to undermine the Basque Staff.

The Francoist General Emilio Mola began a campaign in the north on 31 March 1937. His first goal was to capture the industrial areas of Basque Country. The campaign was ruthless, using massive artillery strikes and bombing of cities such as Guernica to crush resistance. The Basque battalions finally obeyed Llano de la Encomienda's order to accept numbers and form into brigades. With the Insurgents advancing on Bilbao in April 1937, Aguirre asked for General José Asensio Torrado to be dispatched to Bilbao. The request was refused since Asensio was distrusted after the loss of Málaga. At the end of April Aguirre asked for General Sebastián Pozas Perea, saying Llano de la Encomienda was incapable of commanding the 60,000 men of the Basque forces. Aguirre called him "the personification of military incompetence." Aguirre personally took military command in May. On 27 May 1937 Llano de la Encomienda was officially replaced by General Mariano Gámir Ulíbarri.

=== Later career ===
Bilbao fell on 19 June 1937. Llano de la Encomienda was in Gijón until the last moment, then escaped by sea to France. He returned to Barcelona, and was subject to a trial concerning his activities in the north, from which he was acquitted. Llano de la Encomienda was later placed in charge of training. In April 1938 he was no longer thought fit for active command, but was Inspector-General of Infantry. After the fall of Catalonia he returned to the central zone. At the end of the war he escaped to France, and soon after moved to Mexico, where he died in 1963.

== Sources ==
- Alpert, Michael (2013-02-28). The Republican Army in the Spanish Civil War, 1936–1939. Cambridge University Press. ISBN 978-1-107-32857-0.
- Baer, James A. (2015-04-10). Anarchist Immigrants in Spain and Argentina. University of Illinois Press. ISBN 978-0-252-09697-6.
- Fernandez, José Maria (2006). La vallée du Nalón (in French). Editions Le Manuscrit. ISBN 978-2-304-92965-2.
- "Francisco Llano de la Encomienda". Sociedad Benéfica de Historiadores Aficionados y Creadores.
- Graham, Helen (2002-12-19). The Spanish Republic at War 1936-1939. Cambridge University Press. p. 247. ISBN 978-0-521-45932-7.
- Ibárruri, Dolores (1966). Autobiography of La Pasionaria. International Publishers Co. ISBN 978-0-7178-0468-9.
- Pagès i Blanch, Pelai (2013-10-10). War and Revolution in Catalonia, 1936-1939. BRILL. ISBN 978-90-04-25427-5.
- Ramón Puche Maciá (2008). "Biografi-as del bando republicano: Francisco Llano de la Encomienda". Archived from the original on 2008-07-03.
- Redondo, Gonzalo (1993). Historia de la Iglesia en España, 1931-1939: La Guerra Civil, 1936-1939 (in Spanish). Ediciones Rialp. ISBN 978-84-321-3016-8.
- Salvadó, Francisco J. Romero (2013-03-14). Historical Dictionary of the Spanish Civil War. Scarecrow Press. ISBN 978-0-8108-8009-2.
- Thomas, Hugh (2013-11-06). The Spanish Civil War: Revised Edition. Random House Publishing Group. ISBN 978-0-8041-5216-7.
