= Bilbao's Iron Ring =

Spanish Civil War fortifications around Bilbao

Coordinates: 39°56′N 0°34′W

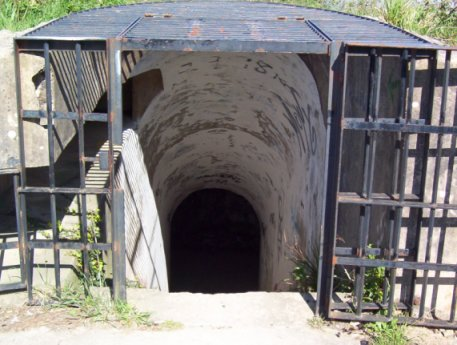
Bunker entrance in mount Artxanda

Bilbao's Iron Ring (Spanish: Cinturón de Hierro, Basque: Bilboko Burdin Hesia), is a fortification around Bilbao in the Basque Country, Spain. It was constructed hurriedly by the Basque Government during the Spanish Civil War to help defend the city from the Nationalist forces approaching as part of their War in the North campaign.

The Iron Ring was a vast labyrinthine fortification network around Bilbao, consisting of bunkers, tunnels, and fortified trenches in several rings, protected by artillery. However, despite the extensive coverage, it was an antiquated defence concept similar to First World War fortifications, which made it vulnerable to modern warfare weapons of the time, such as aircraft and artillery. Additionally, the fortifications were designed to hold 70,000 troops but were eventually only held by 30,000, less than half conceived to defend it. In February 1937, the monarchist engineer that coordinated the works, Alejandro Goicoechea, crossed to the Nationalist side carrying plans and documentation. Therefore, the Iron Ring was easily overcome by Nationalist forces in the Battle of Bilbao when it was breached by an infantry assault supported by heavy air and artillery bombardment from 150 guns and 70 bombers, and the system was completely defeated within two days.
