= Mariano Gámir Ulíbarri =

Spanish Civil War general

- Born: 1877; Madrid, Kingdom of Spain
- Died: 28 July 1962 (aged 84–85); Valparaíso de Abajo, Cuenca, Spain
- Military career
- Allegiance: (Restoration (Spain)) Kingdom of Spain (1893–1931) (Second Spanish Republic) Spanish Republic (1931–1939)
- Branch: Spanish Army; Spanish Republican Army
- Service years: 1893–1939
- Rank: General
- Commands: 5th Infantry Brigade (1936); 6th Infantry Brigade (1937); Northern Army (1937); 6th Infantry Brigade (1938)
- Conflicts: Spanish Civil War: Biscay Campaign; Battle of Santander

Mariano Gámir Ulíbarri (1877 – 28 July 1962) was a Spanish general who fought on the Republican side during the Spanish Civil War (1936–39). He was Basque, a career soldier, and had no political affiliation. He commanded a brigade on the Aragon front in the early months of the war, then was assigned to command the Basque forces in May 1937. He retreated westward from Basque country in June 1937 when attacked by greatly superior Nationalist forces. Soon after he was given command of the Army of the North, and tried to defend Santander. When this fell, he moved to Asturias, where he was replaced as commander. He escaped, returned to Valencia, and was briefly given command of a brigade, but was moved to a less responsible post due to doubts about his ability. After the war he lived in exile in France, where he wrote his memoirs, before being allowed to return to Spain a few years before his death.

== Early career ==
Mariano Gámir Ulíbarri was born in 1877 to a Basque family. He entered the Infantry Academy at the age of fifteen and advanced rapidly in the army due to his unusual technical skills and strength of character. He was appointed brigadier general in 1933, and a few months later was made director of the Toledo Infantry Academy. He remained loyal to the Republic when the Spanish Civil War began with General Francisco Franco's rebellion in July 1936. He was sent to Valencia in July 1936 and led the 5th Infantry Brigade. In early 1937 he also took command of the 6th Infantry Brigade. His troops played an active role on the Aragon front in the early stages of the Civil War.

== Army of the North ==
Insurgent advances in the north March–September 1937

At the start of Spring in 1937 there were two rival commanders of the Basque army. General Francisco Llano de la Encomienda had been appointed commander of the Army of the North by the Republic. José Antonio Aguirre, president of the Basque Country, had proclaimed himself commander of the Basque Army. The destruction of Guernica by bombing in April 1937 showed the weakness of the Republican defense. On 31 May 1937 Indalecio Prieto decided to appoint Gámir to command the Basque army. However, he was not given command of the rest of the Army of the North. Aguirre found Gámir more acceptable than Llano de la Encomienda. Gamir was truly apolitical, unconnected to any of the parties of the left, a qualified commander and a Basque.

When Gámir took command, the Basque Army had 85 battalions organized into Brigades and Divisions. There was a shortage of trained military commanders, and insufficient war materials. Gámir reorganized the staff, placing Commander Lamas in charge of it. In face of an immediate threat to Bilbao he ordered greater mobilization, accelerated work on fortifications and redeployment of the defending troops. However, the Francoist advance continued and by 16 June 1937 he had to order a general retreat to the west of the Nervión river. Gámir sent a telegram to the Minister of National Defense saying he planned to give up the Basque Country. Prieto ordered him to defend Bilbao to the last. However, Gámir took responsibility for the decision to evacuate the Basque government and retreat from Bilbao at a meeting on 16 June 1937 with the Basque government and General Llano de la Encomienda.

On 19 June 1937 Gámir left Bilbao just before the Nationalist troops entered the city. The front was pulled back to Cantabria. When he arrived in Santander, Gámir took effective command of the Army of the North. Llano de la Encomienda moved to Gijón in Asturias. On 25 June 1937 Gámir was given command of the Army of the North. Colonel Vidal took over what was left of the Basque Army. In the remaining defense of the north Gámir showed himself a capable professional, but did not have the forces needed to succeed against the Nationalists. To stop the advance of Franco's troops he had more than 80,000 soldiers grouped into four corps, nearly 300 artillery pieces, 40 aircraft and 17 anti-aircraft. The opposing forces under General Fidel Dávila had almost three times the strength. Gámir tried to recruit more soldiers, but could not raise enough to defend the front. He developed a plan to join up with the Aragon front in July 1937, but this was rejected by the Republican government. He had to deal with high levels of desertion among the troops from the conservative province of Santander, although the Asturian troops were more loyal to the republican cause.

The Nationalist offensive against Santander began on 14 August 1937. Gamir had 80,000 defensive troops, poorly equipped and with low morale, and 44 aircraft. Only 18 of the aircraft were modern fighters. The attacking forces of General Dávila included 90,000 troops including 25,000 soldiers in mechanized units. They had more than 200 aircraft including elite units from Italy and Germany. The city held 160,000 refugees, and its supply routes from the sea were being attacked by Nationalist ships and aircraft. On 22 August 1937 Gámir convened a meeting in Santander with José Antonio Aguirre, the government's Defense delegate, the military commanders and representatives of the political organizations. He proposed an immediate reduction in the length of the front, which was too broad to be defended. This was agreed, although the Basque troops chose to withdraw. The city of Santander fell on 26 August 1937.

Gámir and the staff of the Army of the North moved by submarine to Asturias, the last part of the north held by the Republic. When he arrived the Interprovincial Council of Asturias and Leon declared its sovereignty. The Council of Asturias elected Colonel Adolfo Prada to command the Army of the North in place of Gámir.

== Later career ==
Gámir took a plane from Gijón to France, and later returned from there to Valencia, where he took command of the 6th Infantry Brigade. He was subject to much criticism of his performance in the north, and was later removed from active command. Gamir was Spanish representative on the international commission that discussed withdrawal of foreign nationals from Spain. On 12 October 1938 he was appointed Inspector General of Military Education. After the fall of Catalonia he went into exile in France, where he wrote his memoirs. In the 1950s Franco gave him permission to return to Spain, and he took up farming in Cuenca. Mariano Gámir Ulíbarri died in 1962.

== Publications ==
- Gámir Ulibarri, Mariano; Miaja, J. (1939). "De mis memorias". Guerra de España. 1936-1939. Campaña del norte. Comisión internacional. Ediciones Estrella. p. 191.

== Sources ==
- Alpert, Michael (2013-02-28). The Republican Army in the Spanish Civil War, 1936-1939. Cambridge University Press. ISBN 978-1-107-02873-9.
- Cortabarría Igartua, Germán (2015). "Mariano Gamir Ulibarri". Euskomedia (in Spanish).
- "Mariano Gámir Ulíbarri (1877-1959)". Guerra Civil Espanola dia a dia. 2013-02-11.
- Payne, Stanley G. (1975). Basque Nationalism. University of Nevada Press. p. 209. ISBN 978-0-87417-042-9.
- Salvadó, Francisco J. Romero (2013). Historical Dictionary of the Spanish Civil War. Rowman & Littlefield. ISBN 978-0-8108-5784-1.
