= List of weapons of the Corpo Truppe Volontarie =

This is a list of weapons of the Corpo Truppe Volontarie which was an Italian ground force that supported the Nationalists during the Spanish Civil War. It was composed of regular Royal Italian Army soldiers and members of the Blackshirt Paramilitary organisation.

== Small arms ==
=== Rifles ===
- Carcano

=== Sidearms ===
- Beretta M1934
- Bodeo Model 1889

=== Machine guns ===
- Breda 30
- Fiat–Revelli Modello 1914

=== Submachine guns ===
- Beretta M1918

=== Mortars ===
- 81/14 Model 35 Mortar-for reference 8 look at the list you can download on the page

== Artillery ==
=== Field guns ===
- Cannone da 75/27 modello 11

=== Mountain guns ===
- Cannone da 65/17 modello 13-Most common artillery piece

== Armoured fighting vehicles ==
=== Tankettes ===
- L3/33
- L3/35
