= Condor Legion =

Nazi German unit in the Spanish Civil War (1936–39)

- Legion Condor
- Standard of the Condor Legion
- Active: July 1936 – March 1939
- Country: Nazi Germany
- Allegiance: Nationalist Spain
- Engagements: Spanish Civil War
- Decorations: Spanish Cross

Commanders
- Notable commanders: Hugo Sperrle; Wilhelm Ritter von Thoma; Wolfram Freiherr von Richthofen

Insignia

Aircraft flown
- Attack: Henschel Hs 123; Junkers Ju 87
- Bomber: Junkers Ju 86; Heinkel He 111; Dornier Do 17
- Fighter: Heinkel He 51; Heinkel He 112; Messerschmitt Bf 109
- Reconnaissance: Heinkel He 70
- Transport: Junkers Ju 52

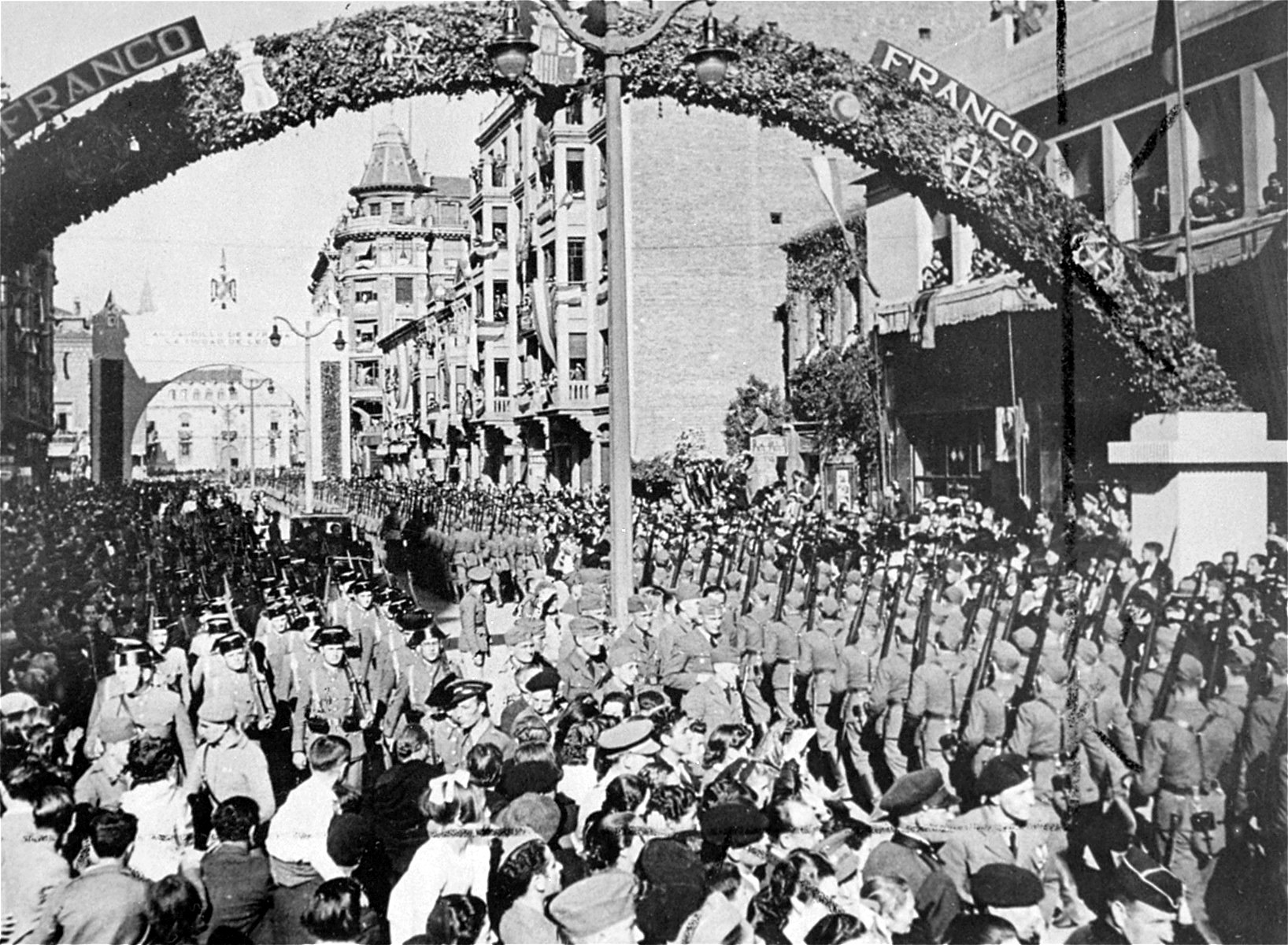
The Condor Legion marching in León during the Spanish Civil War

The Condor Legion (German: Legion Condor) was a unit of military personnel (Note: Wehrmacht soldiers who had been selected for Operation Condor were well-paid, and participation improved their chances for promotion in Germany.) from the air force and army of Nazi Germany's Wehrmacht which served with the Nationalist faction during the Spanish Civil War. The legion developed methods of strategic bombing that were used widely during the Second World War. The bombing of Guernica was the Condor Legion's most infamous operation. Hugo Sperrle commanded the unit's aircraft formations, and Wilhelm Ritter von Thoma commanded the ground element.

== Military aid to Spain ==
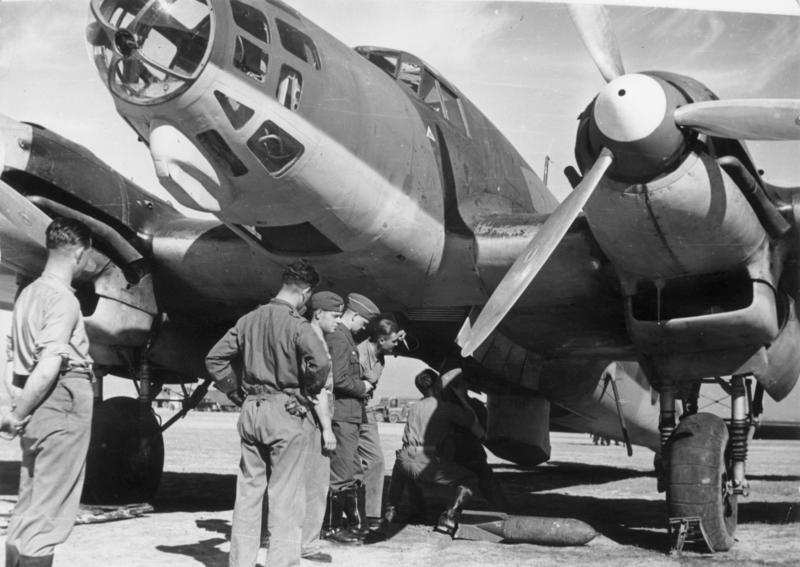
Condor Legion He 111E, 1939

After the 17 July 1936 military coup in Spain began the Spanish Civil War, the Nationalists requested support from Germany and Italy. The first request for German aircraft was made on 22 July, for 10 transport aircraft. Adolf Hitler decided to support the Nationalists on 25 or 26 July, but was wary of provoking a wider European war. The Reich Air Travel Ministry concluded that Nationalist forces would need at least 20 Junkers Ju 52s, flown by Luft Hansa pilots, to carry the Spanish Army of Africa from Spanish Morocco to Spain. This mission became known as Operation Magic Fire (German: Feuerzauber). To carry it out, a joint venture was created between the Spanish-German "Spanish-Moroccan Transport Company" (Spanish: Companía Hispano-Marroquí de Transporte, HISMA) dummy corporation and the German Raw Materials and Goods Purchasing Company (German: Rohstoffe-und-Waren-Einkaufsgesellschaft). German involvement was hidden from the foreign and the economic ministries, and was funded with three million Reichsmarks.

The organisation and the recruitment of German volunteers was also kept secret. The first contingent (86 men) left Germany on 1 August 1936. Unaware of their destination, they were accompanied by six biplane fighters, anti-aircraft guns and about 100 tons of other supplies. Many believed that the German troops would train the Nationalists and not engage in active combat.

The volunteers were stationed at Tablada Airfield near Seville and, with the support of German air transport, began the airlift of Francisco Franco's troops to Spain. Germany's involvement grew in September to encompass the Wehrmacht's other branches. Operation Magic Fire was renamed Operation Guido in November. The Kriegsmarine provided submarines in 24 October, also providing surface ships and co-ordinated movement of German supplies to Spain. German U-boats were dispatched to Spanish waters under the codename Ursula.

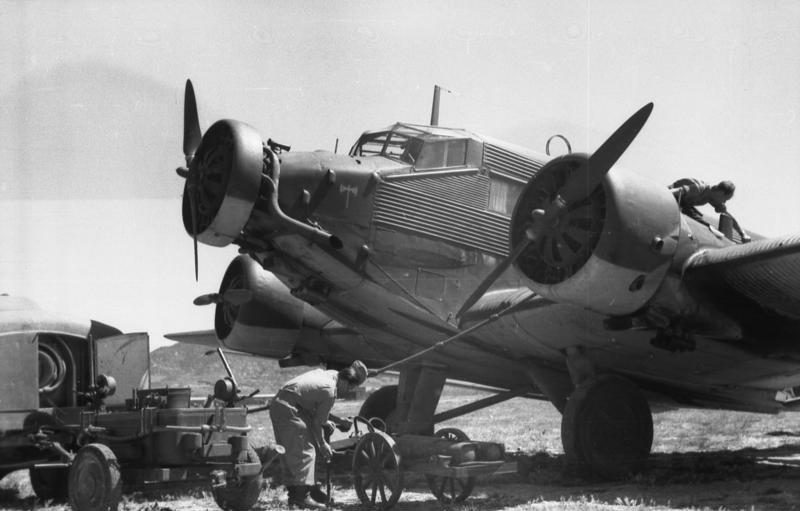
A Ju 52 plane in Crete in 1943

In the two weeks after 27 July, German transport moved nearly 2,500 Army of Africa troops to Spain. By 11 October (the mission's official end), 13,500 troops, 127 machine guns and 36 field guns had been transported to mainland Spain from Morocco. Over that period, there was a transition from training and supply missions to overt combat. The operation commander, Alexander von Scheele, was replaced by Walter Warlimont. In September, 86 tons of bombs, 40 Panzer I tanks and 122 personnel were deployed in Spain. They were accompanied by 108 aircraft from July to October, divided between aircraft for the Nationalist faction and planes for German volunteers in Spain.

German air crews supported the August-to-October 1936 Nationalist advance on Madrid, and the successful relief of the Siege of the Alcázar on 27 September 1936. Ultimately, the initial phase of the Siege of Madrid was unsuccessful. Soviet air support for the Republicans was growing, particularly through the supply of Polikarpov aircraft. Warlimont appealed to Germany to increase its support. After Berlin's recognition of Franco's government on 30 September, German efforts in Spain were reorganised and expanded. The existing command structure was replaced with the Winterübung Rügen; military units already in Spain were formed into a new legion, which was briefly called the Iron Rations (German: Eiserne Rationen) and the Iron Legion (German: Eiserne Legion) before Hermann Göring renamed it the Condor Legion (German: Legion Condor). The first German chargé d'affaires to Franco's government, General Wilhelm Faupel, (Note: See de:Wilhelm Faupel (in German).) arrived in November and was told not to interfere in military matters.

=== Motivation ===
In the years after the Spanish Civil War, Hitler gave several possible motives for German involvement. They included providing distraction from German rearmament, preventing the spread of communism to Western Europe, creating a state friendly to Germany to disrupt Britain and France, and creating possibilities for economic expansion. Although the Nationalist offensive on Madrid was abandoned in March 1937, a series of attacks on weaker Republican-controlled areas was supported by the Condor Legion. Despite prolonging the Civil War, it helped distract the other Western powers from Hitler's ambitions in Central Europe. The offensive on Biscay, a mining and industrial centre, helped to fuel German industry. In a speech at Würzburg on 27 June 1937, Hitler said that he supported Franco to gain control of Spanish ore.

Discussions about German objectives for intervention took place in January 1937. Germany was keen to avoid prompting a wider European war, which was a risk if it committed further resources to Spain. There was no consensus among German officials; Ernst von Weizsäcker of the German Foreign Office suggested that it was a matter of graceful withdrawal, and Göring said that Germany would never recognise a "red Spain". A joint Italian–German agreement said that the last shipments would be made no later than early February.

It has been speculated that Hitler used the Spanish Civil War to distract Benito Mussolini from Hitler's plans to annex Austria; the authoritarian, Catholic and anti-Nazi Vaterländische Front ran the government of Austria from 1933 to 1938, and had been allied with Mussolini. In 1934, the assassination of Austrian Chancellor Engelbert Dollfuss had given rise to Italian military assistance to prevent a German invasion.

A December 1936 communiqué from German ambassador to Rome Ulrich von Hassell said that Italy’s involvement in the Spanish Civil War kept it out of the Western powers' camp:

The role played by the Spanish conflict as regards Italy's relations with France and England could be similar to that of the Abyssinian conflict, bringing out clearly the actual, opposing interests of the powers and thus preventing Italy from being drawn into the net of the Western powers and used for their machinations ... All the more clearly will Italy recognize the advisability of confronting the Western powers shoulder to shoulder with Germany.

== Military operations ==
The Condor Legion originally consisted of the Kampfgruppe 88 with three squadrons of Ju 52 bombers and the Jagdgruppe 88, with three squadrons of Heinkel He 51 fighters; the reconnaissance Aufklärungsgruppe 88 supplemented by the Aufklärungsgruppe See 88, an anti-aircraft group (the Flakabteilung 88); and the Nachrichtenabteilung 88 signals group. The anti-aircraft guns used by Flakabteilung 88 were the standard German anti-aircraft guns of the time: the 8.8cm Flak 18, 3.7cm Flak 18 and 2cm Flak 30. Overall command was given to Hugo Sperrle, with Alexander Holle chief of staff. Scheele became a military attaché in Salamanca. Also operational were two armoured units under the command of Wilhelm Ritter von Thoma, with four Panzer I tanks each.

The Nationalists were supported by German and Italian units and material in the Battle of Madrid, but its military situation remained poor for them. Under orders from Francisco Franco, German and Italian aircraft began bombing raids on the city. The Germans were keen to observe the effects of bombing and the deliberate burning of civilian sites on a city. Offensives involving German aircraft, and the bombings, were unsuccessful. Growing Republican air superiority became increasingly apparent, particularly the strength of the Soviet Polikarpov I-15 and I-16 aircraft, but historian Hugh Thomas described their armaments as "primitive".

Faupel advocated the creation of a single German unit of 15,000 to 30,000 men in November and December 1936, which he believed would be enough to turn the tide of the war toward the Nationalists. Hans-Heinrich Dieckhoff said that this would be insufficient, and larger measures could provoke Spanish wrath. New aircraft were sent to the Condor Legion between late 1936 and early 1937, including Henschel Hs 123 dive bombers and prototypes of the Heinkel He 112 and Messerschmitt Bf 109; the latter was the most successful. The Heinkel He 111 was added to the bomber fleet, along with the Dornier Do 17 E and F types. Older aircraft were passed on to the Nationalists. By the end of 1936, about 7,000 Condor Legion personnel were in Spain. (Note: By comparison, 14,000 Italians supported Franco's forces.)

German forces also operated in the Battle of Jarama, which began with a Nationalist offensive on 6 February 1937. It included German-supplied ground forces, including two batteries of machine guns, a tank division, and the Condor Legion's anti-aircraft guns. Bombing by Republican and Nationalist aircraft, including Ju 52s from the Legion, created a stalemate and demonstrated the inadequacy of Legion aircraft when faced with superior Soviet-made fighters. Von Thoma requested Irish nationalist support for a tank advance at one point. The use of He 51 and Ju 52s and the Legion's anti-aircraft guns in ground roles only partly mitigated the Nationalist defeat in the March Battle of Guadalajara. A joint Italian-German general staff had been set up in January 1937 to advise Franco on war planning. The defeat of a significant Italian force and growing Soviet superiority in tanks and aircraft led the Germans to support a plan to abandon the offensive on Madrid and concentrate a series of attacks on weaker Republican-controlled areas. Some concluded that motorised troops were less effective than they had been thought, and the inadequacy of the Italians as a fighting force had become apparent to the Germans.

=== Biscay campaign ===
The isolated area of Biscay, a predominantly-Basque region of northern Spain, was the most immediate target in what was called the War in the North. It was largely a Nationalist and Italian offensive, supported by a consistently re-equipping Condor Legion. The terrain was favourable, with planes coming over a range of mountains to the south which masked their entrance. Sperrle remained in Salamanca; Wolfram von Richthofen replaced Holle in January as deputy, and was in actual command. Since the Basque air force was limited, fighter aircraft were used in ground-attack roles rather than air-to-air combat. The Legion's air force initially attacked the towns of Otxandio and Durango. Durango had no anti-aircraft defence, and only a few other defences. According to the Basques, 250 civilians died there on 31 March (including a priest, nuns and the congregation at a church ceremony). The Germans, because of their air raids, were hated. The Basque ground forces were in full retreat towards Bilbao through the town of Guernica, which was bombed on 26 April in one of the war's most controversial attacks.

=== Guernica ===
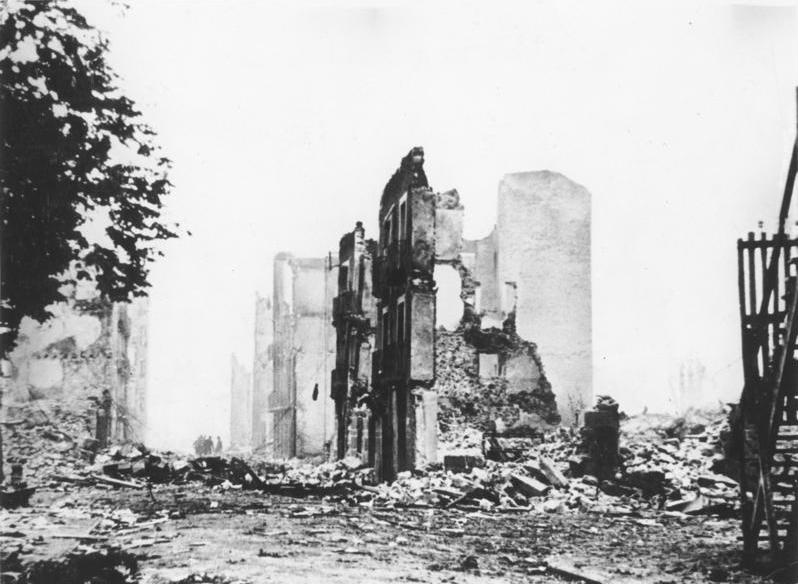
Ruins of Guernica (1937)

In Operation Rügen, waves of Ju 52 and He 111 planes bombed and strafed targets in Guernica. The number of casualties is controversial, with perhaps 200 or 300 people killed; the Basques reported 1,654 dead and 889 wounded. Several explanations were given by the Nationalists, who blamed the attack on the Republicans, said that the attack was part of a prolonged offensive, or the Rentería bridge outside Guernica was the true target. The nature of the operation, however (including its formation and armaments), undermines the credibility of these explanations. Guernica was a clear target of the Condor Legion, rather than the Nationalists. The 11 July offensive against Bilbao was supported by Condor Legion ground units and extensive air operations, proving the Legion's worth to the Nationalist cause.

The first English-language media reports of the destruction of Guernica appeared two days after the attack. George Steer, a reporter for The Times who was covering the Spanish Civil War from inside the country, wrote the first full account. Steer's reporting set the tone for much of the subsequent reportage, noting clear German complicity in the action. (Note: George Steer was a special correspondent for The Times, where his article first appeared on April 28. It was reprinted in The New York Times that day. Part of his report read, "Guernica was not a military objective ... The object of the bombardment was seemingly the demoralisation of the civil population and the destruction of the cradle of the Basque race".) Three small bomb cases stamped with the German imperial eagle made it clear that the German position of neutrality in the war and the signing of a non-intervention pact were meaningless, and German forces were actively participating in combat. Steer's report was syndicated worldwide, generating widespread shock, outrage and fear.

=== Other campaigns ===
The Condor Legion also took part in the Battle of Brunete, a Republican offensive designed to take the pressure off northern Spain where fighting was ongoing. The Legion was sent from the north to reinforce a broken line. There were repeated raids by bombers and by fighters based in Salamanca on Republican armoured vehicles and, later, defensive positions. Despite Nationalist fears, Republican aircraft were ineffective compared with German aircraft; the Messerschmitt Bf 109 was superior to the I-15 and I-16 models used by Republican forces. The Legion lost eight aircraft, but claimed 18 victories. German tactics improved after Brunete, particularly the en masse use of tanks by the Nationalists.

The Nationalists again focused on capturing northern Spain. The latest models of German test aircraft faced an outdated Basque air force which had some Soviet planes. Heavy aerial bombardment by 200 Nationalist, German, and Italian planes occurred far behind Basque lines in August 1937 and led to the fall of Santander after 1 September. The battle in Asturias ended with the fall of Gijón on 21 October. The Legion used a large amount of ammunition, including a million machine gun rounds and 2,500 tonnes of bombs.

After the Nationalist conquest of Asturias, much of the region's industrial and mineral production was shipped to Germany, demanded as repayment for the service of the Legion.

Sperrle argued repeatedly with Faupel against HISMA's monopoly, and Franco demanded Faupel's replacement. Sperrle also returned to Germany, and was replaced by Hellmuth Volkmann. After disagreements with Volkmann, Von Richthofen was replaced with Hermann Plocher in early 1938.

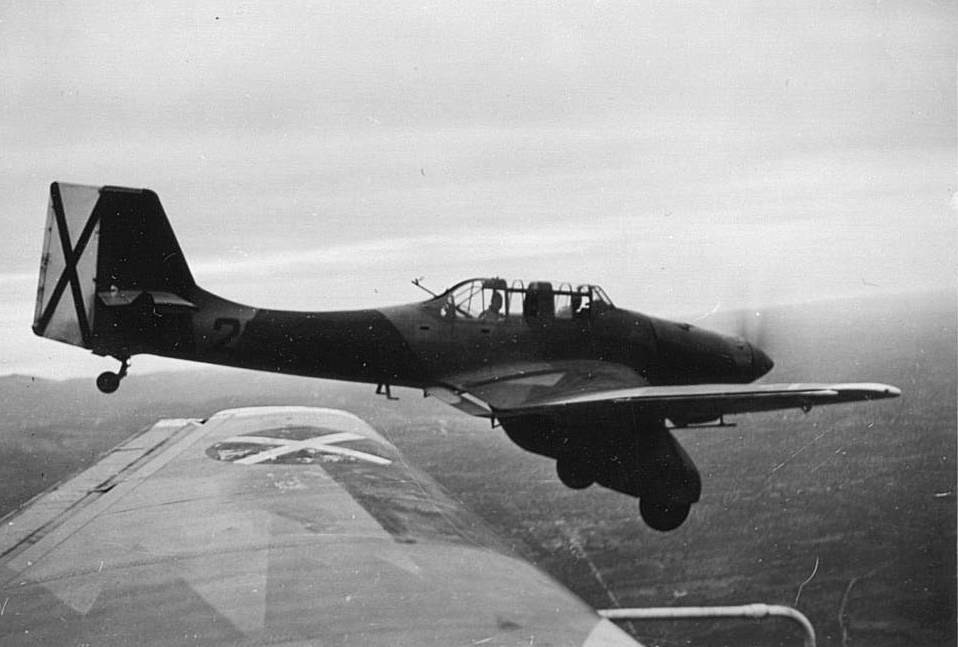
A Junkers Ju 87A with Condor Legion markings

After the next major campaigns (Madrid and Barcelona), the Condor Legion was moved to Soria and began a week of strikes against Republican airfields. This move was halted by the Republican advance on Teruel. The Legion's land and air forces were deployed in Bronchales. Poor weather resulted in few flights, and the town fell to Republican forces on 6 January.

Up to 100 sorties a day were launched during the Nationalist's counter-offensive through the Alfambra Valley. The Junkers Ju 87A was used for the first time in the advance on Teruel, which was retaken on 22 February. The continued Nationalist offensive in Aragon from April to June 1937, including the Battle of Belchite, involved bombing raids and the Legion's ground forces.

The Legion was switched to focus in the north, towards the Segre River, before moving south again after Nationalist successes. It moved its headquarters to Benicarló; single-engine planes operated from nearby airfields, and twin-engine planes from Zaragoza.

Hitler's words to his colleagues belied a change in attitude about the war in Germany; a quick victory was undesirable, and a continuation of the war would be preferable. German policy was to prevent a Republican defeat. Casualties were beginning to mount for the Legion and – combined with a resurgence in Republican air activity – the Nationalist advance stalled, perhaps because of the reluctance of German commanders to supply reinforcements in light of the emerging Czechoslovak crisis. Debates about the operation's rising cost to the Germans — then about 10 million Reichsmarks a month — continued unresolved. The Legion's materiel was exhausted.

Republican forces launched their last major offensive of the war, the Battle of the Ebro (24–25 July). Condor Legion reconnaissance units had noticed a troop build-up and warned Nationalist forces, but their warning went unheeded. Although the Republicans gained ground, they failed to gain control of Gandesa; 422 sorties by the Legion (with around 70 aircraft operational) had a considerable effect. The rest of the battle saw a series of artillery attacks or air strikes, followed by a Nationalist ground advance.

Tensions in Czechoslovakia and a pilot shortage in Germany led to the return of 250 aircrew from the Legion, about half of whom were bomber crew. Although trained Spaniards made up some of the shortfall, Volkmann complained to central command in Berlin and was recalled in September. During the 113-day battle, 10 Legion aircraft were lost (some by accident) and 14 were badly damaged. The Legion claimed about 100 Republican aircraft, one-third of those lost; five aircrew were killed, and six captured. Aid from Germany temporarily halted in mid-September. Germany and Nationalist Spain settled the issue of German interests in Spanish mines.

The Legion took a short break from active duty to receive new aircraft (including Bf 109Es, He 111Es and Js, and Hs 126As), which brought its strength to 96 aircraft — about one-fifth of the Nationalist force. Richthofen returned to Spain in overall command, with Hans Seidemann as chief of staff. That reinforcement may have been the most important intervention by a foreign side in the war, enabling a counterattack after the Battle of the Ebro. The Legion primarily took part in operations against the remaining Republican air force in January and February 1939, with considerable success.

The war ended in 1 April 1939. The Legion participated in victory parades in Barcelona and elsewhere, performed minor duties over Madrid, and then was disbanded. On 26 May, the men departed for Germany. The best aircraft were also returned to Germany, and the rest of the equipment was bought by the new Spanish regime.

The Condor Legion claimed to have destroyed 320 Republican planes with aircraft (shot down or bombed on the ground) and to have shot down another 52 with anti-aircraft guns. It claimed to have destroyed 60 ships, including Spanish Republican Navy vessels. The Legion lost 72 aircraft from hostile action, and another 160 from accidents.

=== Maritime operations ===
The Maritime Reconnaissance Staffel 88 (German: Aufklärungsstaffel See 88) was the Condor Legion's maritime unit under the command of Karl Heinz Wolff. Operating independently of the land-based division, it acted against enemy shipping, ports, coastal communications and occasionally inland targets such as bridges. It used floatplanes, starting with the Heinkel He 60, which began operating at Cádiz in October 1936. Missions started as reconnaissance, but after the move from Cádiz to Melilla in Spanish Morocco in December 1936, the focus shifted to attacks on shipping. It was again moved in February 1937 to Málaga, which was newly captured, and then to Mallorca when Málaga proved unsuitable. In June, operations began to be expanded to allow attacks on all Republican ports as long as British ships were not present. There were 10 ships attacked in the second half of 1937, but the Norwegian torpedoes that were used proved ineffective, and strafing or bombing targets was used instead.

The arrival of Martin Harlinghausen (known as "Iron Gustav") saw operations expand, and operations targeted Alicante, Almería, Barcelona and Cartagena. As naval activity declined, inland targets became more numerous, and night missions began. Activities in support of ground forces became the main focus of the unit until the end of hostilities. Both Wolff and Harlinghausen received the Spanish Cross in Gold with Swords and Diamonds. In total, eleven men were killed in action, and five others died due to accident or illness.

==== Other operations ====
Overtly, the Kriegsmarine was partly used to enforce the Non-Intervention Agreement from interfering in the war. However, the agreement was clearly broken by Germany. As a result, the German pocket battleship Deutschland stood guard over Ceuta to prevent interference from Republican ships while Franco transported troops to the Spanish mainland. By mid-October, the German North Sea Group around Spain consisted of the pocket battleships Deutschland and Admiral Scheer, the light cruiser Köln, and four torpedo boats. After the Germans claimed that Leipzig had been attacked by an unidentified submarine, it was formally withdrawn from international patrols.

Operation Ursula, named after the daughter of Karl Dönitz, involved a group of German U-boats active around Spain. It began on 20 November 1936, with the movement of the U-33 and the U-34 from Wilhelmshaven. Identification marks were obscured, and the whole mission was kept secret. Difficulties in identifying legitimate targets and concerns about discovery limited their operations. During their return to Wilhelmshaven in December, the Republican submarine C-3 was sunk; the Germans claimed that the sinking resulted a torpedo fired by U-34, although the Republican enquiry claimed its loss to have been caused by an internal explosion. Their submarines' return marked the official end of Operation Ursula. However, further submarines seem to have been sent in mid-1937, but details of the operation are not known (although six are believed to have been involved).

=== Abwehr ===
The German Abwehr intelligence service, independent of the Condor Legion, was secretly involved in Operation Bodden and later played a part in the detection of the Operation Torch invasion fleet. (Note: "Bodden" refers to the strait separating the Baltic island of Rügen from the German mainland, and the Abwehr operation was a network of coastal listening stations overseeing a seabed detection system across the Strait of Gibraltar. Bodden's aim was to gather SIGINT via the underwater detection system and fourteen infra-red ship surveillance stations (nine in Spain and five in Morocco), which later relayed shipping information to U-boats in the Mediterranean and threatening convoys.)

=== Return to Germany ===
The KdF fleet, including the MV Wilhelm Gustloff and seven other ships, were given secret orders on 20 May 1939 and diverted from their regular pleasure-cruise schedule to arrive in Vigo, Spain. They arrived on 24 May to pick up the legion, and departed on 26 May for a five-day voyage to Hamburg, Germany. They arrived to crowds, parades and ceremonies celebrating their success, with Hermann Göring and other high-ranking officials in attendance.

== Military gains ==
=== Training ===
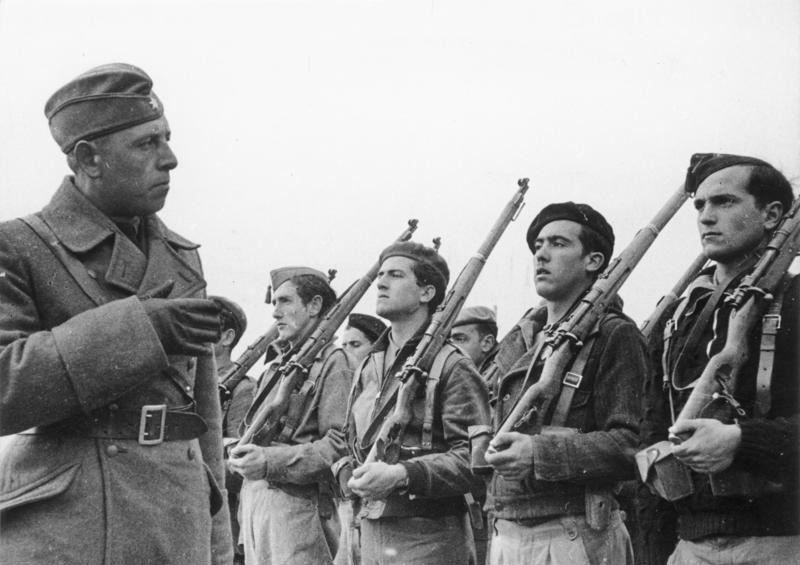
A Condor Legion infantry-training school in Ávila, Spain

Many army leaders were hesitant to become involved in the conflict, and resisted a call from the Italian government for a transfer of ground troops to Spain. Luftwaffe involvement was not restricted, and it is commonly thought that its involvement in the Spanish Civil War was a proving ground for troops in World War II. That view is supported by the testimony of Hermann Göring when he was on trial in Nuremberg. Asked about the decision to use the Luftwaffe, Göring said:

When the Civil War broke out in Spain, Franco sent a call for help to Germany and asked for support, particularly in the air. One should not forget that Franco with his troops was stationed in Africa and that he could not get the troops across, as the fleet was in the hands of the Communists, or, as they called themselves at the time, the competent Revolutionary Government in Spain. The decisive factor was, first of all, to get his troops over to Spain. The Führer thought the matter over. I urged him to give support [to Franco] under all circumstances, firstly, in order to prevent the further spread of communism in that theater and, secondly, to test my young Luftwaffe at this opportunity in this or that technical respect. (Note: This is frequently misquoted along these lines: "The Spanish Civil War gave me an opportunity to put my young air force to the test, and a means for my men to gain experience".)

It was cited in Western media after German forces left Spain.

Dozens of Messerschmitt Bf 109 fighters, Heinkel He 111 medium bombers and, after December 1937, at least three Junkers Ju 87 Stuka dive bombers first saw active service in the Condor Legion against Soviet aircraft. The Stuka's first mission in Spain was in February 1938, and each aircraft played a major role early in World War II. The Germans realised that biplane fighters were quickly becoming less effective than newer monoplane designs. The Heinkel He 51 fighter, after many losses during the first twelve months of the war, was switched to a ground-attack role and later saw service as a trainer.

=== Other units ===
The Condor Legion included ground-combat units. Panzer crews operating Panzer I light tanks were commanded by Wilhelm Ritter von Thoma. The Germans also tested small numbers of 88 mm Flak 18 anti-aircraft artillery guns to destroy Republican tanks, fortifications and aircraft with direct fire. German involvement in Spain spurred development of the first air ambulance service for evacuation of wounded combatants. (Note: Details on the 1936-1939 operation can be found in The History of Anesthesia Contributions of the Legion Condor to the Wehrmacht's surgical care during World War II. (R.J. Defalque, A.J. Wright).)

=== Technical advances ===
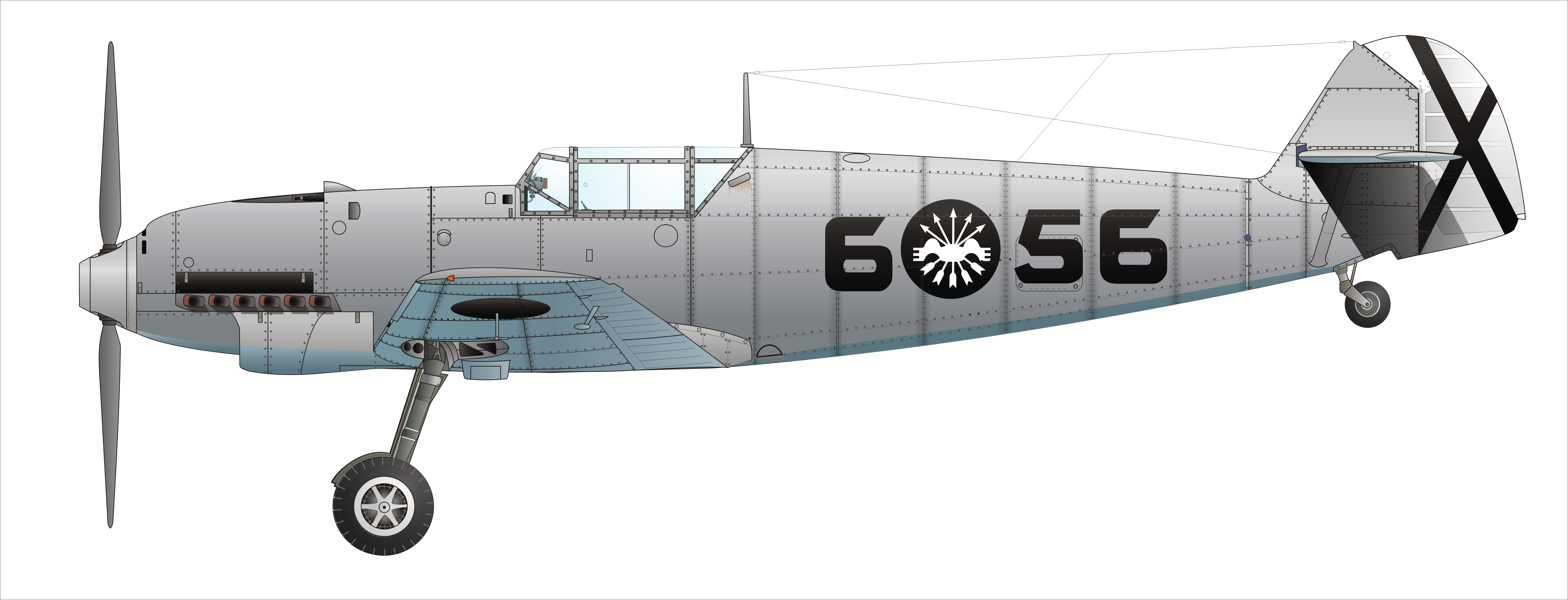
A Condor Legion Bf 109 C-1, Jagdgruppe 88

One military innovation thought to have resulted from the conflict is the technical development of the Messerschmitt Bf 109. The V3 to V6 types entered service in Spain from operational trials around January 1937. They were joined by type C aircraft in spring 1938, with type Es first deployed in December of that year.

=== Tactics ===
In addition to combat experience, it is thought that strategic initiatives were first tested during Luftwaffe involvement in the Spanish Civil War. Legion commander in Spain Wolfram von Richthofen became a Field Marshal during World War II and served in high Luftwaffe positions, specialising in ground attacks. His units spearheaded offensives in Poland, France and the Low Countries and the Balkans, and in Operation Barbarossa.

Joint operations were emphasised. Close air support for Nationalist troops, attack bombing of Republican troop concentrations, and strafing were features of the war. The legion worked to maximise the fighting ability of the Nationalist air force and troops, the Italian CTV, and pilots from the Aviazione Legionaria (Legionary Air Force). German air ace Adolf Galland said that in focusing after World War II on lessons learned by the Germans from the conflict in Spain, the value of the lessons was exaggerated. Galland believed that the wrong conclusions were drawn by the German High Command, particularly regarding the Luftwaffe:

Whatever may have been the importance of the tests of German arms in the Spanish Civil War from tactical, technical and operational points of view, they did not provide the experience that was needed nor lead to the formulation of sound strategic concepts.

== Commemoration and re-evaluation ==
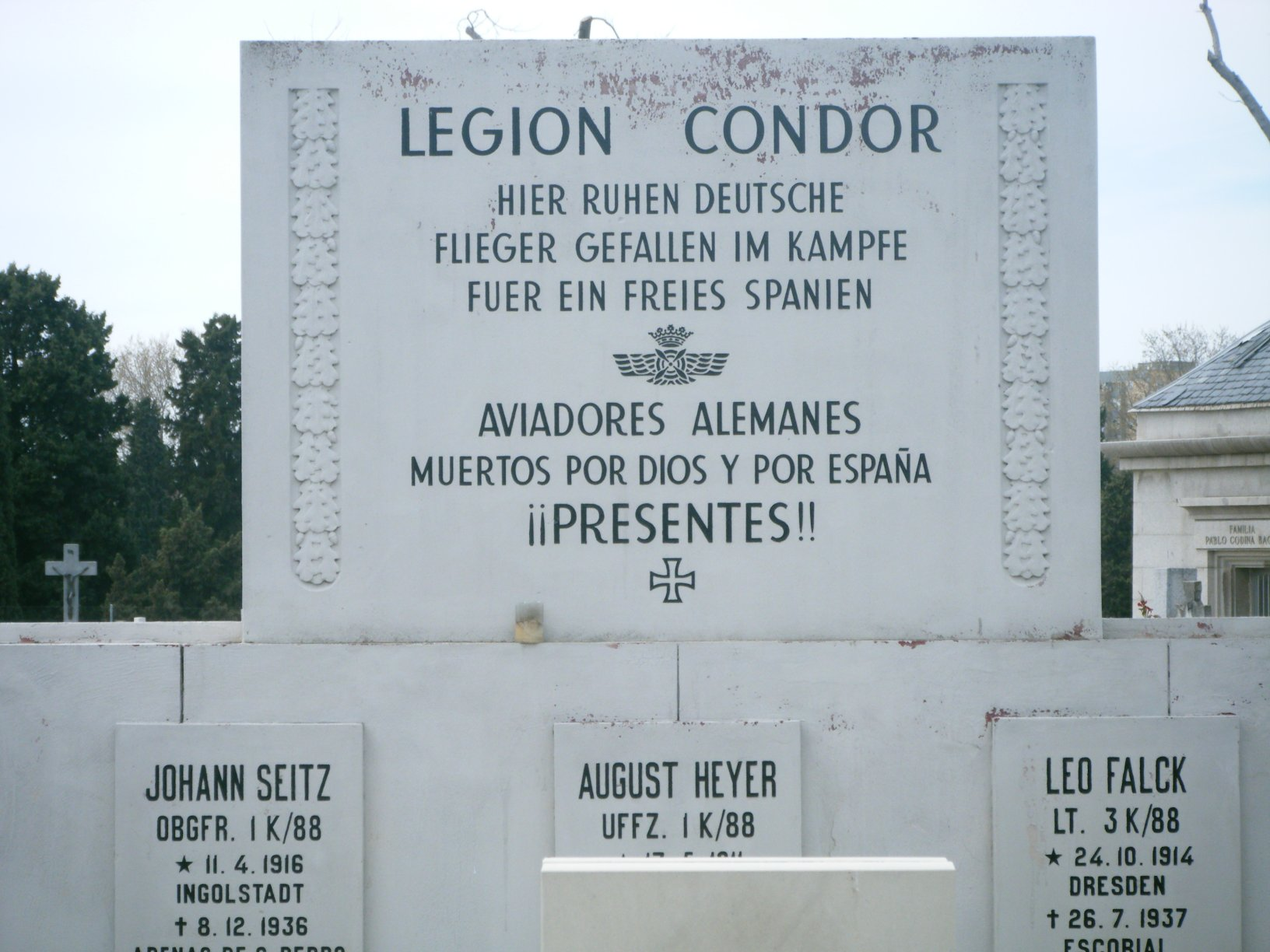
The Condor Legion memorial in Madrid's Cementerio de la Almudena, before the mausoleum was dismantled in 2017.

Shame about the activities of the Condor Legion and its involvement in the bombing of Guernica have re-surfaced in Germany since its 1990s reunification. In 1997, the 60th anniversary of Operation Rügen, German President Roman Herzog wrote an apology on behalf of the German people and state to survivors of the raid. Herzog said that he wanted to extend "a hand of friendship and reconciliation" on behalf of all German citizens. The sentiment was echoed by members of the German Parliament who, in 1998, legislated the removal of all former Legion members' names from German military bases. The issue surfaced again in 2005 after media reports about the role of pilot Werner Mölders, who had volunteered to serve in Spain. Although he was not involved in the bombing of Guernica, it was decided by German Defence Minister Peter Struck that Mölders' name would be removed from the barracks at Visselhoevede and from association with Luftwaffe Fighter Wing 74 (Jagdgeschwader 74) based in Neuburg an der Donau. Until then, it had not been established that Mölders had flown as a Condor Legion volunteer before his death in 1941.

On 26 April 2017, the 80th anniversary of the Guernica bombing, the Madrid City Council announced that it had dismantled the Condor Legion mausoleum at the Cementerio de la Almudena, which had been built in early 1942. The mausoleum's facade, removed at the request of the German embassy in Madrid, would be replaced with name plaques for the seven soldiers entombed there.

== Awards ==
The Spanish Cross (German: Spanienkreuz) campaign medal began to be awarded by the German authorities in seven classes on 14 April 1939. (Note: This campaign medal is not to be confused with the Spanish War Cross, which began to be awarded in 1942 for acts of gallantry on the Eastern Front to Spanish volunteers of the Blue Division.) The clandestine nature of German activities in Spain meant that no awards were made until April 1939, at the end of German involvement in the conflict. The Spanish Cross complemented the Condor Legion Tank Badge, which was approved on 10 July 1939, and cuff titles were issued. Legionnaires also received a campaign medal struck by the Spanish authorities to thank German volunteers for their service. An al Merito En Campaña medal was awarded to the legion as a whole, and added to its battle flag.

The legion assembled for an address by Hitler on 6 June 1939 and for a parade as part of the 20 April 1939 celebrations of Hitler's 50th birthday. (Note: Colour images of the address were taken by Hugo Jaeger, and are available via Getty images. The legion's return to Germany and parade were filmed by Ufa.) Its activities were commemorated in a special issue of Der Adler, the Luftwaffe's propaganda magazine, which was circulated in Spain and the United States.

== Ranks and insignia ==
Insignia		German Rank	Spanish equivalent
Chest	Cuff	German Rank	Spanish equivalent
—N/a		Generalleutnant	General de división
—N/a		Generalmajor	General de brigada
—N/a		Oberst	Coronel
	—N/a	Oberstleutnant	Coronel
	—N/a	Major	Teniente coronel
	—N/a	Hauptmann	Comandante
	—N/a	Oberleutnant	Capitán
	—N/a	Leutnant	Teniente
	—N/a	Feldwebel, Oberfeldwebel, Stabsfeldwebel	Alférez
	—N/a	Unteroffizier, Unterfeldwebel	Sargento
	—N/a	Legionär	Cabo

== Notable participants ==
- Oskar Dirlewanger
- Rudolf Demme, head trainer
- Adolf Galland
- Hajo Herrmann
- Hermann Höfle
- Werner Mölders
- Hugo Sperrle, commander
- Hannes Trautloft
- Heinrich Trettner
- Wolfram von Richthofen, commander
- Wilhelm Ritter von Thoma, commander

== See also ==
- Kampfgeschwader 53, nicknamed "Legion Condor"
- Fuerza Aérea Nacional (Arma de Aviación), the Spanish Nationalist air forces.
- Spanish Republican Air Force, supported primarily by the Soviet Union.
- Heinkel He 111 operational history#Spanish Civil War
- Hugo Jaeger, photographer
