= Heinkel He 111 operational history =

German WWII bomber history

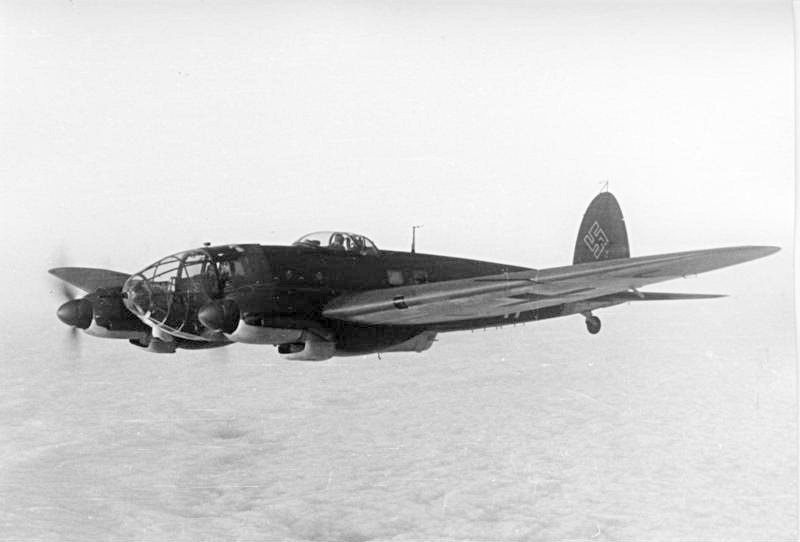
Heinkel He 111 H in flight

The Heinkel He 111 was one of the most numerous German bombers of the Second World War. Designed in the mid-1930s, the type persevered until 1945. In Spain, variants of the design saw service until 1973.

== Second Sino-Japanese War ==
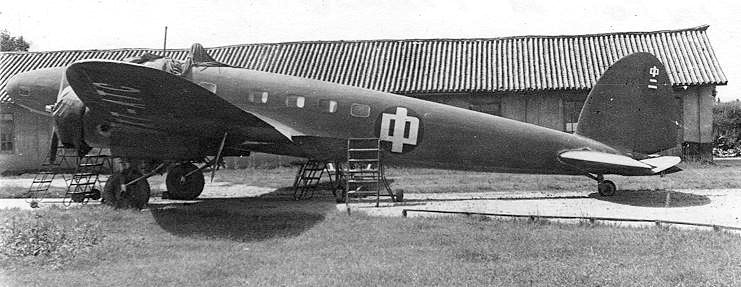
The Chinese He 111A

The first bomber version of the Heinkel He 111 to enter production was the He 111A-0, with a pre-production batch of 10 aircraft being ordered for service evaluation late in 1935. Performance of these aircraft, powered by two BMW VI engines, was disappointing, and the aircraft were rejected by the Luftwaffe. The government of the Chinese state of Canton was less picky and purchased six He 111A-0s, (also known as He 111Ks), taking delivery in mid-1936, the aircraft entering service with the Nationalist Chinese Air Force (which had taken over the Cantonese air force) in October–November 1936.

Chinese use of the He 111 in the Sino-Japanese War-WWII that began on 7 July 1937 with the Marco Polo Bridge Incident was limited, operational use being at first delayed by a lack of suitable bombs. On the Chinese Heinkels first operational mission, a raid by five He 111s and six Martin 139 against Japanese forces near Shanghai, the inexperienced crews left the retractable ventral "dustbin" turrets extended, so the Heinkels could not keep up with the Martin bombers and their escorting fighters, and three of the five aircraft were shot down by Japanese fighters. On 25 August 1937, five Chinese Nationalist Air Force bombers of the 8th BG, 19th and 30th Squadrons consisting of three Heinkel He 111As and two Martin B-10s (Martin 139) respectively, flying from their base in Nanjing to Shanghai, successfully dropped their bombs on Japanese landing forces at Liuhe, Taicang northwest of Shanghai, however Japanese fighters pursued the bombers and shot up two of the Heinkels, forcing them to crash land; two crew members were killed on the ground by Japanese aircraft strafing at them. One He 111 was taken out of storage in December 1943, fitted with Wright Cyclone radial engines and converted to a transport aircraft.

== Spanish Civil War ==
The initial bomber force of the Condor Legion, the German volunteer force supporting Franco's Nationalist forces in the Spanish Civil War, was composed of Junkers Ju 52/3m bomber/transport aircraft. These proved vulnerable to Soviet supplied Polikarpov I-15 and I-16 fighters, with the Germans suffering heavy losses, and on 6 January 1937 it was decided to send some of Germany's latest bombers to Spain, both to allow evaluation of the new aircraft in operational conditions and to allow effective use against the Republicans. Four He 111Bs, together with four Dornier Do 17s and four Junkers Ju 86s arrived in Spain in February 1937, equipping a Staffel of Kampfgruppe 88.

The Heinkels made their combat debut on 9 March 1937, when they attacked Republican held airfields in support of the Battle of Guadalajara. The Heinkel proved superior to the two other German medium bombers, being both faster and carrying a heavier bombload. Initial losses in combat were low, and more deliveries from Germany allowed full re-equipment of Kampfgruppe 88 with the Heinkel by October 1937. Further deliveries of the improved He 111E allowed some of the older He 111Bs to be passed to the Spanish Nationalists, who formed Grupo 10-G-25 in August 1938. In total, 94 Heinkels were delivered to the Condor Legion during the war. By the time the Spanish Civil War ended on 1 April 1939, 21 Heinkels had been lost to enemy action, with a further 15 lost in accidents and one destroyed by sabotage. The 58 remaining Heinkels were left behind and formed the backbone of the bombing force of the new Spanish State.

The 25 He 111B and 33 He 111Es were supplemented late in 1939 with three He 111Js, which were used to fly weather reconnaissance flights, with three H models later being received from Germany for the same role, and a fourth aircraft received as a pattern aircraft for planned licence production. As World War II intensified in Europe, the Spanish Air Force suffered from fuel shortages, while the supply of spare parts for the He 111E's Jumo engines dried up, which resulted in most of the He 111Es being grounded from February 1942, placing a greater burden on the underpowered He 111Bs. The problems with the Jumo engines were solved by February 1946, however, allowing the He 111Es to return to regular service.

While CASA 2.111s (licence-built He 111H-16s) started to enter service in early 1950, the German-built aircraft continued in use as bombers, as the CASA-built aircraft's Jumo 211F engines (which had been found in a depot in France in 1949) proved to be unreliable.The He 111Bs were phased out by 1952, with the He 111Es remaining in use as a bomber until 1956. Another use for the elderly Heinkels was as a multi-engined trainer, with the last two German-built Heinkels, a He 111E and a He 111H remaining in use until 1958, with the final flight carried out at the Multi-engined Aircraft School at Jerez de la Frontera on 28 November 1958.

Five CASA 2.111 bombers (Spanish-built variants of the Heinkel He-111), bombed enemy positions during the Ifni War, while an equal number of CASA 352 transports (Spanish-built versions of the Junkers Ju 52/3m) dropped a force of 75 paratroopers into the outpost.

== Second World War ==
=== Invasion of Poland and the Phoney war ===
Five He 111 Geschwader were committed to the German invasion of Poland. Kampfgeschwader 1 (KG 1), Kampfgeschwader 4 (KG 4), Kampfgeschwader 26 (KG 26), Kampfgeschwader 27 (KG 27) and Kampfgeschwader 53 (KG 53). All, with the exception of KG 4 were committed to Luftflotte 1 under the command of Generalfeldmarschall Albert Kesselring. KG 4 operated under Luftflotte 4. The He 111 provided medium-high altitude interdiction and ground support missions for the German Army. The He 111 participated in the Battle of the Bzura when the Polish Army Poznań and Army Pomorze were virtually destroyed by aerial assault. It also participated extensively in the Siege of Warsaw. During the campaign the Luftwaffe had anticipated that its bombers would be able to defend themselves adequately. PZL P.11s "for all their limited firepower and aerodynamic limitations, were capable of handing out severe punishment when able to engage the bombers without interference".

During the period of the phoney war the He 111 was tasked with strategic bombing attacks over the North Sea and naval bases in the United Kingdom as a means of attacking the Royal Navy. On 9 November 1939, Adolf Hitler issued directive No. 9 which emphasised the target with most importance as the British navy. Mindful of the damaging blockade that hurt the German war effort in the First World War, the directive selected British port storage depots with particular reference to oil and grain facilities, mining British sea lanes and direct attacks on British merchant shipping. In October 1939 several sorties had been made to bomb the Home Fleet at Scapa Flow and the Firth of Forth. HMS Hood was a particular target. Interceptions were made by RAF Supermarine Spitfire and Hawker Hurricane squadrons and suffered the odd losses. One significant incident took place on 22 February 1940. Kampfgeschwader 26 were ordered to attack fishing boats in the Dogger Bank region. The Kriegsmarine suspected they were being used as early warning vessels to report German warship movements in the North Sea, who at this time had made sorties to sink Allied merchant shipping. At the same time a German naval flotilla 1. Zerstörerflottille was sent into the area to disrupt Allied shipping. Lying between the German ships and the open sea was a massive minefield to prevent the Royal Navy from reaching the Heligoland Bight. Within the field lay a 6-mile (10-km) gap for the Germans to slip through. The liaison between the Kriegsmarine and Luftwaffe broke down. KG 26 had not been told of the German destroyers' presence. Attacking from 1,500 m (4,900 ft) the He 111s sank the Leberecht Maas and the Max Schultz, with the loss of 600 German sailors.

=== Invasion of Norway ===
The Heinkel formed the backbone of the Kampfwaffe in Operation Weserübung, the invasions of Denmark and Norway. KG 4, KG26 and KGr 100 were committed. The occupation of Denmark took less than 24 hours with minimal casualties and no aerial losses. The He 111s first task along with the Luftwaffe in general was to offset British Naval superiority in the North Sea. He 111s of KG 26 were to support the German Naval Task Force, composed of the heavy cruisers Blücher and Lützow, light cruiser Emden, three E-Boats and eight minesweepers with 2,000 men to Oslo. KG 26 were unable to prevent the sinking of Blücher at the Battle of Drøbak Sound by the Oscarsborg Fortress. KG 26 focused on Drøbak since the other strong points were taken. Showered with SC 250 250 kg (550 lb) bombs, the Norwegians capitulated. Heinkel He 111s of KG 26 helped Junkers Ju 88s of KG 30 damage the battleship HMS Rodney and sink the destroyer HMS Gurkha on 9 April. With most of the country secure the He 111s participated in the Battles of Narvik and anti-shipping missions against Allied reinforcements being brought to Norway by sea in May–June 1940.

=== Invasion of France and the Low Countries ===
The French Campaign opened on 10 May 1940. The He 111 Geschwader encountered scattered and uncoordinated Allied fighter resistance over the Netherlands and Belgium. On 14 May 1940, He 111s of KG 54 undertook the Rotterdam Blitz in which large portions of the city were destroyed after the 111s had dropped some 91 tonnes (100 tons) of bombs. The Dutch surrendered early the following morning, ending the Battle of the Netherlands. Most units suffered light to moderate losses in the early stages. The exception was KG 27, which suffered the heaviest losses of the He 111 Geschwader over the French sectors. By the end of the first day, seven He 111s were missing, two were written off and five damaged. The He 111s supported the dash to the English Channel and helped defeat the French forces at Sedan, the Allied counter-offensive at the Battle of Arras and assisted German siege forces during the Battle of Dunkirk. During the Sedan breakthrough, 3,940 sorties were flown against French positions by German bomber formations, the bulk of which were equipped with the He 111. The result was a French collapse that made the pincer move of Fall Gelb possible. The He 111 – with its heavier bomb load – was also tasked with the destruction of the French rail network in the Reims and Amiens regions. Their attacks were instrumental in preventing French reinforcements and retreats. Any French counter against the German forces left flank was impossible as a result. With the conclusion of Fall Gelb the He 111 units prepared for Fall Rot. Some 600 He 111s and Do 17s took part in Operation Paula which was aimed at the final destruction of French air power in and around Paris. The resulting combats and bombing failed to destroy what remained of the Armée de l'Air. From that point He 111 losses were light, with occasional exceptions. The He 111 had performed well, though losses were substantially higher than in any campaign before it. This was mainly due to its light defensive armament. This would be exposed during the Battle of Britain, the first major test of the He 111s poor defensive armament.

=== Battle of Britain ===
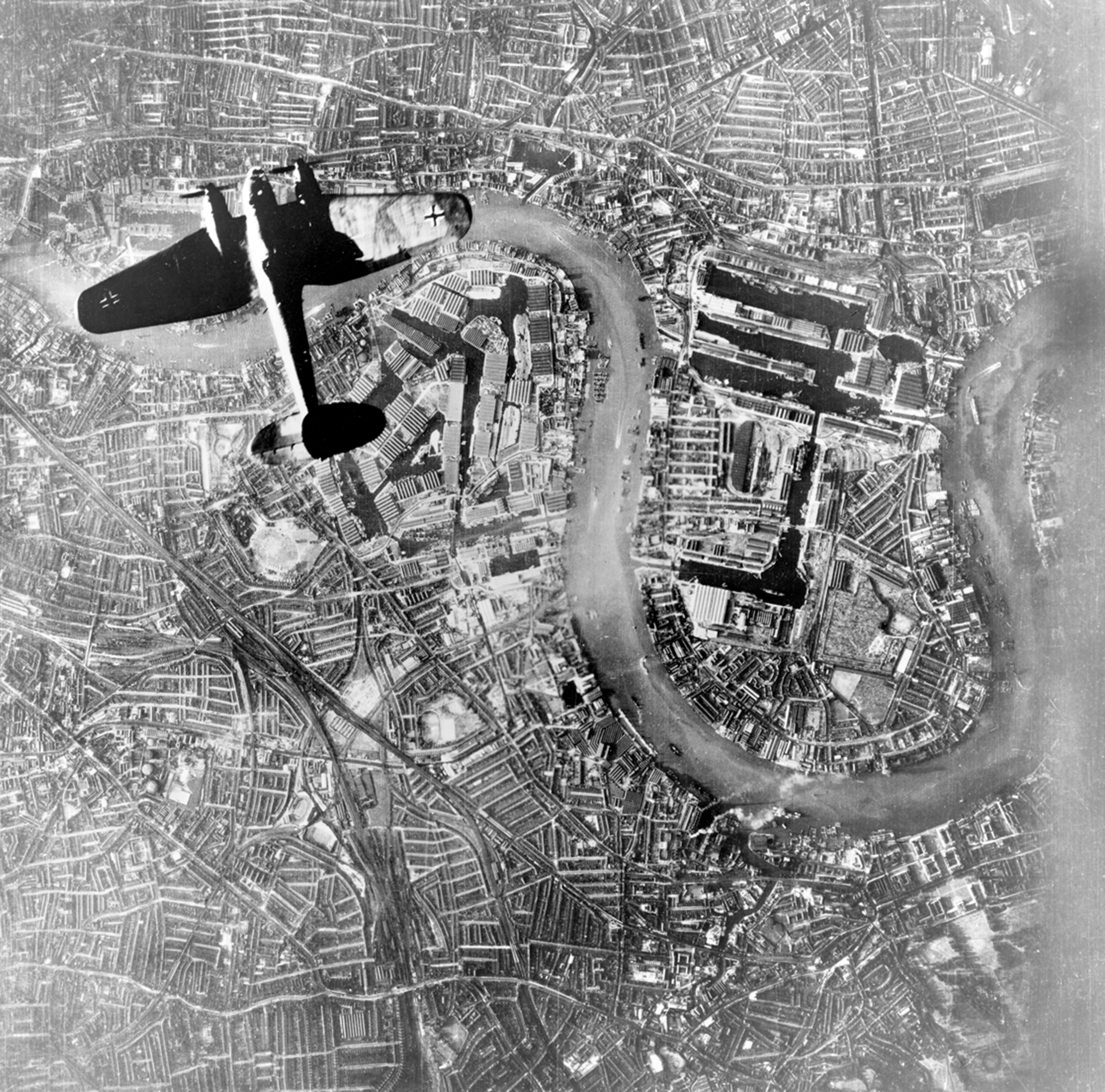
Heinkel He 111 bomber over Wapping and the Isle of Dogs in the East End of London on 7 September 1940

Luftflotte 2 and Luftflotte 3 committed 34 Gruppen to the campaign over Britain. Fifteen of them were equipped with the He 111. The remainder were mixed Do 17 and Ju 88 units. The He 111 and Ju 88 were equal in performance in all but speed, in which the Ju 88 was faster. The Do 17 was also faster, but lacked the heavy bomb load capabilities of the Ju 88 and He 111. During the Battle of Britain the Heinkel's ability to take heavy punishment was one of its strengths and it suffered fewer losses than the Ju 88. The battle highlighted the need for heavier defensive armament and effective fighter protection by the Messerschmitt Bf 109 and Messerschmitt Bf 110 units if losses were to be kept to sustainable levels. The concentration of most of the crew in the glass nose made the He 111 vulnerable to concentrated fire from a head-on attack.

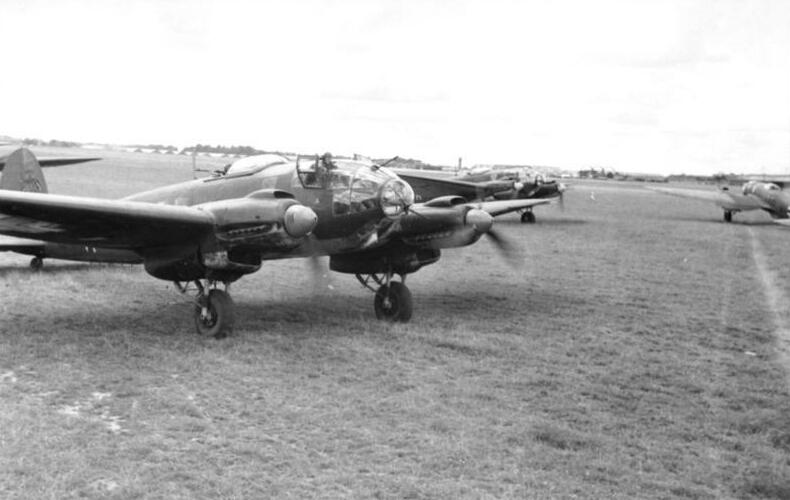
A frontal shot of a He 111H, summer 1940. The cockpit design gave the crew excellent vision but was vulnerable to attack from a head-on position

The advantages won in July and August were lost by the switch of strategy to bombing British cities and industrial centres, known as the Blitz, on 7 September 1940. The He 111 was now being asked to perform in the role of the strategic bomber. Despite the fact that it lacked the load-carrying capacity of later heavy bombers, the He 111 still carried enough destructive power to cause severe damage to strategic targets; the de Havilland Mosquito factory near Bristol was devastated by Kampfgeschwader 53 on 30 August. A month later, the Woolston Supermarine Spitfire factory was destroyed largely by He 111s of Kampfgeschwader 55 on 26 September, forcing the factory's closure and dispersal, though the disruption to production was, at that time, not as serious as it would have been in July/August 1940.

He 111s were fitted with the Knickebein and used it for blind-bombing during the Blitz, leading to the Battle of the Beams. This system, fitted to all German bombers, enabled the He 111 to bomb targets during the night without visual contact. Some special Pfadfinder (Pathfinder) units such as Kampfgruppe 100 were equipped with the X-Gerät blind-bombing system and were used to illuminate targets with incendiary bombs for the regular bomber units that followed. Theoretically, it could hit individual buildings, though in practice jamming and other factors tended to decrease its accuracy. Eventually, the Y-Gerät was introduced, as an enhanced version of the previous X-system. On 3 November 1940 the RAF had a chance to evaluate a He 111 that had landed along the coast and was partially submerged with the equipment. A Royal Navy captain who arrived claimed command of the salvage operation as he was a superior rank to the attending Army Officer and insisted the He 111 be towed to deeper water before hoisting it up. The ropes snapped and the He 111 sank. Though the machine was eventually pulled out, the salt water had got into its Gerät system.

The Luftwaffe tried to attack industrial, transport and civilian targets simultaneously but failed to do so. Even so, the He 111 contributed to the Birmingham Blitz, Bristol Blitz, Barrow Blitz, Coventry Blitz, Liverpool Blitz, Plymouth Blitz and Southampton Blitz which caused severe damage. Some of these targets were obscured by cloud, but the equipped X-Gerät Heinkels inflicted heavy damage. However the British countered its use with decoy sites to attract the attention of bombers and the "Meacon" system, which disrupted Luftwaffe beacon transmissions.

242 He 111s were destroyed during the course of the battle between July and October 1940, a total substantially lower than the 303 Ju 88s destroyed. The Dornier Do 17s losses in the Battle of Britain amounted to 132 machines destroyed, the lowest losses of the three German bomber types.

=== Invasion of the Balkans ===
The campaign against Yugoslavia and Greece lasted only three weeks, but the He 111 played a key role in it. On 6 April 1941 He 111s attached to Luftflotte 4 participated in the Bombing of Belgrade. After the brief advance and conquest of Greece the He 111 also supported Axis forces in the Battle of Crete, sustaining light losses. During this period it also participated in the Siege of Malta and conducted bombing raids against Egypt and the Suez Canal. Kampfgeschwader 4 delivered the lion's share of the raids in May–June 1941 against coastal targets including Alexandria and suffered the loss of six aircraft and five crews.

=== Torpedo bomber operations ===
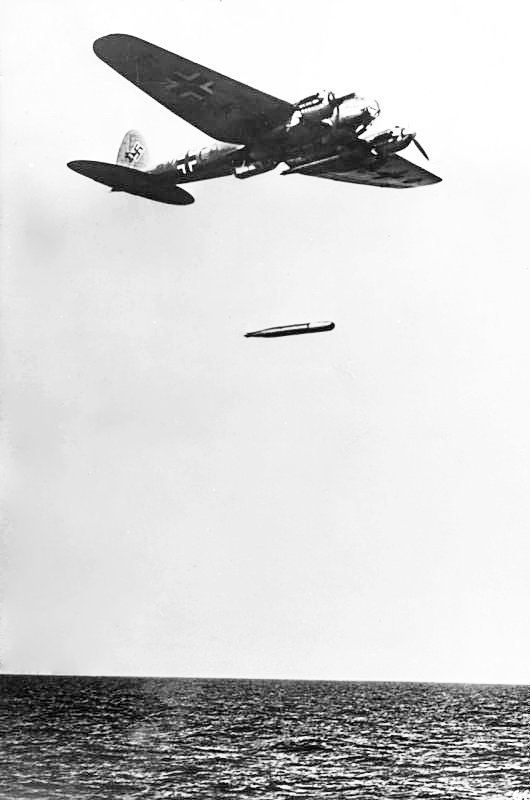
He 111H on a torpedo training exercise, 10 October 1941

The He 111 also served as a torpedo bomber in the Battle of the Atlantic and the Mediterranean Sea. In the Atlantic campaign the Luftwaffe created Fliegerführer Atlantik for this purpose. In the spring 1941, the Luftwaffe had been using conventional bombs to attack shipping more often than not. Such a method resulted in heavy losses to He 111 units in aircraft and crew as the 111s attack point was too close. III./Kampfgeschwader 40 had only eight of 32 crews remaining by April 1941 and had to be withdrawn. Most He 111 units were replaced by the faster Junkers Ju 88 and Dornier Do 217 which also suffered losses, but not to the extent of the He 111.

A proper aerial torpedo could have prevented such losses. The German Navy had purchased Horton naval torpedo patents from Norway in 1933 and the Whitehead Fiume patent from Italy in 1938. But air-launched torpedo development was slow. In 1939 trials with Heinkel He 59 and Heinkel He 115 had revealed a 49 percent failure rate owing to aerodynamic difficulties and depth control and fusing difficulties. Until 1941 the Luftwaffe obtained poor results in this field. When in 1941 the Luftwaffe took an active interest, the Kriegsmarine resisted Luftwaffe involvement and collaboration and direct requests by the Luftwaffe to take over development was refused.

With the Atlantic campaign in full swing, the Luftwaffe needed a torpedo bomber to allow its aircraft to avoid increased shipboard anti-aircraft armament. It set up a number of schools devoted to torpedo attack at Gossenbrode, Germany and Athens, Greece. It was found that the He 111 was highly suited to such operations. In December 1941 the Luftwaffe was granted the lead in torpedo development. Trials at Grossenbrode enabled the He 111 to carry two torpedoes, while the Ju 88 could also manage the same number and remain faster in flight. KG 26 was equipped with both the He 111 and Ju 88. Some 42 He 111s served with I./KG 26 flying out of Norway.

The He 111's ordnance was the Italian Whitehead Fiume 850 kg (1,870 lb) torpedo and the German F5b 1528 kg (3369 lb) light torpedo. Both functioned over a distance of 3 km (1.9 mi) at a speed of 40 km/h (25 mph) The Whitehead armament weighed over 200 kg (440 lb). To make an attack the He 111 pilot had to drop to 40 m (130 ft) and reduce air speed to 190 km/h (120 mph). The water depth had to a minimum of 15 m (49 ft). (Note: In comparison to the Italian and German-designed ordnance, the Imperial Japanese Navy's Type 91 torpedo — the 838 kg-weight (1,848 lb) air-deployed ordnance which had proved so devastating to the U.S. Navy's warships during the Attack on Pearl Harbor — which, in its Revision 2 version, would end up being considered for German production as the Luftorpedo LT 850, after its plans were taken to Germany nine months later by IJN submarine I-30 on August 2, 1942.)

The He 111 was committed to operations in the Arctic Ocean against the Arctic convoys traveling to the Soviet Union from North America and the United Kingdom. One notable action involved I./KG 26 attacking Convoy PQ 17 in June 1942. I./KG 26 and its He 111s sank three ships and damaged three more. Later, III./KG 26 helped Ju 88s of III./KG 30 based at Banak sink several more ships. Some 25 out of 35 merchant ships were sunk altogether. Convoy PQ 16 was also intercepted by KG 26, who claimed four vessels, but lost six crews in return. Convoy PQ 18 was also intercepted during 13 15 September 1942. In total some 13 out of 40 ships were sunk. It cost the Luftwaffe 40 aircraft, of which 20 were KG 26 He 111s. Of the 20 crews, 14 were missing.

He 111 torpedo units continued to operate with success elsewhere. Anti-shipping operations in the Black Sea against the Soviet Navy were also carried out. The Soviets mainly sailed at night and singly, making interception very difficult. The Soviets also protected their shipping at sea and in port. Anti-aircraft defensive fire was severe in daylight and at night was supported by searchlights, though these measures did not stop the He 111 completely. The Geschwader continued to press home their attacks with some success. On the morning of 7 November 1941, an He 111 of KG 28 sank the Soviet hospital ship Armenia off the coast of Crimea, killing at least 5,000 people.

In the Mediterranean theatre the Allies had won air superiority by 1943 but the torpedo Geschwader, KG 26, continued to operate He 111s in shipping attack units. The He 111s attacked Allied shipping along the African coast flying from bases in Sicily and Sardinia both in daylight and darkness. In spite of night fighters and anti-aircraft defences the He 111s continued to get through to their targets. Losses meant a gradual decline in experienced crews and standards of attack. Such missions were largely abandoned in the spring owing to shortages in aircraft and crews. By April, KG 26 could only scrape together some 13 Ju 88 and He 111 torpedo bombers. With the exception of I./KG 26 all other groups converted to the Ju 88.

=== Middle East, North Africa and the Mediterranean ===
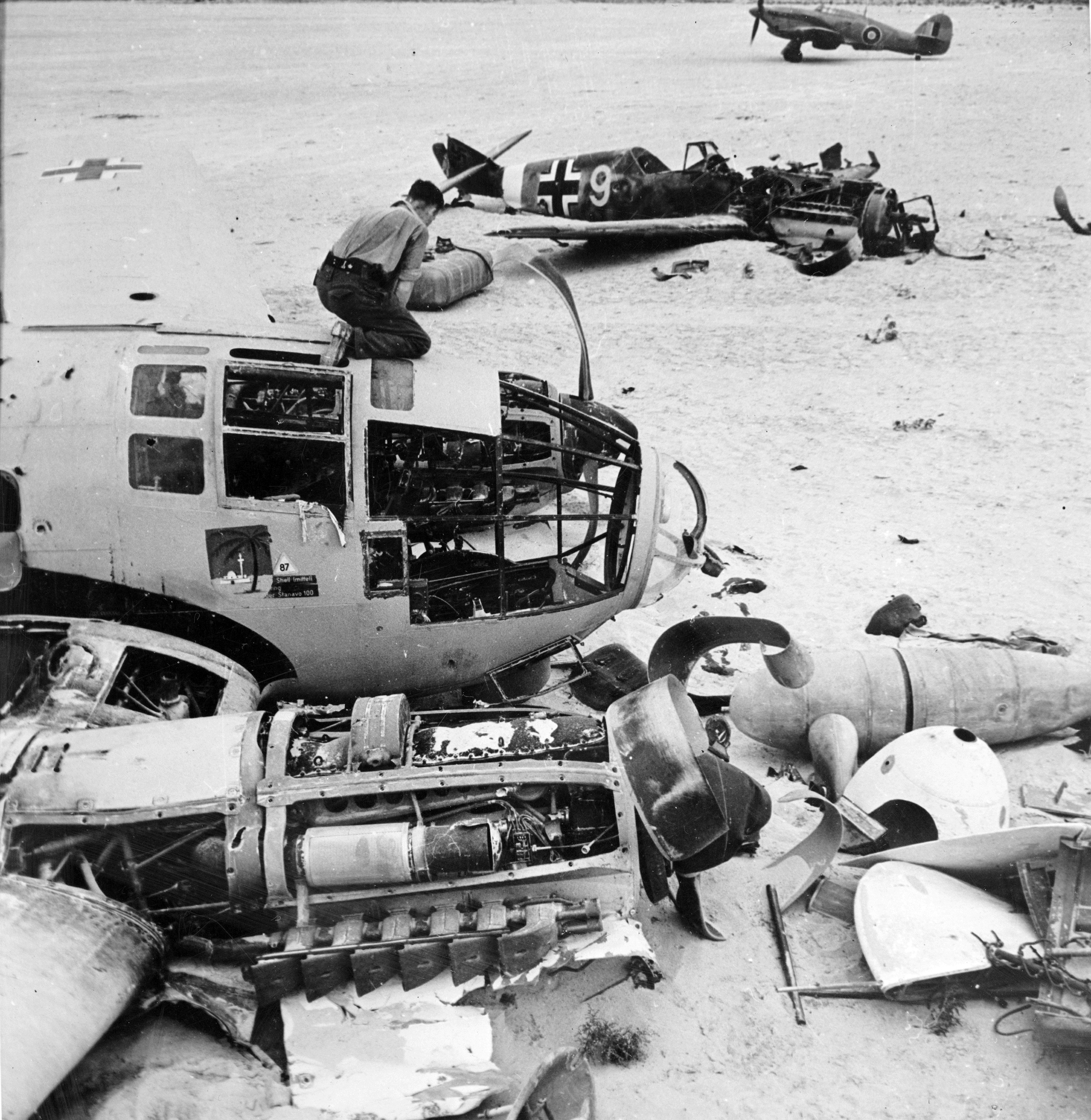
A He 111 wreck in North Africa, 1942

The Rashid Ali Rebellion and resulting Anglo-Iraqi War saw the Luftwaffe commit 4.staffel.II./KG 4 He 111s to the Iraqi Nationalists cause under "Flyer Command Iraq" (Fliegerführer Irak). Painted in Iraqi markings their stay was very brief. Due to the Iraqi collapse the Staffel was withdrawn on 31 May 1941, just 17 days after its arrival. The record of the He 111 fleet at the time of its departure between the 15 and 29 May indicated it had participated in seven armed reconnaissance flights and five bombing missions against Habbaniya which involved 20 crews and the dropping of 10 tons of bombs.

The Italian failures during the initial period of the North African Campaign forced the Wehrmacht to reinforce the Axis forces in North Africa which led to a 28-month aerial campaign. The He 111 along with the Ju 88 took on deep offensive bombing operations from the very beginning. In January 1941 a number of Kampfgeschwaders carried out raids against the Royal Navy and Allied convoys. KG 26 was the first unit to be used in this capacity. Some of the early raids were costly despite the lack opposition. On night of 17/18 January 12 of KG 26s machines set out to bomb Benghazi, seven of eight were lost after running out of fuel. Successes were frequent and the minesweeper HMS Huntley and the freighter Sollum were sunk. A number of He 111 units, mostly KG 26, also supported the German invasion of Crete. During the Balkans conflict and following attack on the Soviet Union, most of the bomber operations in the theatre fell to the Ju 88 and Junkers Ju 87 equipped units. The He 111s returned during the winter of 1941/42 during the stalemate on the Soviet–German front.

Throughout 1941–1942, the small numbers of He 111s assisted in the attempt to starve Malta into surrender. With most of RAF Fighter Command concentrated on the Channel Front, the He 111s and the Luftwaffe came close to achieving this by gradually strangling the sea supply routes and forcing a partial collapse of British sea power in the central Mediterranean Sea. The Allied forces on Malta were considering surrender as late as November 1942. It was not until later that month the attacks ceased and the siege was lifted.

=== Soviet–German war, 1941–1945 ===
On 22 June 1941 Adolf Hitler initiated Operation Barbarossa, the German invasion of the Soviet Union. The Heinkel order of battle on this date amounted to three Kampfgeschwader. KG 53, committed to Luftflotte 2 attached to Army Group North. KG 27 was committed Luftflotte 4's Army Group Centre and KG 55, allocated to V. Fliegerkorps. As in the previous campaigns the He 111 were to provide tactical support to the German Army. Little thought was given to strategic bombing. It was thought that such an undertaking would not be required until the conquest of the European part of the Soviet Union west of a line connecting the cities of Arkhangelsk and Astrakhan, often referred to as the A–A line. During 1941–1942 the tactical use of the He 111 was limited owing to its limited manoeuvrability and bulky airframe. The He 111 was switched to the job of "train busting". The only specialised German ground attack aircraft was the Junkers Ju 87 Stuka and Henschel Hs 123, but both lacked the necessary range. The only recourse was to "employ" the He 111, along with the Ju 88. Some units had success, for example KG 55 destroyed or damaged 122 train loads, along with claims of 64 locomotives. The Soviets set up countermeasures in the form of heavy concentrations of anti-aircraft artillery which caused losses to increase, particularly in inexperienced crews. KG 55's special train busting staffel (Eis)./KG 55 suffered some 10 percent losses. During the winter battles of 1941, the He 111 reverted to a transport aircraft. The He 111 helped evacuate 21,000 soldiers from the Demyansk pocket, while transporting some 24,300 tons of food and ammunition. The He 111 proved invaluable in the "battle of the pockets".

Later, in 1942, the He 111 participated in the Battle of Stalingrad. During the Soviet Operation Uranus, which encircled the German Sixth Army, the He 111 fleet once again was asked to fly in supplies. The operation failed and the Sixth Army was destroyed. Some 165 He 111s were lost to heavily entrenched Soviet defences around the city during the siege.

The He 111 operated in the same capacity as in previous campaigns on the Eastern Front. The bomber was asked to perform strategic bombing functions. Targeting Soviet industry had not been high on the OKL's agenda in 1941–42, but prior to the Battle of Kursk several attempts were made to destroy Soviet military production. The tank factory at Gorkovskiy Avtomobilniy Zavod (GAZ) was subjected to a series of heavy attacks throughout June 1943. On the night of 4/5 June, He 111s of Kampfgeschwader 1, KG 3, KG 4, KG 55 and KG 100 dropped 161 tonnes (179 tons) of bombs, causing massive destruction to buildings and production lines. All of GAZ No. 1 plant's 50 buildings, 9,000 m (29,500 ft) of conveyors, 5,900 pieces of equipment and 8,000 tank engines were destroyed. However, the Germans made an error in target selection. The GAZ plant No. 1 produced only the T-70 light tank. Factory No. 112, the second-biggest producer of the more formidable T-34, continued production undisturbed. Soviet production facilities were repaired or rebuilt within six weeks. In 1943, Factory No. 112 produced 2,851 T-34s, 3,619 in 1944, and 3,255 in 1945. The Luftwaffe had also failed to hit the Gorkiy Artillery Factory (No. 92) or the aircraft plant where the Lavochkin La-5 and La 5FN were made. The Luftwaffe failed to disrupt the Soviet preparation for the coming battle, but the He 111 had proved capable of operating in a strategic role.

The He 111 also formed the core of the strategic bombing offensive later in the year. During the Soviet Lower Dnieper Offensive He 111 Geschwader performed strike missions. Reichsmarschall Hermann Göring issued an order to General Rudolf Meister's IV. Fliegerkorps on 14 October 1943:

I intend to initiate systematic attacks against the Russian arms industry by deploying the bulk of the heavy bomber units [mostly equipped with medium bombers] – reinforced by special units – which will be brought together under the command of IV. Fliegerkorps. The task will be to deal destructive strikes against the Russian arms industry in order to wipe out masses of Russian tanks, artillery pieces and aircraft before they reach the front, thus providing the hard-pressed Ostheer [East Army] with relief which will be much greater than if these bombers were deployed on the battlefield.

Soviet fighter opposition had made strategic bombing in daylight too costly and so German bombers crews were retrained in the winter of 1943/44 to fly night operations. The offensive began on the night of the 27/28 March 1944, with some 180 to 190 He 111s taking part and dropping an average of 200 tons of bombs. On the night of 30 April/1 May 1944, 252 sorties were flown, the highest number during the offensive. The targets were mainly Soviet marshalling yards in the western and eastern Ukraine.

Later in the summer, 1944, the He 111 once again operated with success as part of the shrinking German bomber force. German industry began to move factories eastward, out of the range of RAF Bomber Command and United States Army Air Forces attacks. In response, the USAAF started shuttle missions to the Soviet Union in which they would continue on and land in the USSR after their mission. The USAAF would then repeat the mission and continue to England. IV. Fliegerkorps was ordered to target the airfields of the USAAF bombers. On 21 June 1944, the US Eighth Air Force's B-17 Flying Fortresses landed at Mirgorod and Poltava airfields after bombing targets in Debrecen, Hungary. The Soviets had not prepared proper anti-aircraft defences and IV. Fliegerkorps and its He 111s from KG 4, KG 53 and KG 55 dropped 91 tonnes (100 tons) of bombs destroying 44 B-17s and 15 US fighters. The He 111s flew at altitudes of 4,000–5,000 m (13,120–16,400 ft), and not a single German aircraft was hit by enemy fire. Such missions were halted thereafter. The suspending of the "shuttle missions" (known as Operation Frantic) was assessed by the Germans as a result of the Soviet failure to provide appropriate protection. It is likely, however, that the B-17 and P-51's, which now had the range to strike anywhere in Europe, and had bases that could reach Eastern Europe in Italy, did not fly shuttle missions to the Soviet Union owing to these reasons.

=== Late war operations ===
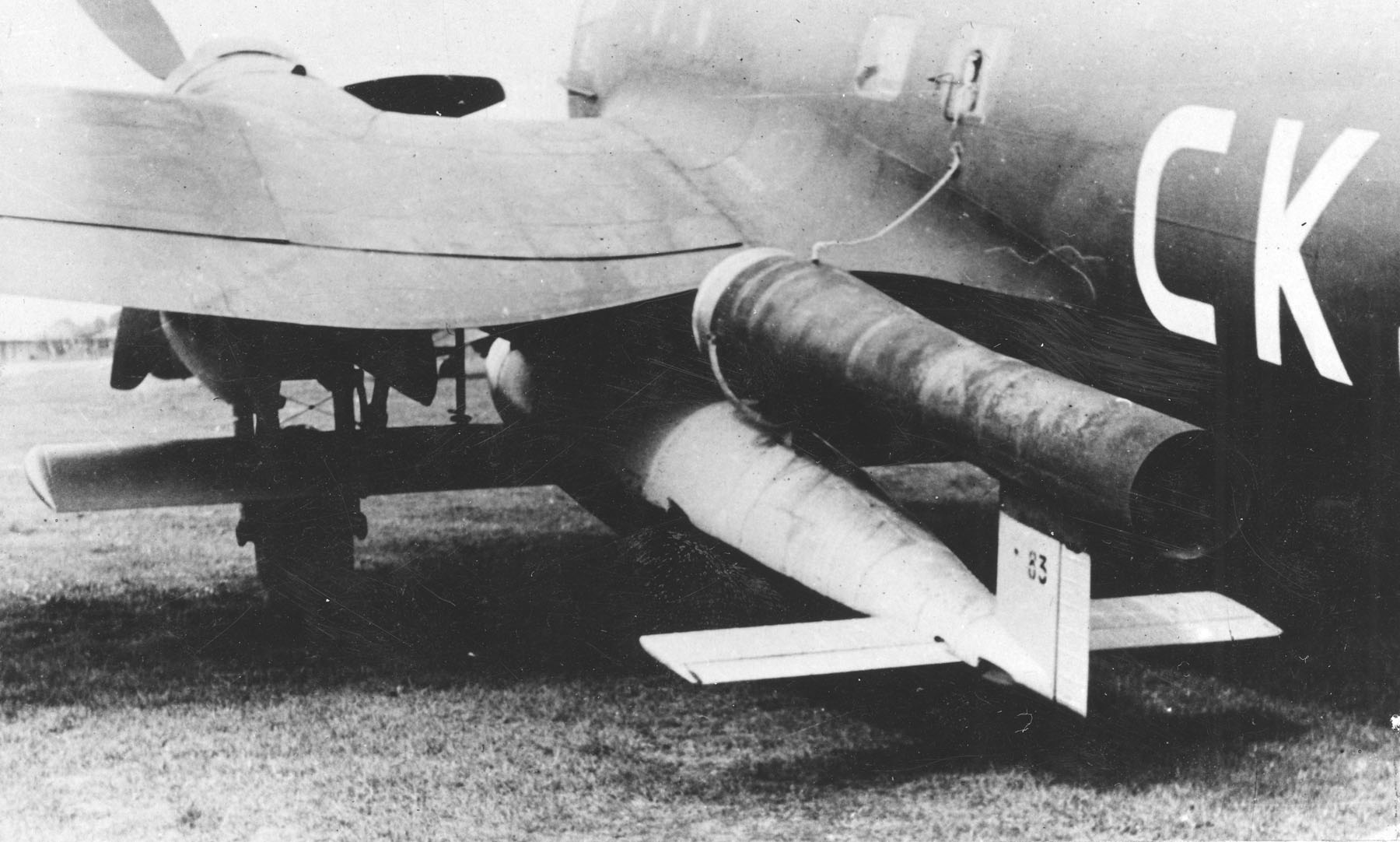
A German Luftwaffe Heinkel He 111 H-22. This version could carry FZG 76 (V1) flying bombs, but only a few aircraft were produced in 1944. Some were used by bomb wing KG 3..

By the spring, 1943, the numbers of He 111s in operational combat units was declining. The introduction of more powerful bombers, mostly the Junkers Ju 88, but also the Dornier Do 217 (as a rival anti-shipping attack aircraft) forced the He 111 out of service. Luftwaffe offensive operations were largely halted after late 1943 owing to Allied air superiority. Nevertheless, the anti-shipping missions continued against the Soviet Navy in the Black Sea. The late model He 111 H-16s in particular were fitted with FuG 200 Hohentwiel anti-shipping radar (German language). The armament of the FuG 200 equipped He 111s consisted of several difference types of Anti-ship missiles. The Henschel Hs 293 L-10 Friedensengel, a glider-mounted torpedo and the Blohm & Voss Bv 143 and Blohm & Voss BV 246 rocket-assisted glide bombs. Only the Hs 293s reached the operational stage. The Hs 293 was controlled by the FuG 203b Kehl III guidance control box. After the bomb was released, and the rocket fuelled power unit ignited, the rocket cleared the aircraft and was then in sight of the bomb aimer. The aimer controlled the lever of the FuG 203 to adjust the angle of the missile's control surfaces. Flares were attached to the missiles to allow the crew to track the direction of the missile until impact.

Other variants such as the He 111H-16/R3 and H-20/R2 pathfinders carried V-1 flying bombs to their targets in London as part of Adolf Hitler's "vengeance" campaign. The V-1s had been launched from northern France and the German occupied Netherlands, but of the 2,000 launched some 50 percent had reached London, of which 661 were shot down. The He 111H-21 and H-22 were asked to deliver the V-1s when the British and Canadian 21st Army Group liberated the Netherlands and overran the landing sites. Some of the H-22s were loaded with Fieseler Fi 103R (Reichenberg) missiles. The conditions of late 1944 differed greatly from the "Blitz" of 1940–41. RAF nightfighters carried the AI Mk IV metric wavelength radar and the high performance of types like the de Havilland Mosquito ensured German bomber crews had to stay low to the surface of the sea to avoid early detection, while flying the North Sea route to the British coast. Flying at low-level for long periods carried heavy risk of collision with a rising wave. In order to have any chance of surviving, crews were forced to wear bulky immersion suits and inflatable life vests that made the average flight, of three to five hours, very uncomfortable.

The raids usually started from the radio beacon at Den Helder, the Netherlands. When the release point was reached, the pilot would climb to 1,600 ft (500m) and release the payload before retreating back to low altitude. The return journey was just as dangerous at that time. Mosquito units operating over the Netherlands and continent posed a threat to He 111s as they sought to land. In late 1944 and 1945, the He 111 reverted to a transport role. It helped evacuate Axis forces from Greece and Yugoslavia in October–November 1944. He 111 units also transported men and material out of Budapest, during the siege of the city, while He 111s of Kampfgeschwader 4 assaulted Soviet bridgeheads and laid mines in the Danube to hamper the Red Army from crossing the river. The remaining He 111s withdrew from the Hungarian front after the siege ended in February 1945 to concentrate on destroying the bridges over the Oder river as the Soviet advance was nearing Berlin.

Professor Heinkel said of the He 111s performance during the war:

They became reliable, proven and easily maintained worker-bees for the Luftwaffe bomber units. Even though, after 1941, they had been technically superseded and, above all were hampered by their lack of range..and, despite repeated modifications, could not be given the additional range required-there was really no substitute for them.
