= André Zucca =

Nazi-collaborating French photographer (1897–1973)

- Born: 1897; Paris, France
- Died: 1973 (aged 75 or 76); Montmartre, Paris, France
- Occupation: Photography
- Years active: 1935-1973
- Children: Pierre Zucca

André Zucca (1897–1973) was a French photographer and Nazi collaborator, most well known for his work with the German propaganda magazine Signal.

== Biography ==
André Zucca was born in 1897 in Paris, the son of an Italian dressmaker. Zucca spent part of his youth in the United States before returning to France in 1915. Following the outbreak of World War I, he joined the French Army where he was wounded and decorated with the Croix de Guerre. After the war, he began a career as a photographer.

After several foreign reports from 1935 to 1937 (Italy, Greece, Yugoslavia, Japan, China, India, Morocco) alongside fellow journalist Joseph Kessel, he began work for several news publications, including L'Illustration, Paris-Soir, and Match. From September 1939 until the Fall of France in June 1940, he covered the Phony War in the press.

In 1941, he was contracted by the occupying Germans to work as a photographer and correspondent for the magazine Signal, a propaganda organ of the German Wehrmacht. His photography was used to support a positive image of the German occupation in France, as well as to encourage French men to volunteer for the Legion of French Volunteers Against Bolshevism, a collaborationist French militia serving on the Eastern Front. It is disputed whether or not Zucca's work for the Germans was linked to any ideological sympathies with Nazism, and some have argued he was a right-wing anarchist. In addition to his contributions to Signal, he was one of the few photographers in occupied-Europe with access to Agfacolor film, a rare and expensive piece of color film at the time, thanks to his close relationship with the Germans. He is most well known today for his color photographs of daily life in Paris under German occupation.

His son Pierre Zucca, a film director, was born in 1943.

Following the liberation, he was placed on trial in October 1944 by the French Provisional Government in the épuration légale (legal purge), where his journalistic privileges were permanently revoked. The court ruled that no further legal action should be taken against Zucca, largely thanks to the credentials of a resistance member who spoke out on his behalf. With his journalism career in shambles, Zucca assumed the name André Piernic and settled in the French commune of Dreux, where he opened a small photo boutique, taking wedding and communion photos. He died in 1973.

His photo collections were purchased by the Bibliothèque historique de la ville de Paris in 1986, consisting primarily of his photos of occupied Paris taken during World War II. In 2008, Éditions Gallimard, a major French publishing house, worked with the city of Paris to organize an exhibition of Zucca's wartime photographs. The exhibition attracted a great deal of controversy for its portrayal of a seemingly-carefree, wartime Paris.
