= Agfacolor =

Trademark for a series of color film products

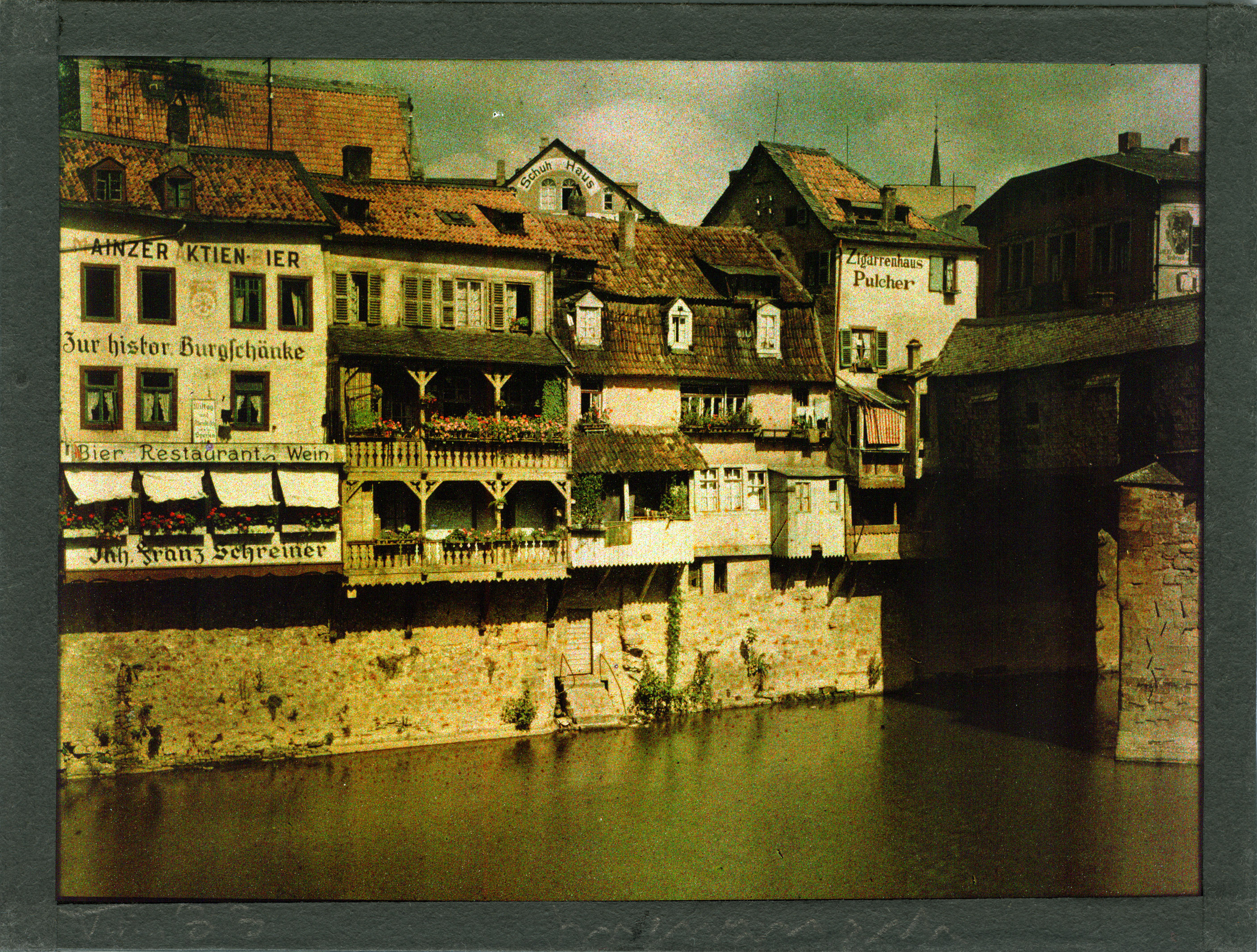
Agfa-Farbenplatte of Bad Kreuznach, Germany, 1933.

Agfacolor was a series of color film products made by Agfa of Germany. The first Agfacolor, introduced in 1932, was a film-based version of their Agfa-Farbenplatte (Agfa color plate), a "screen plate" product similar to the French Autochrome. In late 1936, Agfa introduced Agfacolor Neu (New Agfacolor), a pioneering color film of the general type still in use today.

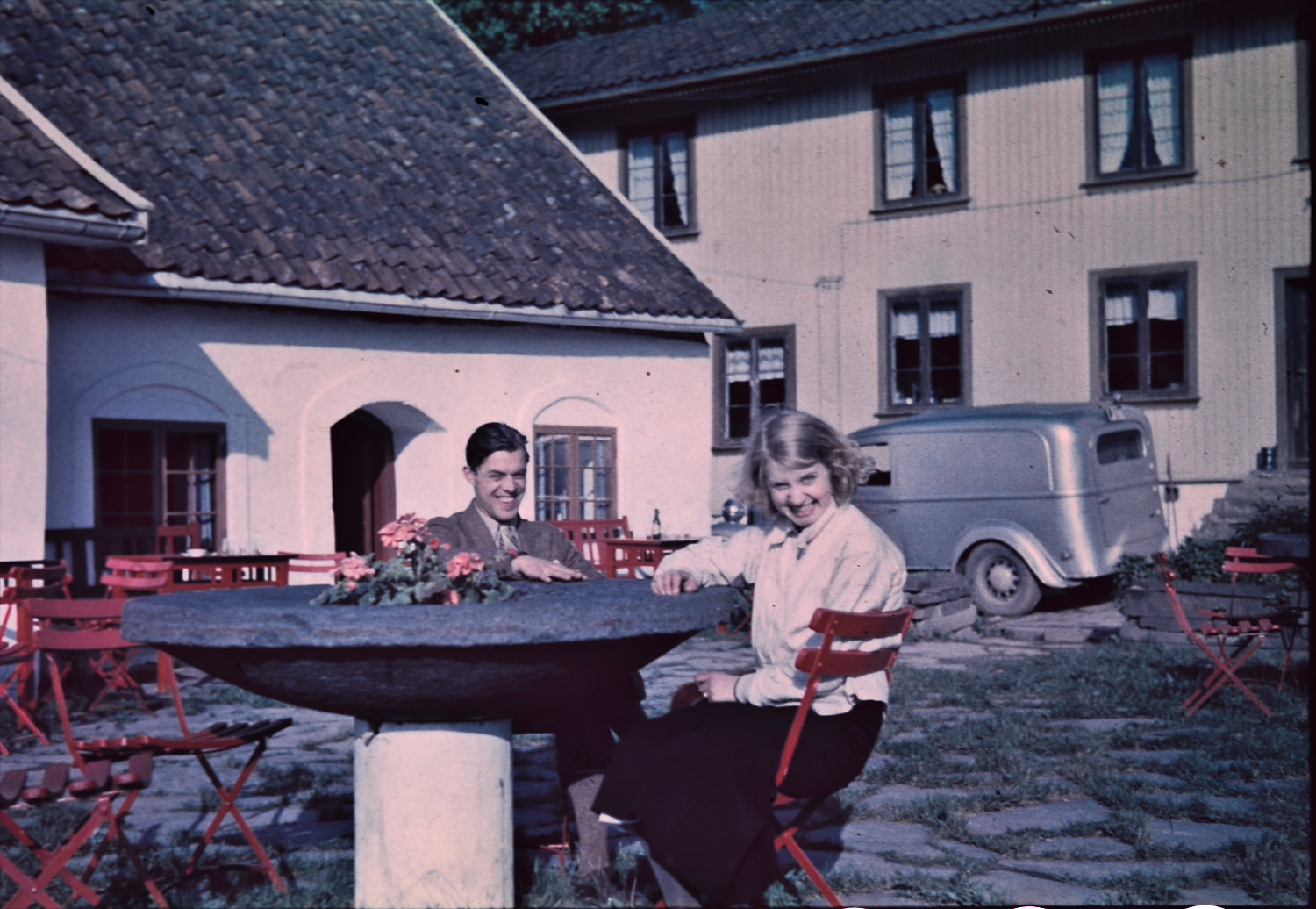
An Agfacolor slide of a café in Oslo, Norway, 1937.

The new Agfacolor was originally a reversal film used for making "slides", home movies and short documentaries. By 1939, it had also been adapted into a negative film and a print film for use by the German motion picture industry. After World War II, the Agfacolor brand was applied to several varieties of color negative film for still photography, in which the negatives were used to make color prints on paper. The reversal film was then marketed as Agfachrome. These films use Color Developing Agent 1 in their color developer.

== History ==
=== Development ===
Agfa was formed in 1867, and part of IG Farben from 1925 to 1945. Its Wolfen plant, which was the sole producer of Agfacolor film until the end of World War II, was constructed in 1909.

=== Legacy of World War II ===
Towards the end of World War II, large quantities of raw Agfacolor stock were seized by the Soviet Union and served as the basis for the Sovcolor process, which was widely used in the USSR and other Eastern bloc nations; such films produced in Poland were also described as Polcolor, the first being Adventure at Marienstadt (1954). One of the best-known Sovcolor films is War and Peace (1965–67) and many of Andrei Tarkovsky's films used it as well. Sovcolor was known for the variable quality of its colors, which led to continuity errors as colors changed between scenes; more prestigious productions used imported Eastman Kodak stock instead.

Agfa was divided into Agfa-Werke, a subsidiary of Farbenfabriken, in West Germany and Agfa Wolfen in East Germany after World War II and the division of Germany. Agfa-Werke opened a plant in Leverkusen. Agfa Wolfen sold the Agfa brand rights to Agfa-Werke in 1964, and changed its name to ORWO. Agfa-Werke merged with Gevaert that same year to form Agfa-Gevaert.

Agfacolor consumer products were also marketed in North America under the names Ansco Color and Anscochrome (from Agfa's then-US subsidiary, Agfa-Ansco). Prior to World War II, the film had been imported from Germany. After the War began, the American subsidiary was seized by the US Government. At the request of the War Department, Ansco then developed a similar color film, which it produced in its own factory in Binghamton, New York. Anscochrome was widely distributed, but met with limited commercial success in competition with Kodak product.

Ansco Color was also used in Hollywood films, including some produced by Metro-Goldwyn-Mayer. Films shot in Ansco Color included The Man on the Eiffel Tower (1949), Bwana Devil (1953), Kiss Me, Kate (1953), Seven Brides for Seven Brothers (1954), Brigadoon (1954), and Lust for Life (1956), the final film shot on this film stock. Anscochrome films for still photography were manufactured until 1977. Agfacolor was used in one of the first color French comedy and topless films with Louis de Funès called Women of Paris (fr. Ah! Les belles bacchantes) dated 1954.

==== Agfacolor during the Second World War ====
Famous professional early works made in Agfacolor were war photo reports made during Invasion of Poland (1939) by Hugo Jaeger; Paris during German occupation (1940-1944) by André Zucca; Warsaw Ghetto Uprising (1943) by Zbigniew Borowczyk (3 photos), Karol Grabski (1 photo) and Rosemarie Lincke (1 photo); Warsaw Uprising (1944) by Ewa Faryaszewska and Gerhard Wiechmann; Prague uprising (1945) by Oldřich Cerha and during Hungarian Revolution of 1956 by Jeno Kiss.

== Gallery of examples ==
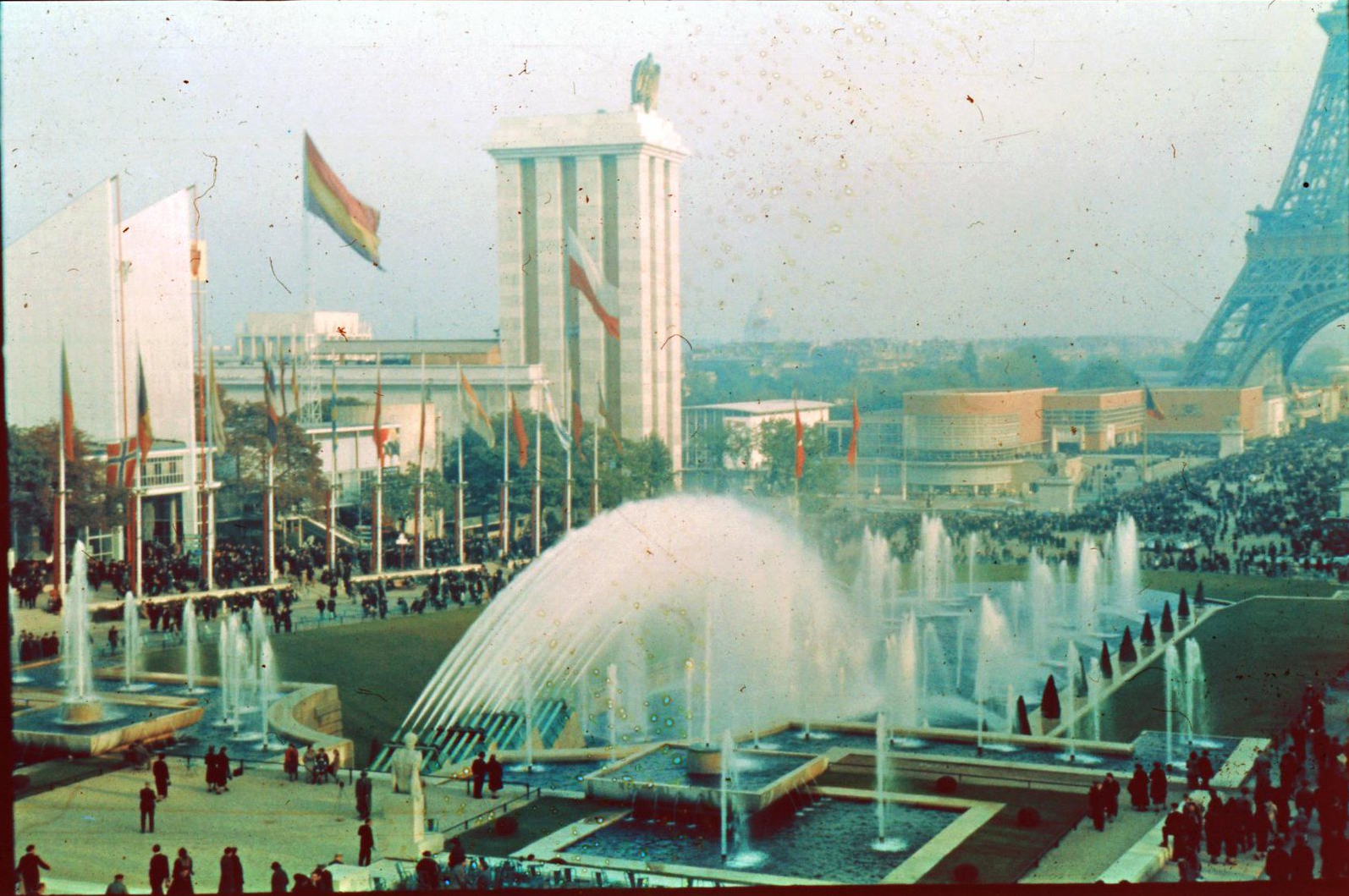
An Agfacolor slide of Paris, France, 1937.

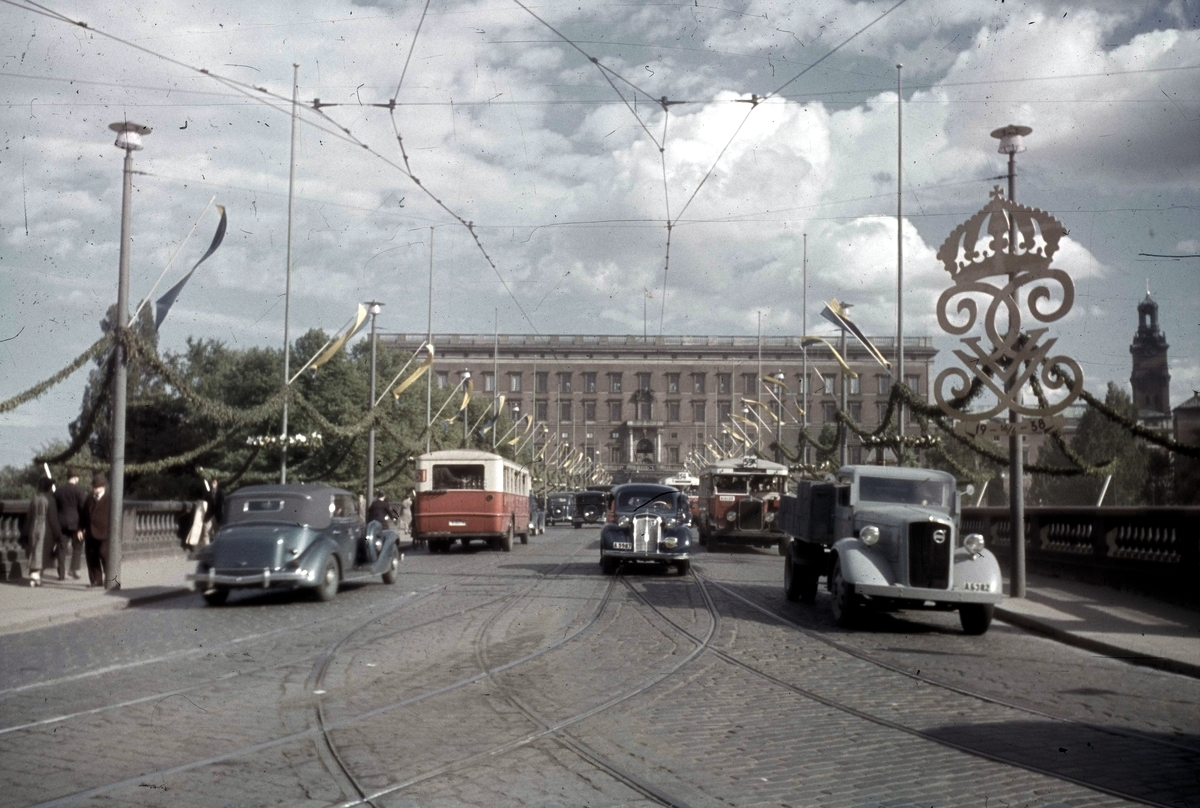
An Agfacolor slide of Stockholm, Sweden, 1938.

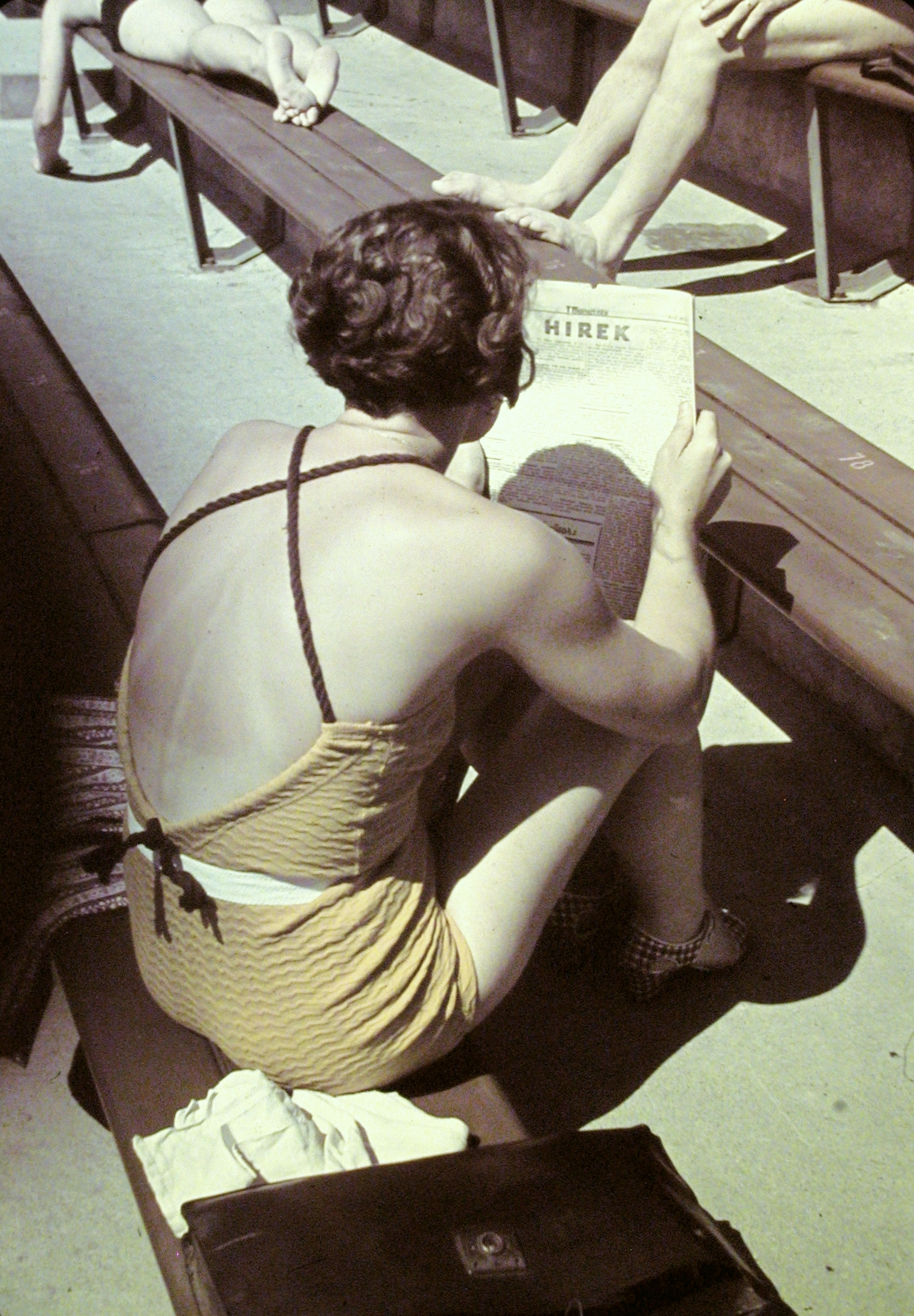
An Agfacolor slide, Hungary, 1938.

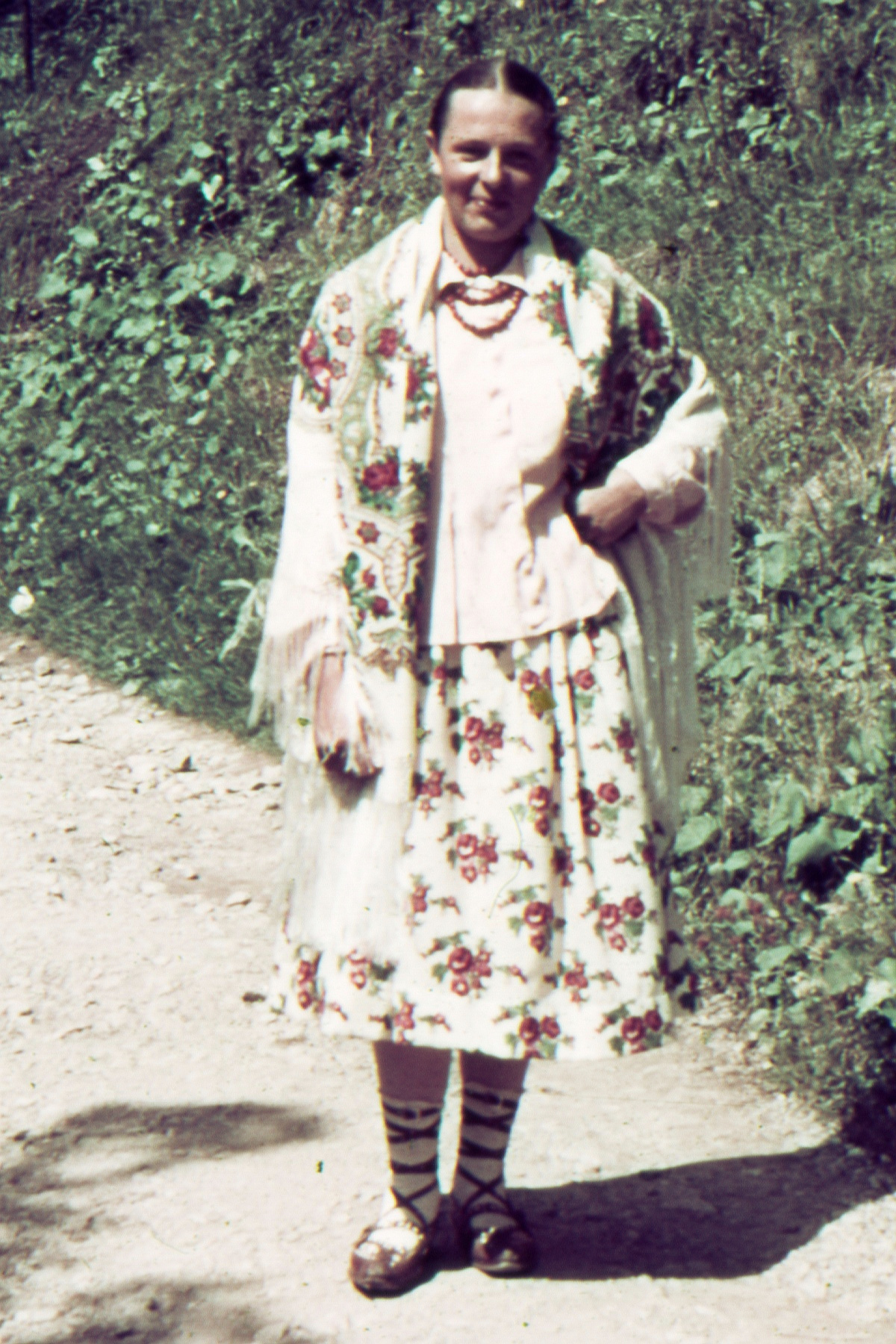
An Agfacolor slide, Zakopane, Poland, 1938.

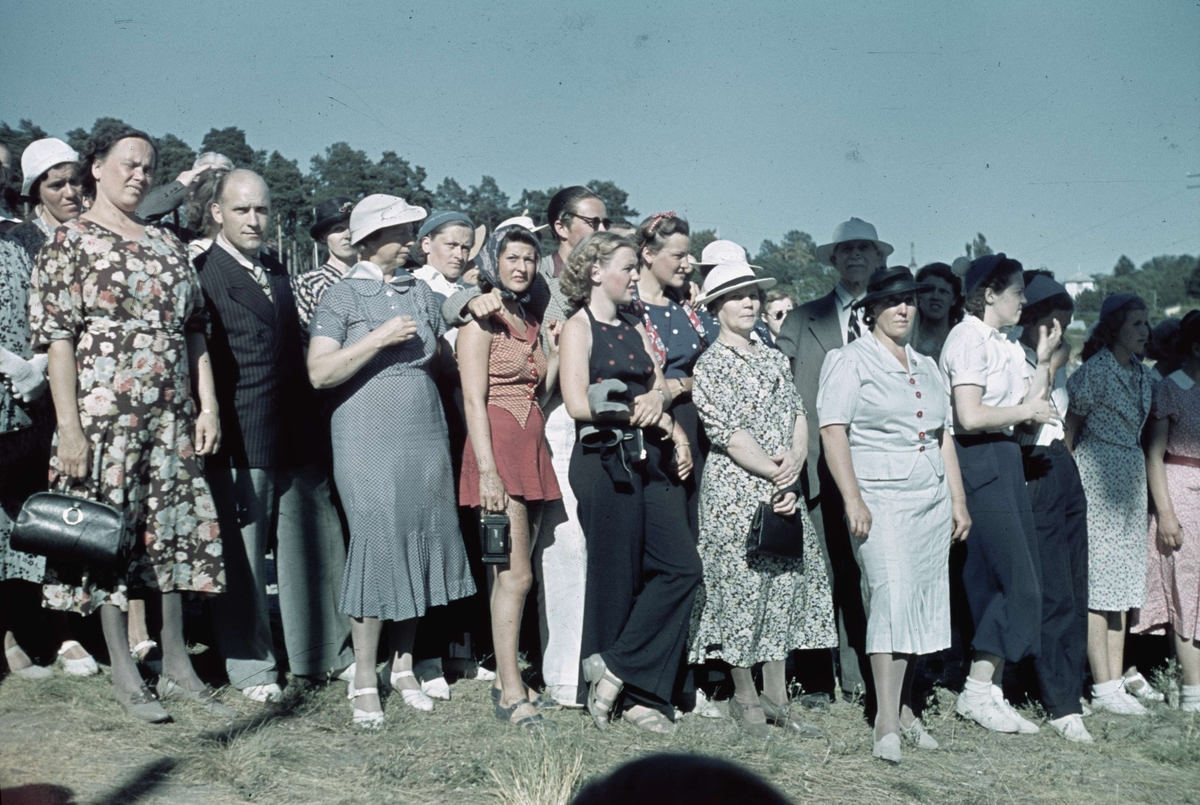
An Agfacolor slide, Sweden, 1938.

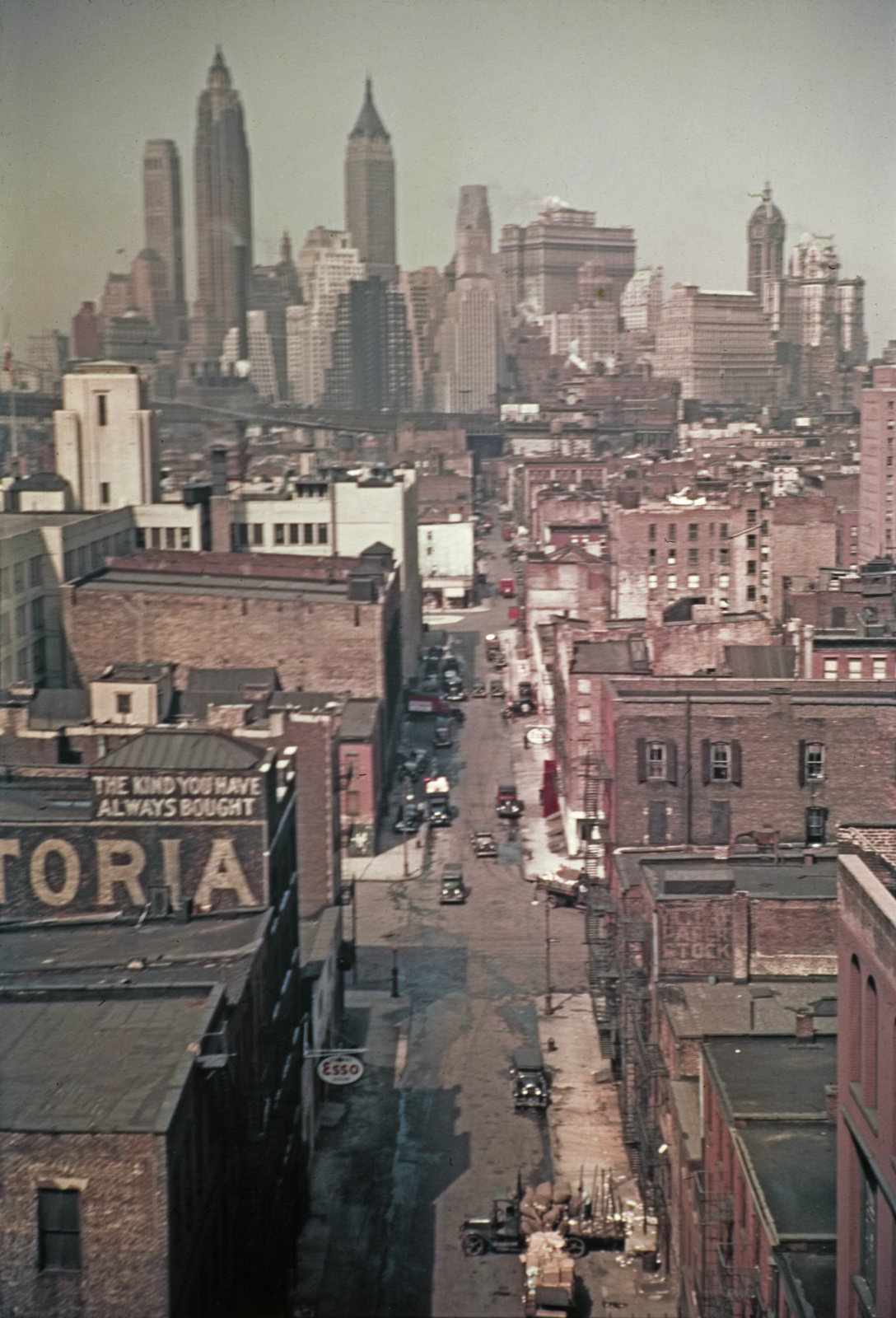
An Agfacolor slide of New York City, 1938.

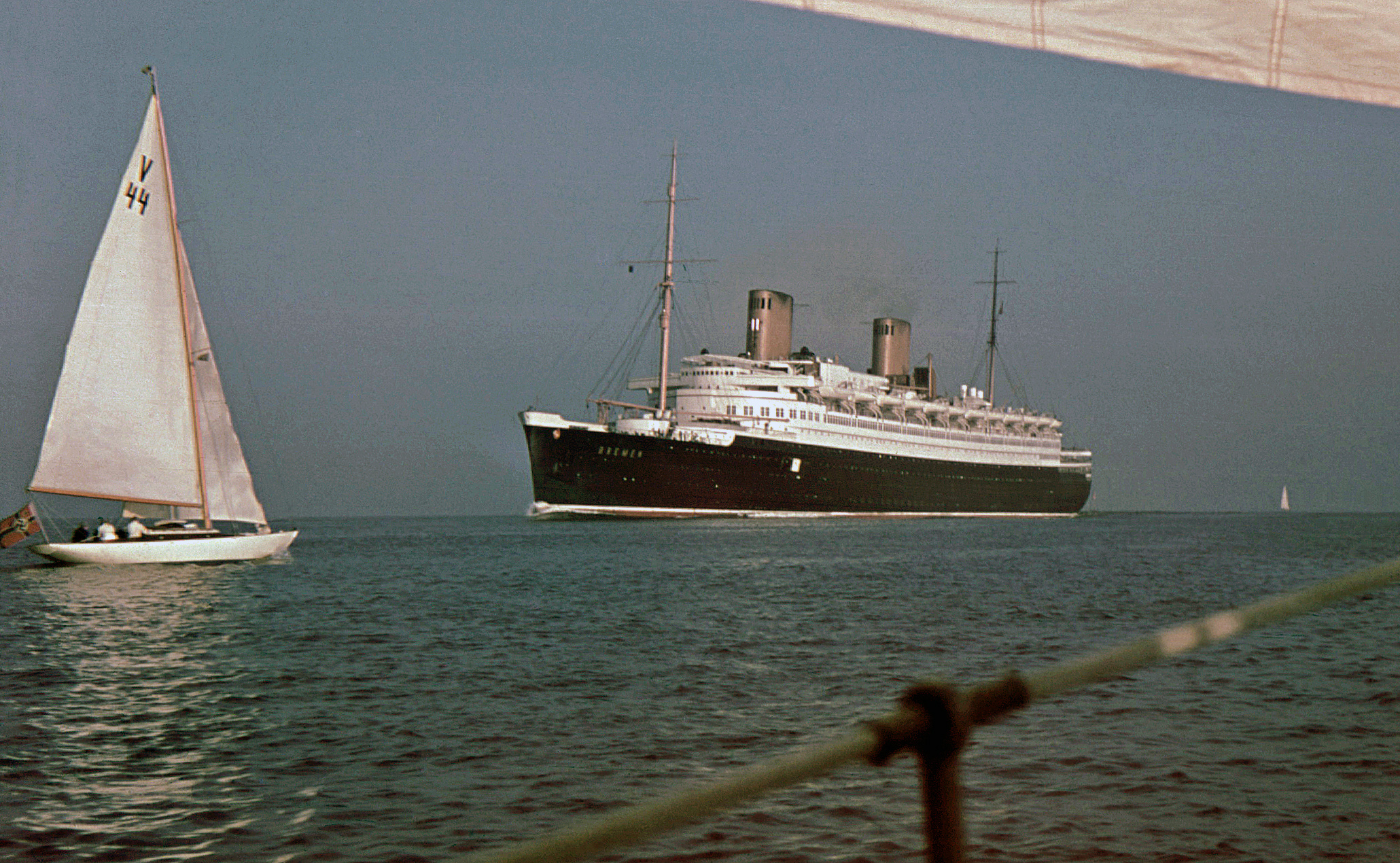
An Agfacolor slide of SS Bremen arriving at Bremerhaven, Germany, 1939.

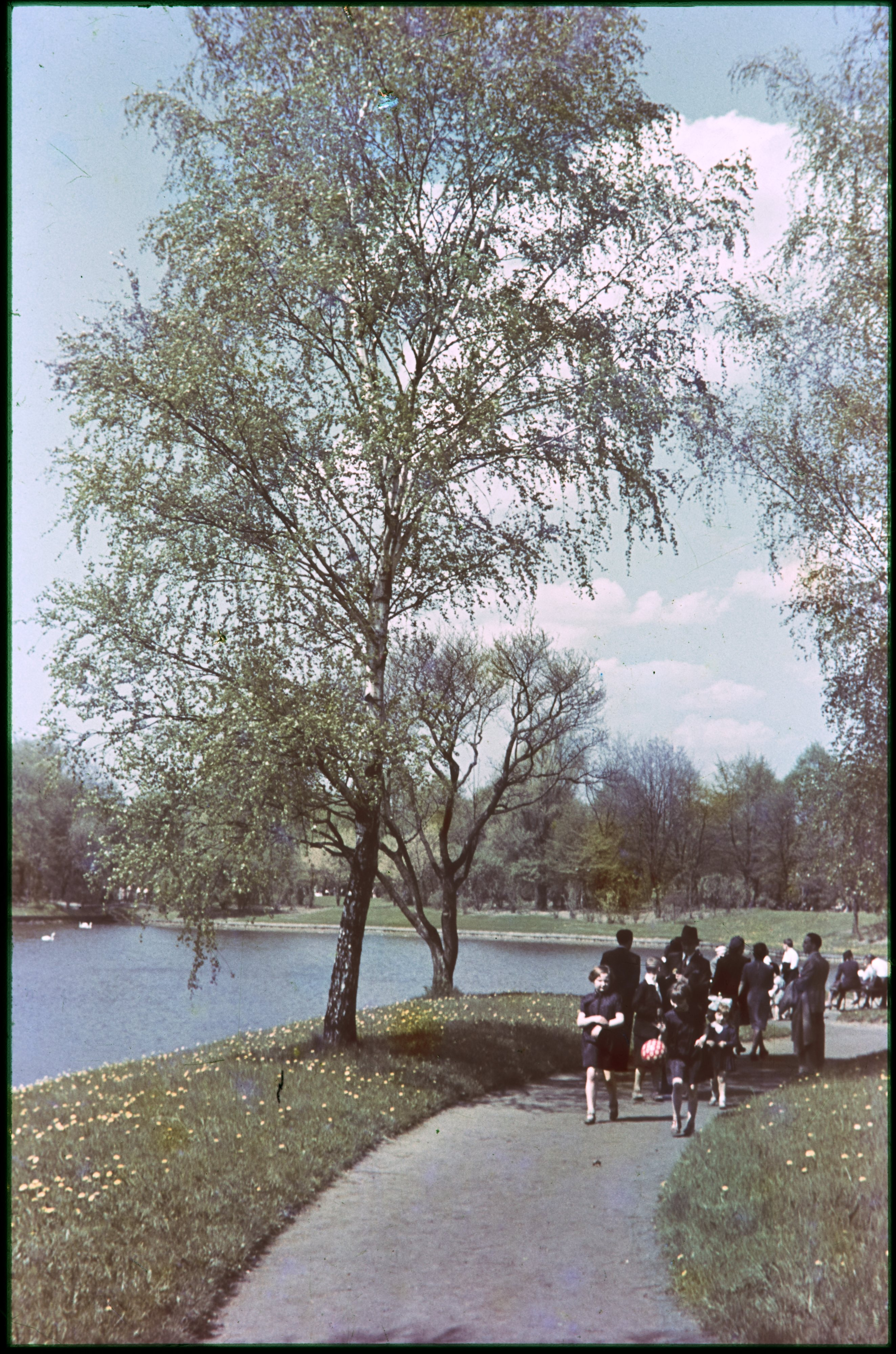
An Agfacolor slide, Warsaw, Poland, 1939.

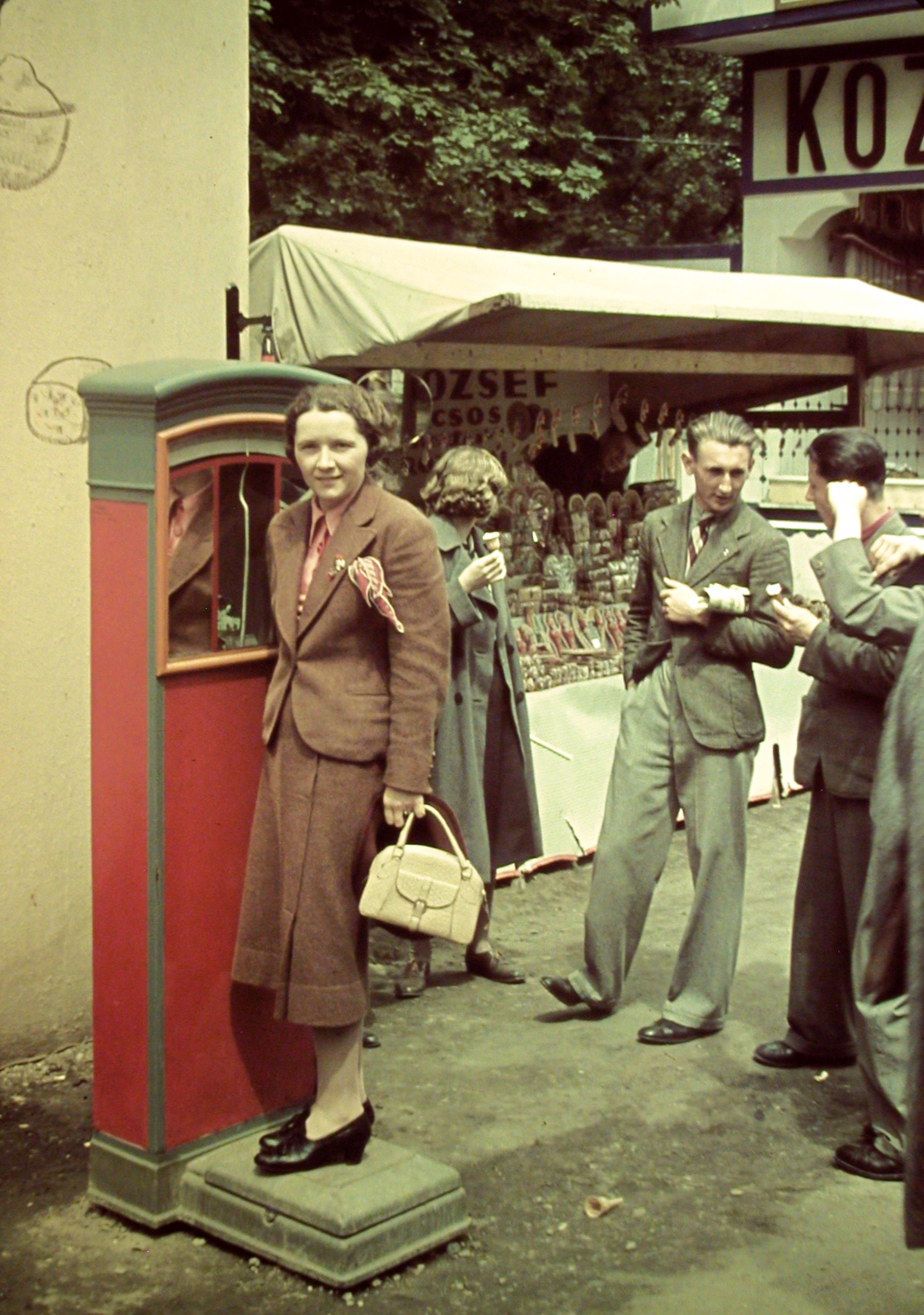
Budapest, Hungary, 1939.

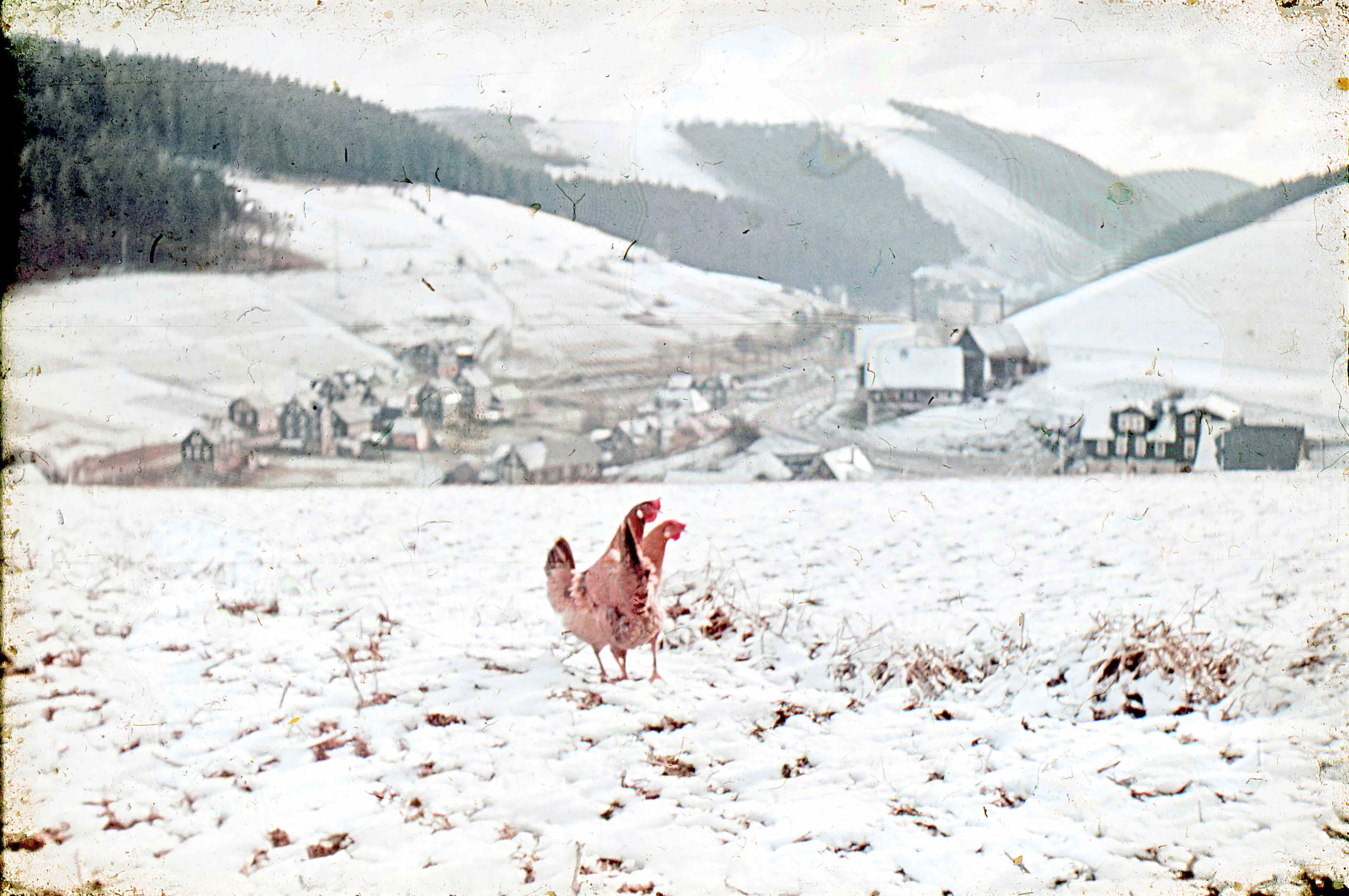
An Agfacolor slide from Germany, early 1940s. While the colors themselves have held up well, visible damage includes dust and Newton's rings.

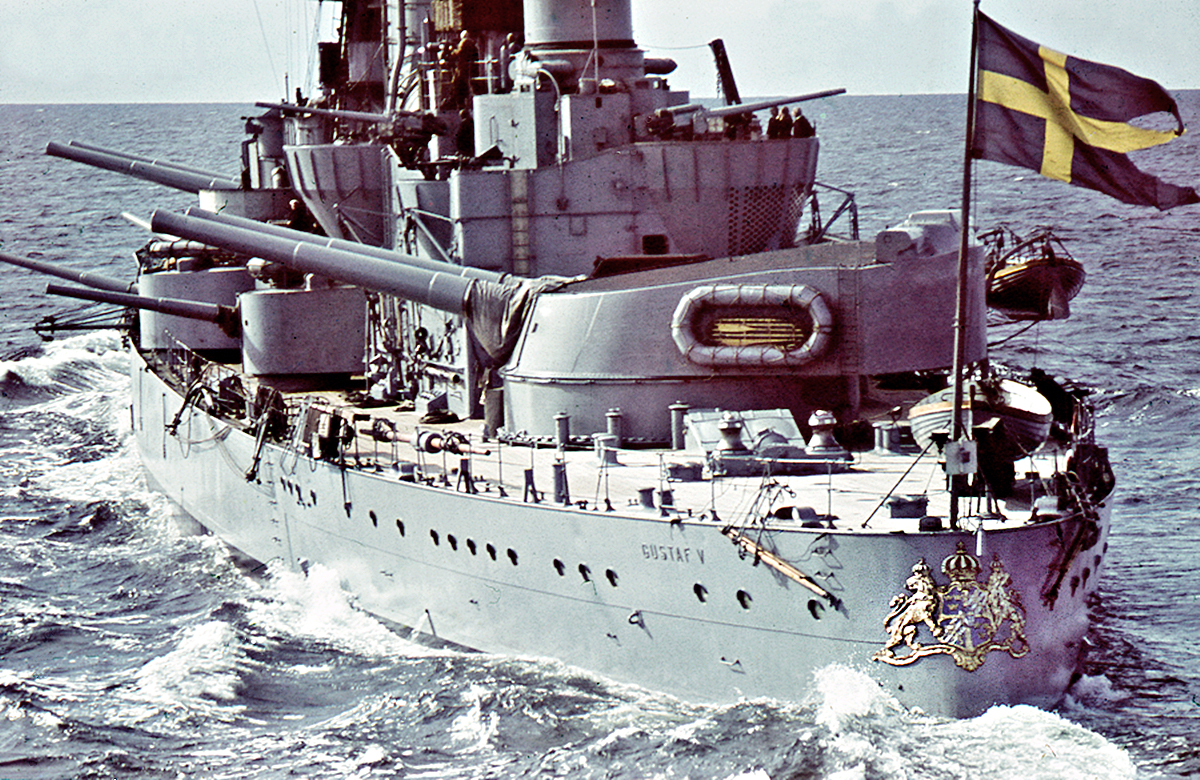
Swedish battleship HM Pansarskepp Gustaf V (An Agfacolor slide dated until 1957).

== Works cited ==
- Street, Sarah; Yumibe, Joshua, eds. (2024). Global Film Color: The Monopack Revolution at Midcentury. Rutgers University Press. ISBN 9781978836839.
