= Hugo Jaeger =

Personal photographer of Adolf Hitler

- Born: 18 January 1900
- Died: 1 January 1970 (aged 69)
- Citizenship: German
- Occupation: Photographer
- Years active: 1936–1945
- Employer: Adolf Hitler
- Known for: Privately photographing Adolf Hitler and WWII

Hugo Jaeger (18 January 1900 – 1 January 1970) was the former personal photographer of Adolf Hitler. He travelled with Hitler in the years leading up to and throughout World War II and took around 2,000 colour photographs of the German dictator and various events connected with the Nazi Germany Regime during the Spanish Civil War and The Campaigns of Second World War by example the invasion of Poland, Polish soldiers as prisoners of war resting after the lost battle against Germans, destruction of Warsaw and persecution of Jews by the German Nazis in Kutno during the Holocaust and infamous Warsaw Ghetto where people were just prisoners in the heart of the modern city during the Holocaust. Jaeger was one of the few photographers who were using color photography techniques at the time, especially Agfacolor invented in 1936.

== Early life ==
Hugo Jaeger was born on 18 January 1900.

== Career ==
Jaeger began photographing Hitler in 1936 and was doing so until the Second World War ended in 1945. Jaeger also specialised in taking color photographs of the Nazi propaganda spectacles, unlike Hitler's other personal photographer Heinrich Hoffmann. As the war was drawing to a close in 1945, Jaeger hid the photographs in a leather suitcase. He then encountered American soldiers prompting fears of potential arrest and prosecution for carrying around so many images of such a wanted man. When the soldiers opened the case however, their attention was distracted by a bottle of cognac they found there, which they opened and shared with Jaeger.

Jaeger buried the photographs inside 12 glass jars outside Munich. The photographer returned to the burial place over several years to ensure they were safe. He dug up all of the photographs ten years later in 1955, and stored them in a bank vault. In 1965, Jaeger sold them to Life magazine.

== Death and legacy ==
Jaeger died on 1 January 1970.

Life.com published the photographs as the 65th anniversary of D-Day beckoned in June 2009. The website published the photographs in four separate galleries online. One photo showed Hitler saluting German troops in Adolf Hitler Platz on 1 September 1938. Another showed the Nazi leader attending a Christmas Party in 1941. Further photos show Hitler at the International Auto Exhibition held in Berlin in 1939 and Hitler on a cruise that same year.
