= 180th Division =

180th Division may refer to:

- 180th Division (People's Republic of China)
- 180th Infantry Division (Wehrmacht), Germany
- 180th Rifle Division, Soviet Union

== See also ==
- List of military divisions by number
- 180th Brigade (disambiguation)
- 180th Regiment (disambiguation)
- 180th (disambiguation)
