= 181st Mixed Brigade =

181st Mixed Brigade 181.ª Brigada Mixta
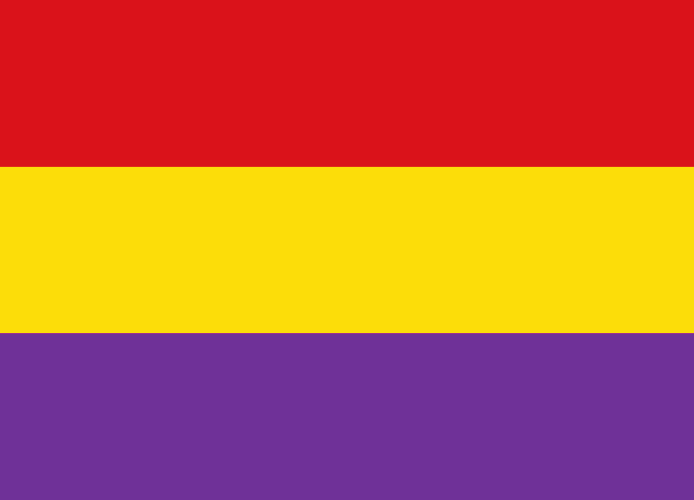
- Military flag of the Popular Army
- Active: 1938–1939
- Country: Spain
- Branch: Spanish Republican Army
- Type: Mixed Brigade
- Role: Home Defence
- Size: Four battalions: The 721, 722, 723 and 724
- Part of: 54th Division
- Engagements: Spanish Civil War

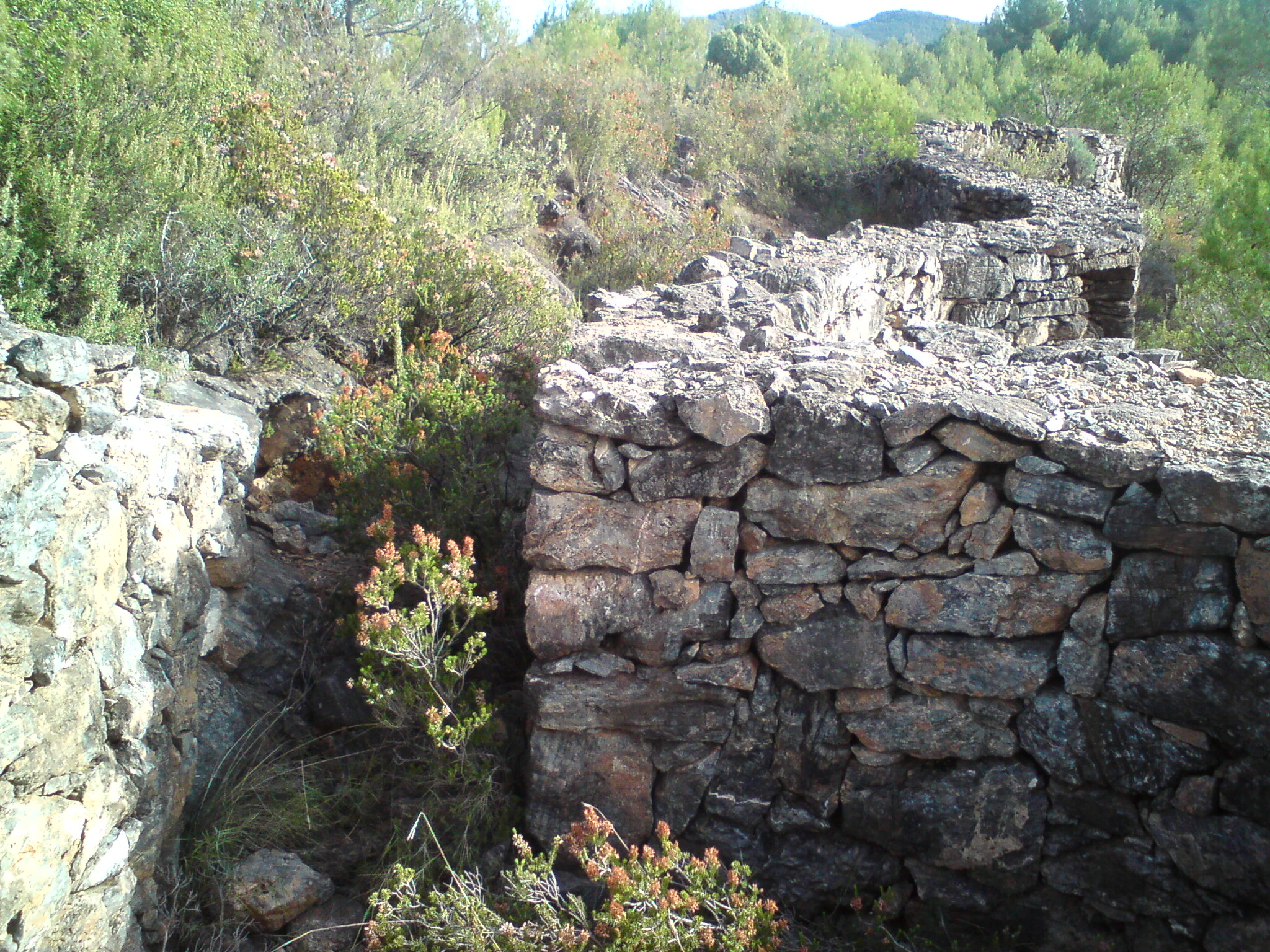
View of the XYZ Line where the 181st MB was reportedly located at the end of the war.

The 181st Mixed Brigade (Spanish: 181.ª Brigada Mixta), was a mixed brigade of the Spanish Republican Army in the Spanish Civil War.

Data are lacking regarding the names of the commanders of this unit, but the names of some soldiers are known.

== History ==
=== Northern Army unit ===
A 181st Mixed Brigade had been planned by the Spanish Republican Army Chief of Staff formed by battalions belonging to the Infantería de Marina Corps. It would have been placed under the 56th Division of the IX Army Corps of the Northern Army (Ejército del Norte), but the Republic was defeated by the rebel faction in the War in the North and the projected unit could not be established.

=== Latter unit ===
On 30 April 1938 a new unit named '181st Mixed Brigade' was established in Andalusia. It was placed under the 54th Division of the IX Army Corps of the Andalusian Army (Ejército de Andalucía) and had four battalions, the 721, 722, 723 and 724.

On 12 June 1938, in the face of the dire situation at the Levantine Front owing to the Levante Offensive the whole 54th Division was made part of the XIII Army Corps of the Levantine Army (Ejército de Levante) and moved towards Castellón. The 181st Mixed Brigade arrived to the front line on 21 July —although other sources claim that it took part in the 20 July combats, and after a few days the Levante Offensive drew to a close.

This unit then withdrew to the XYZ Line seeking the protection it afforded and stayed in that inactive front stretch until the end of the war.

== See also ==
- Mixed Brigades
- XYZ Line
