= 175th Mixed Brigade =

Spanish military unit

175th Mixed Brigade 175.ª Brigada Mixta
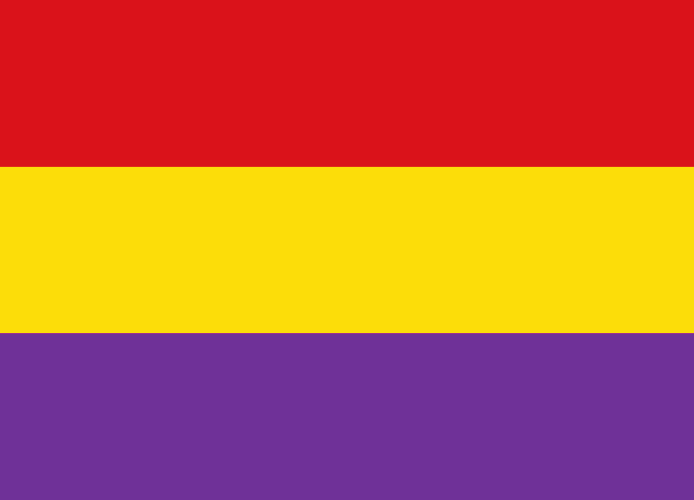
- Military flag of the Popular Army
- Active: 1938–1939
- Country: Spain
- Branch: Spanish Republican Army
- Type: Mixed Brigade
- Role: Home Defence
- Size: Four battalions: The 697, 698, 699 and 700
- Part of: 52nd Division
- Engagements: Spanish Civil War

Commanders
- Notable commanders: Rafael Barredo González

Map of the Republican zone in November 1936. The former 10th Santander Brigade was operating in the north by the Bay of Biscay until the area fell to the rebels at the end of the War in the North.

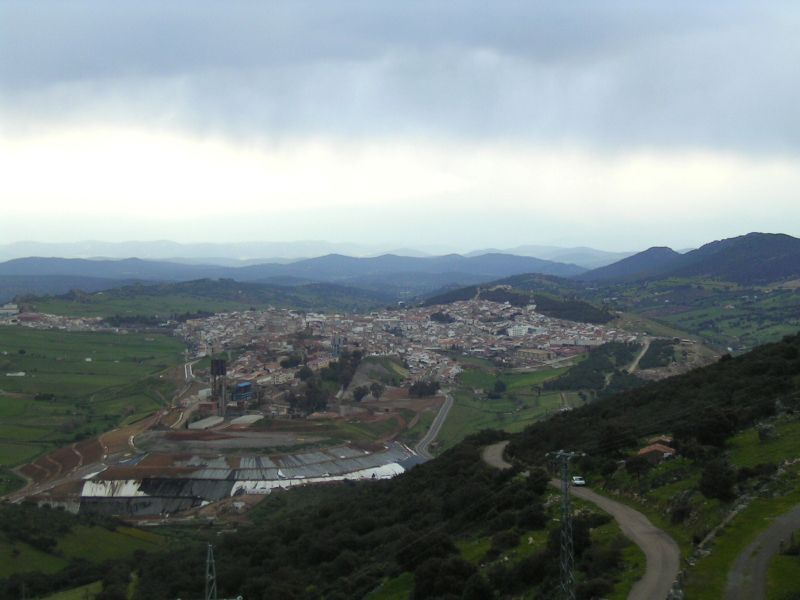
View of the Almadén area where the 175th Mixed Brigade was reported to be in a front line location towards the end of the war.

The 175th Mixed Brigade (Spanish: 175.ª Brigada Mixta), was a mixed brigade of the Spanish Republican Army in the Spanish Civil War. Its number was formerly corresponding to the 10th Santander Brigade, a unit operating in Santander, Spain but was assigned to a new unit in the spring of 1938 in Valencia Province and had four battalions, 697, 698, 699 and 700.

It is known that this mixed brigade ended up in the area of Sierra Morena at the end of the conflict, but information regarding the officers of this unit is fragmentary and deficient and only the surname or first name of some have survived. According to the few available data the last commanders of the battalions of the 175th Mixed Brigade were Captain Firmas of the 697 Battalion, Major Trigueros of the 698 Battalion, Major Vicente Olmedo of the 699 Battalion and Major Morales of the 700 Battalion. There was also a commissar known as 'Isidoro'.

== History ==
=== Santander unit ===
On 6 August 1938 the Spanish Republican Army Chief of Staff reorganized the Northern Army (Ejército del Norte) and the 10th Santander Brigade was renamed as 175th Mixed Brigade. It was placed under the 54th Division of the XV Army Corps of the Northern Army. However, following the Battle of Santander in the summer of 1937 the isolated Republican territory in Northern Spain fell to the rebel faction and this unit ended up being disbanded in mid-September 1937.

=== Latter unit ===
On 30 April 1938 a new unit named '175th Mixed Brigade' was established in Silla, Valencia. It was formed with the remainders of the 38th and the 196th mixed brigades, which had suffered many casualties and had fallen into disarray following the crippling rebel Aragon Offensive that split the Spanish republican territory in two. Once established the new brigade was placed under the 52nd Division of the XXI Army Corps of the Levantine Army (Ejército de Levante). The commander of the unit was Militia Major Rafael Barredo González.

On 10 August 1938 the 175th Mixed Brigade was transferred along with its division to the Extremaduran Front in the west, where it became part of the XVI Army Corps of the Extremaduran Army (Ejército de Extremadura). On 22 August it saw combat action in the Monterrubio-Puerto Hurraco-Castuera sector, but its attacks against the Francoist army were not successful and after three days of efforts it was not able to occupy Zarza-Capilla.

At the beginning of September it was withdrawn back to the East, to Ademuz, in order to undergo training to become a unit of shock troops, which was what was needed in the Extremaduran Front. Meanwhile, Major Rafael Barredo was replaced by Militia Major Juan Pellisó Martín.

==== End of the brigade ====
In December the 175th Mixed Brigade was sent again to the front in Extremadura in order to take part in the Battle of Peñarroya. It was concentrated in Hinojosa del Duque in order to become part of the Agrupación Toral temporary army group.

On 7 January 1939 the 175th Mixed Brigade began a series of attacks against rebel positions near the road between Peraleda del Zaucejo and La Granja de Torrehermosa, becoming so badly shattered that it had to be withdrawn from the front on 13 January. After the many casualties it was hastily rebuilt and then placed to defend the front line in the Reales Minas de Azogue area of Almadén and near Santa Eufemia until the end of the war when data about its final fate are lost.

== Commanders ==
- Commanders in Chief (Latter 175th MB)
  - Rafael Barredo González
  - Juan Pellisó Martín
- Commissars
  - Isidoro

== See also ==
- Mixed Brigades
- Battle of Valsequillo
