= 175th =

175th is the ordinal form of the number 175. 175th or One hundred and seventy-fifth may also refer to:

- A fraction, 1/175, equal to one of 175 equal parts

== Geography ==
- 175th meridian east, a line of longitude
- 175th meridian west, a line of longitude
- 175th Street (disambiguation)

== Military ==
- 175th Brigade (disambiguation)
- 175th Rifle Division, Red Aemy
- 175th Regiment (disambiguation)

== See also ==
- June 24, 175th day of the year in a standard year
