= 182nd Division =

182nd Division may refer to:

- 182nd Division (People's Republic of China)
- 182nd Infantry Division (Wehrmacht), Germany
- 182nd Rifle Division, Soviet Union

== See also ==
- List of military divisions by number
- 182nd Brigade (disambiguation)
- 182nd Regiment (disambiguation)
- 182nd (disambiguation)
