= 180th =

180th is the ordinal form of the number 180. 180th or One hundred and wightieth may also refer to:

- A fraction, 1/180, equal to one of 180 equal parts

== Geography ==
- 180th meridian, a line of longitude where meridians east and meridians west meet
- 180th Street (disambiguation)

== Military ==
- 180th Brigade (disambiguation)
- 180th Division
- 180th Regiment (disambiguation)

== See also ==
- June 29, 180th day of the year in a standard year
