= 54th Division (Spain) =

- 54.ª División
- Active: April 1938–March 1939
- Country: Spain
- Allegiance: (Second Spanish Republic) Republican faction
- Branch: Spanish Republican Army
- Type: Infantry
- Size: Division
- Engagements: Spanish Civil War: Levante Offensive

Commanders
- Notable commanders: Francisco Fervenza Fernández

The 54th Division was one of the divisions of the People's Army of the Republic that were organized during the Spanish Civil War on the basis of the Mixed Brigades. It came to operate on the Levante front.

== History ==
During 1937, on the Northern Front there had already been a division that used this numbering. (Note: This unit, commanded by Eloy Fernández Navamuel, had been created in the summer of 1937 within the XV Army Corps (Santander). It inherited the structure of the old «Santander 3rd Division». The new unit was made up of the 173rd, 174th and 175th mixed brigades, all of them made up of former militias and recruits. The unit had a very short operational life, as it was destroyed during the Battle of Santander. The commander himself, Fernández Navamuel, fled from Spain.)

In the spring of 1938, within the IX Army Corps, a division was created that was numbered "54". Its first commander-in-chief was Lieutenant Colonel Martín Calvo Calvo. It was made up of the newly created 180th, 181st and 182nd mixed brigades. Some time later it was sent to the Levante front, where it was included in the XIII Army Corps. It participated in the fighting in the Levante, resisting the nationalist offensive against Valencia. During the operations, the unit had an outstanding performance, coming to be congratulated by the republican authorities. On 11 August 1938 command of the unit passed to the anarchist Francisco Fervenza Fernández. During the rest of the war the unit remained inactive on the Levante front.

== Command ==
Commanders

- Martín Calvo Calvo;
- Francisco Fervenza Fernández;

Commissars

- Eleuterio Dorado Lanza, of the IR;

Chiefs of Staff

- José García Benedito;
- Gonzalo Castelló Gómez-Trevijano;

== Organization ==
| Date | Attached Army Corps | Integrated Mixed Brigades | Battle front |
|---|---|---|---|
| 30 April 1938 | IX Army Corps | 180th, 181st and 182nd | Andalusia |
| August 1938 | XIII Army Corps | 180th, 181st and 182nd | Levante |

== Bibliography ==
- Álvarez, Santiago (1989). Los comisarios políticos en el Ejército Popular de la República. Ediciós do Castro.
- Engel, Carlos (1999). Historia de las Brigadas Mixtas del Ejército Popular de la República. Madrid: Almena. 84-922644-7-0.
- Martínez Bande, José Manuel (1981). La batalla de Pozoblanco y el cierre de la bolsa de Mérida. Madrid: Editorial San Martín.
- Navarro, Ramón Juan (2010). Resistir es vencer. El frente de Viver en la Guerra Civil española. Lulu.com. ISBN 978-1-4466-9664-4.
- Solla Gutiérrez, Miguel Ángel (2010). La República sitiada. Trece meses de Guerra Civil en Cantabria. Santander: Ediciones de la Universidad de Cantabria.
