= 180th Mixed Brigade =

- 180.ª Brigada Mixta
- Active: April 1938–March 1939
- Country: Spain
- Allegiance: (Second Spanish Republic) Republican faction
- Branch: Spanish Republican Army
- Type: Infantry
- Size: Brigade
- Engagements: Spanish Civil War: Levante Offensive

Commanders
- Notable commanders: Francisco Fervenza Fernández

The 180th Mixed Brigade was a brigade of the People's Army of the Republic that fought in the Spanish Civil War.

== History ==
The unit was created on April 30, 1938, on the Andalusia front, being assigned to the 54th Division of the IX Corps. Command fell to Francisco Fervenza Fernández, a veteran of the War in the North.

On June 12 the brigade was sent along with the rest of the division to the Castellón front, aimed at XYZ line. On July 21 the 180th Mixed Brigade saw combat, resulting in a bitter struggle with the nationalist forces advancing towards Valencia. The 720th battalion distinguished itself especially during these operations. After the beginning of the Battle of the Ebro the fighting subsided. In August 1938, command of the brigade was assumed by Manuel Chaves.

It did not intervene in any significant capacity for the remainder of the conflict.

== Command ==
Commanders

- Francisco Fervenza Fernández;
- Manuel Chaves;

== Bibliography ==
- Engel, Carlos (1999). Historia de las Brigadas Mixtas del Ejército Popular de la República (in Spanish). Madrid: Almena. ISBN 84-922644-7-0.
- Navarro, Ramón Juan (2010). Resistir es vencer. El frente de Viver en la Guerra Civil española (in Spanish). Lulu.com. ISBN 978-1-4466-9664-4.
- Martínez Bande, José Manuel (1981). La batalla de Pozoblanco y el cierre de la bolsa de Mérida (in Spanish). Madrid: Editorial San Martín.
