= Francisco Fervenza Fernández =

Spanish military personnel

- Born: 15 August 1907; Santander, Spain
- Died: 13 January 1998 (aged 90); Valencia, Spain
- Military career
- Allegiance: CNT
- Service: Confederal militias (1936–1937), Spanish Republican Army (1937–1939)
- Unit: 12th Santanderina Brigade
- Commands: 180th Mixed Brigade (1938); 54th Division (1938–1939)
- Conflicts: Spanish Civil War: Battle of Santander; Levante Offensive

Francisco Fervenza Fernández (Santander, Spain, 15 August 1907 – Valencia, 13 January 1998) was a Cantabrian anarcho-syndicalist.

== Biography ==
He was born in Santander on 15 August 1907. A metallurgical worker by profession, he became a trade union activist and member of the National Confederation of Labor (Spanish: Confederación Nacional del Trabajo, CNT).

After the outbreak of the Spanish Civil War joined the confederal militias. He commanded a battalion of the CNT that acted in the mountainous area of Cantabria. Later was named commander of the 12th Santanderina Brigade, with which he took part in the War in the North.

At the end of the war he was arrested in Alicante, being imprisoned. He was moved to Santander, where he was tried and sentenced to death, although his sentence was commuted thanks to favorable testimonies received by civilians and relatives of those who had been saved by him.

He died in Valencia on 13 January 1998.

== Bibliography ==
- Engel, Carlos (1999). Historia de las Brigadas mixtas del Ejército Popular de la República (in Spanish). Madrid: Almena. ISBN 84-922644-7-0.
- Gutiérrez Flores, Jesús (2006). Guerra civil en Cantabria y pueblos de Castilla (in Spanish). Libros en Red.
- Solla Gutiérrez, Miguel Ángel (2010). La República sitiada. Trece meses de Guerra Civil en Cantabria (in Spanish). Santander: Ediciones de la Universidad de Cantabria.
