= 181st Regiment =

181st Regiment may refer to:

- 181st Field Regiment, Royal Artillery
- 181st Infantry Regiment (United States)
- 181st Ohio Infantry Regiment, a Union regiment in the American Civil War

== See also ==
- 181st Brigade (disambiguation)
- 181st Division (disambiguation)
