= 182nd Mixed Brigade =

182nd Mixed Brigade 182.ª Brigada Mixta
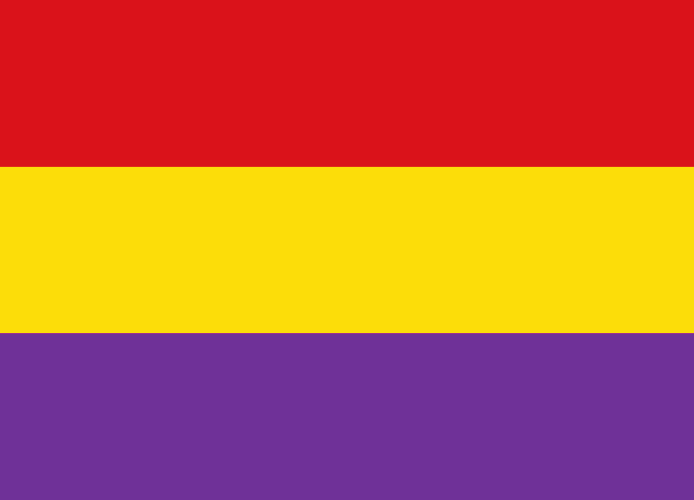
- Military flag of the Popular Army
- Active: 1938–1939
- Country: Spain
- Branch: Spanish Republican Army
- Type: Mixed Brigade
- Role: Home Defence
- Size: Four battalions: The 725, 726, 727 and 728
- Part of: 54th Division
- Engagements: Spanish Civil War

Commanders
- Notable commanders: Pablo Careaga Odriozola

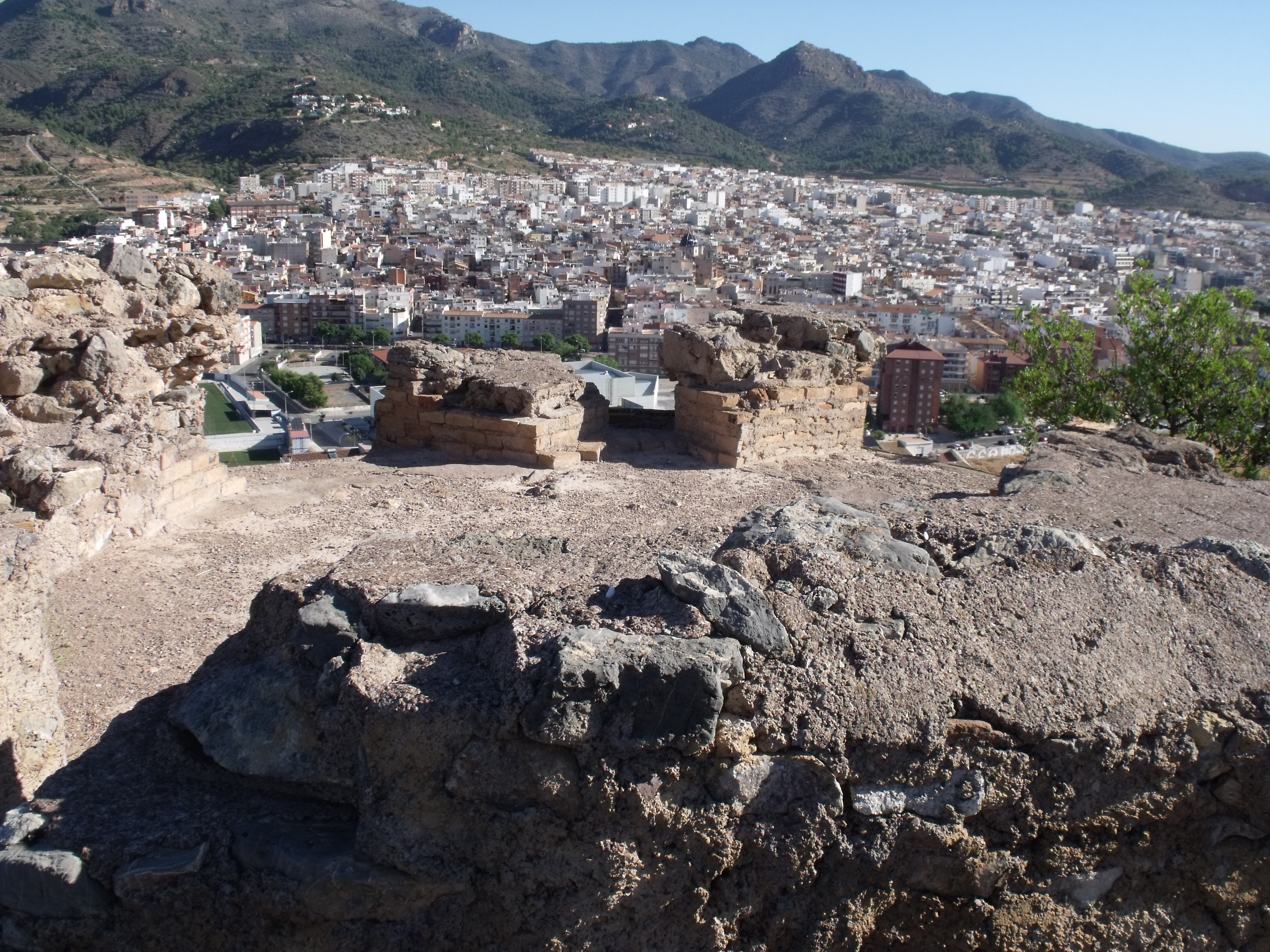
View of the XYZ Line near La Vall d'Uixó, where the 182nd MB was reported to be located at the end of the war.

The 182nd Mixed Brigade (Spanish: 182.ª Brigada Mixta), was a mixed brigade of the Spanish Republican Army in the Spanish Civil War. It was formed in the spring of 1938 in Andalusia and had four battalions, the 725, 726, 727 and 728.

Apparently this mixed brigade ended up in the last Republican zone behind the XYZ Line at the end of the conflict. But data are lacking regarding its final fate.

== History ==
=== Northern Army unit ===
In 1937 the Spanish Republican Army Chief of Staff had planned to form a 182nd Mixed Brigade made up from battalions belonging to the Carabineros Corps that would have been placed under the 56th Division of the XVI Army Corps as a reserve of the Northern Army (Ejército del Norte). However, in the summer of 1937 the isolated Republican territory in Northern Spain fell to the rebel faction and this unit ended up not being established.

=== Latter unit ===
On 30 April 1938 a new unit named '182nd Mixed Brigade' was established in Andalusia. It was placed under the 54th Division of the IX Army Corps of the Andalusian Army (Ejército de Andalucía). The commander of the unit was Militia Major Pablo Careaga Odriozola. When the 54th Mixed Brigade was disbanded its troops and materiel were integrated into the newly formed 182nd Mixed Brigade.

On 12 June 1938, in the face of the imminent takeover of Castellón de la Plana by the Francoist armies, the 54th Division was transferred to this front in order to become part of the XIII Army Corps of the Levantine Army (Ejército de Levante). But when the 182nd Mixed Brigade arrived to the front line on 21 July the city had already been lost to the rebel forces. Since the situation was irreversible the 182nd Mixed Brigade withdrew southwards, seeking the protection afforded by the XYZ Line.

It seems that this unit remained in this relatively less active area of the front, seeing little action until the end of the Civil War. Some members of the brigade managed to reach France, but the fate of many others is unknown.

== See also ==
- Mixed Brigades
- XYZ Line
