= 181st =

181st is the ordinal form of the number 181. 181st or One hundred and eighty-first may also refer to:

- A fraction, 1/181, equal to one of 181 equal parts

== Military ==
- 181st Brigade (disambiguation)
- 181st Division (disambiguation)
- 181st Regiment (disambiguation)

== See also ==
- June 30, 181st day of the year in a standard year
