= Carlos Romero Giménez =

Spanish soldier, resistance fighter and human rights advocate

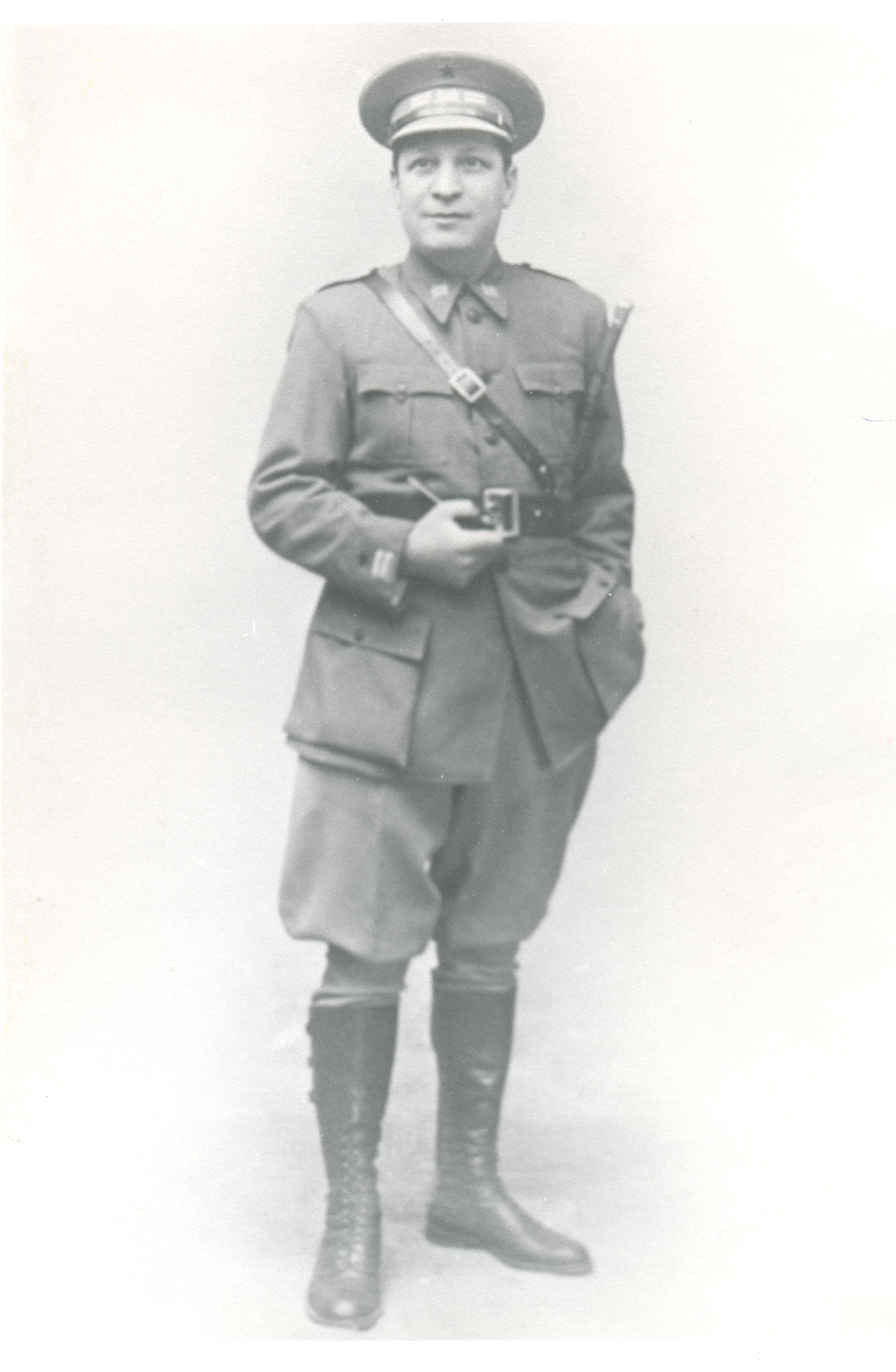
- Colonel Carlos Romero Giménez
- Born: 7 November 1890; Madrid, Kingdom of Spain
- Died: 11 September 1978 (aged 87); Mexico City
- Burial place: ashes spread half in Mexico and half in Puente de los Franceses (Madrid), Spain
- Military career
- Allegiance: Kingdom of Spain (1908–1931); Spanish Republic (1931–1939) (Free France) French Resistance
- Branch: Spanish Army; Spanish Republican Army
- Service years: 1908–1939
- Rank: Colonel
- Commands: 4.ª Brigada Mixta, 6.ª División; II Cuerpo del Ejército; XIII Cuerpo del Ejército
- Conflicts: Rif War; Spanish Civil War: Siege of Madrid; Battle of Brunete; Campaign of Levante; Catalonia Offensive; World War II: Maquis
- Awards: Laureate Cross of Saint Ferdinand; Medal of Courage
- Other work: Human rights advocate, Writer

Carlos Romero Giménez, sometimes misspelled Jiménez, (7 November 1890 – 11 September 1978) was a Spanish soldier loyal to the Spanish Republic, and one of the most prominent figures in the Siege of Madrid during the Spanish Civil War. Subsequently, a member of the French Resistance, he fought the Nazi occupation from Bordeaux as part of the Maquis. He was President of the Spanish League for Human Rights.

== Biography ==
He was born in Madrid, at 5 Carrera de San Francisco Street. His father was Colonel Manuel Romero Salas, who was from an Andalusian family from Medina-Sidonia, Cádiz. His mother was María Giménez Nuñez. He joined the Spanish army on 2 December 1908. He participated in the Rif War, and received numerous awards, including the Laureate Cross of Saint Ferdinand.

Prior to the Insurrection of Jaca, he was detained as a result of his participation in the uprising of Madrid in favor of the Republic and against the dictatorship of Primo de Rivera. He spent two years in military prisons under a request for death penalty. He was released thanks to an amnesty granted by General Dámaso Berenguer, and was later assigned to a Regiment stationed in Santa Cruz de Tenerife, Canary Islands, where he remained until 14 April 1931. As soon as the Second Spanish Republic was proclaimed, Romero returned to Madrid to work on policy with the new government.

== Second Republic ==
Romero retired from the Army under the Azaña Law, and served as Commercial Attaché for Spain in Portugal between 1931 and 1932. As attaché, and subsequently back in Spain, he helped Portuguese people persecuted by the Estado Novo of António de Oliveira Salazar.

He was the founder and Director of the Hispanic-Lusitan Magazine, as well as the illustrated military technology magazine called Defensa Nacional, Revista Española de Técnica Militar, (National Defense, Spanish Technical Journal).

As General Secretary of the National Committee for the Monument to the Martyrs of Jaca, on 20 August 1934, he dismissed Luis Romero Basart (known among the Spanish refugees as "the Evil Romero") from his post as Treasurer of the committee. Later, Romero Basart was dismissed for abandoning his post while acting as a colonel of the Spanish Republican Air Force. In his book Under the Claws of the Gestapo (see below) Romero Giménez claims that Romero Basart "had offered himself and was admitted to the Gestapo for spying and reporting activities of Spanish political refugees in France", and that Romero Basart eventually turned him over to the Gestapo.

For several years, Romero Giménez was vice-president of the Spanish League for Human Rights, an organization founded in 1922 under the presidency of Miguel de Unamuno. After the death of Josep Puig d'Asprer he assumed the Presidency. Amongst the League's members were Azorin, Dalí, Falla, Azaña, Ortega y Gasset, Miró, Luis Simarro, Américo Castro and García Lorca.

Colonel Romero Giménez obtained a patent in 1935 for an elevated railway system that was to be driven by propellers. It was to consist of ultra-light aerodynamic cars suspended from a rolling mechanism, and travel at 300 km/h. A control and signaling system was to allow frequencies of three minutes between cars.

== Civil War ==
At the onset of the uprising that led to the Spanish Civil War, Romero Giménez voluntarily re-joined the Armed Forces of the Republican forces - with the rank of captain - to fight the Nationalists. He was promoted to commander on 19 July 1936, two days after the beginning of the conflict. During war, as the former Republican Army reorganized after Arturo Arellano Fontán's death, he was assigned to head the 4th Mixed Brigade.

He was one of the commanders of the columns that defended Madrid (during the Siege of Madrid) from attacks led by General Varela. Starting in November 1936, following orders from Colonel Aureliano Álvarez-Coque, Romero commanded a battalion from the Bridge of the French, which was of crucial importance because of its strategic location on the Manzanares River. He effectively repelled attempted crossings and denied access to Madrid's city center. For his heroic performance he was promoted by General Miaja to Lieutenant Colonel, and was officially congratulated on the November 18 Agenda. The Government of the Republic later officially confirmed General Miaja's orders, and officially granted him such rank in April 1938.

Because of disagreements with anarchists, Colonel Romero Giménez requested the dismissal of Ricardo Sanz, a Catalan anarcho-syndicalist, whom he accused of mistreating the soldiers and of bringing prostitutes to the trenches. He suggested to Miaja to Sanz's column (the former Durruti Column) be disbanded, and that its personnel be distributed amongst the remaining units fighting in the front.

According to historian Ramón Salas Larrazábal, Romero Giménez was the "greatest hero of the defense of Madrid".

Romero Giménez headed of the 6th Division of the Republican Armed Forces From 1 May 1937, when Alzugaray left its command vacant. On July 1, he was placed in command of the Second Army Corps, which defended the outskirts of Madrid. He participated in the Battle of Brunete, although the performance of his unit was poor in the district of Usera. As commander of the Second Army Corps, he said, regarding forced recruitments that morale in his troops remained good amongst experienced militants but poor amongst recruits, due to their "complete ignorance of the reasons why we fight and a lack of citizen preparedness and desire for freedom".

In July 1938, when General Rojo requested that Miaja name commanders with energy and capacity for the Campaign of Levante, Romero Giménez was appointed commander of the newly created XIII Corps of the Army. (Added to the Levant Army, it was previously known as the "B" Army Corps) He fought on several fronts against German forces of the Condor Legion fighting alongside the rebels. For his performance fighting motorized divisions of the "Blackshirts" Italian CTV he was awarded his second "Medal of Courage".

As Commander of the 4th Mixed Brigade, and with General Miaja's effective support, he founded and directed a war material factory called "Romero Mechanical Factories", which was dedicated to the production of mortars and ammunition, mines and hand grenades, bombs with aerodynamic design, thermoses, tripods, shields for trenches, spare parts for rifles, machine guns and antitank and antiaircraft guns as well as engine repairs. Work began with the machinery that could be rescued from the Madrid workshop "Mobile Park". During the Siege of Madrid, between 800 and 1,200 people worked around the clock, under constant enemy fire.

Romero Giménez is credited with the invention of the mine that bears his name "Mina Romero", an anti-tank system first used during the Siege of Madrid. It consisted of a large cast iron metal box designed to fragment and produce shrapnel, after the explosion of 15, 35 or 60 kg. of dynamite. The devices were hidden in the floor to burst enemy tanks from below. They detonated by means of copper wires and glass tanks, either manually or automatically. This is a technical innovation which was subsequently applied during World War II.

In the aftermath of the Spanish Civil War, Romero Giménez was tried in absentia and sentenced twice to death by Garrote for fighting against the uprising, and for being a Mason.

== Exile in France and Resistance ==
After the Civil War, Colonel Romero was exiled in France, initially in Clermont-Ferrand, later in Paris. He left Paris. On 12 June 1940, just hours before the German occupation with the intention of embarking the ship SS Champlain. However, the ship was attacked and sunk off the port before he arrived. He settled in Bordeaux, a city also soon to be occupied by the Nazis. There, Romero played a leading role for two years in the Maquis French Resistance, coordinating actions such as disabling the detonators of bombs waiting to be dropped during The Blitz of London and other cities. As a result, many bombs failed to explode once hitting their targets. He also led other sabotage operations such as the disablement of materials intended for the construction of a submarine base, and the piercing of undetectable holes at the bottom of large cans of German military food. This was to make the food expire by the time they reached their destination of the Eastern Front. Romero was arrested by the Gestapo and imprisoned in the medieval prison "Fort du Hâ" in Bordeaux. He was subjected to severe tortures and interrogation and forced to witness the strangulation deaths of other fellow Resistance prisoners. Romero would escape death as a result of a ruse arranged by the French Resistance and the Mayor of Bordeaux. The Mayor issued an official request for Romero to be transferred from the German to the French section of the prison, stating that he had to be processed by a French court, for a (non-existent) civil crime. Once in the French section of prison, the organization rescued Romero. It took nearly a month to physically recover from his torture injuries. He recovered in a hospital located very close to the prison, while using the identity of a dead man. Romero, his wife and daughter were then helped by the Resistance to cross the demarcation line into the 'free' Vichy France. They were all detained the next morning and imprisoned again by the collaborating gendarmerie. Romero was taken to the Gurs concentration camp, where, along with Spanish refugees (including his friend, Lieutenant Colonel Francisco Buzón Llanes) German Jews were interned awaiting to be deported for extermination. He, his wife, and daughter were saved due to the humanitarian proceedings of Gilberto Bosques, Consul of Mexico, distinguished for his outstanding work in helping Spanish refugees, Jews, and other people being persecuted, providing them shelter in that country. Mexico was wide open to receive refugees, especially under the presidency of Lazaro Cardenas del Rio. Overcoming many difficulties they were able to travel to Marseille, where they managed to embark for Oran. Thence the Trans-Saharan train would take them to Casablanca to wait for a ship to take Romero, wife and daughter across the Atlantic.

== Exile in Mexico ==
Colonel Romero finally exiled in Mexico. He, his wife and daughter arrived to the port of Veracruz on 22 May 1942, after nearly a month's cruise aboard the second of three voyages made from Casablanca by the Portuguese ship Nyassa carrying to Mexico large contingents of refugees. In this country Romero re-founded the technical magazine Defensa Nacional (National Defense) with the participation of Spanish military refugees in cooperation with the Mexican Armed Forces. With his children Carmen and Carlos Romero Ortega created a publishing company named 'Sociedad Mexicana de Publicaciones' (Carlos Jr., fighting at a young age for the defense of Madrid was separated by the war from his parents. He obtained political asylum in the Dominican Republic and later in Mexico). Colonel Romero established and directed Maderas Industrializadas y Reconstituidas, a company that pioneered industrialized wood.

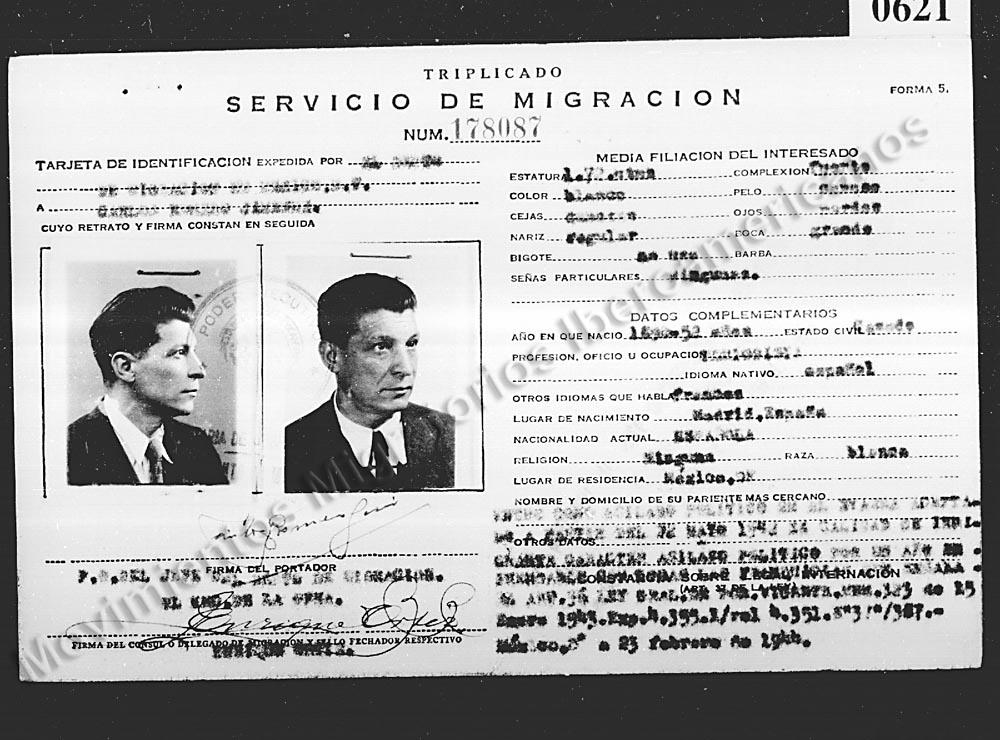
Immigration document as a political refugee in México

After the death of Francisco Franco in 1975, despite having fulfilled all the formalities, Romero was never granted the state pension as a Spanish military veteran. On 11 September 1978 Romero died age 87 in the Sanatorio Español hospital in Mexico City. In fulfilment of his will, his body was cremated, and the ashes divided into two equal parts to be spread to air, water and land, one half in Mexico and the other in Spain. The Spanish scattering took place during a public ceremony at the Bridge of the French.

== Masonry ==
With a late ingress to Masonry in 1932 (being 42 years old) Romero entered Mare Nostrum, Lodge 11, of Madrid, Gran Oriente Español (GOE), (Spanish Grand Orient). He subsequently moved into the Grand Spanish Lodge (GLE, Gran Logia Española) of which Romero became Grand Chief in 1937, and the Governing Council's Great Expert by 1938. In 1939, as Counselor of the Masonic Family, Romero was responsible in France for coordinating support for exiled Masons and Republicans, altogether with the Relief Committee (Comité de Socorros). Spain brutally repressed Masonry, such as sentencing members to death by torture. Lodge files were used by TREMEC Court (Spanish Tribunal for the Repression of Freemasonry and Communism) as 'criminal' evidence, so the fraternity's records that could have been saved from confiscation were hidden or destroyed to save lives.

== Bibliography ==
- Alpert, Michael; El Ejército Republicano en la Guerra Civil (Spanish Republican Army during the Civil War), Siglo XXI de España, Madrid, 1989 ISBN 84-323-0682-7
- Engel, Carlos (1999). Historia de las Brigadas Mixtas del Ejército Popular de la República. (History of Mixed Brigades in the Spanish Popular Army) ISBN 84-922644-7-0.
- Salas Larrazábal, Ramón. Historia del Ejército Popular de la República (History of the Spanish Republic Popular Army). La Esfera de los Libros S.L. ISBN 84-9734-465-0. Editora Nacional, Madrid (España) ISBN 84-276-1107-2
- THOMAS, Hugh, Historia de la Guerra Civil Española (History of the Sapanish Civil War). Círculo de Lectores, Barcelona, 1976. ISBN 84-226-0874-X.
