= 182nd Regiment =

182nd Regiment may refer to:

- 182nd Armored Infantry Regiment "Garibaldi"
- 182nd Field Regiment, Royal Artillery
- 182nd Infantry Regiment (United States)

== American Civil War regiments ==
- 182nd New York Infantry Regiment
- 182nd Ohio Infantry Regiment

== See also ==
- 182nd Brigade (disambiguation)
