= Andoni Imaz =

Spanish footballer

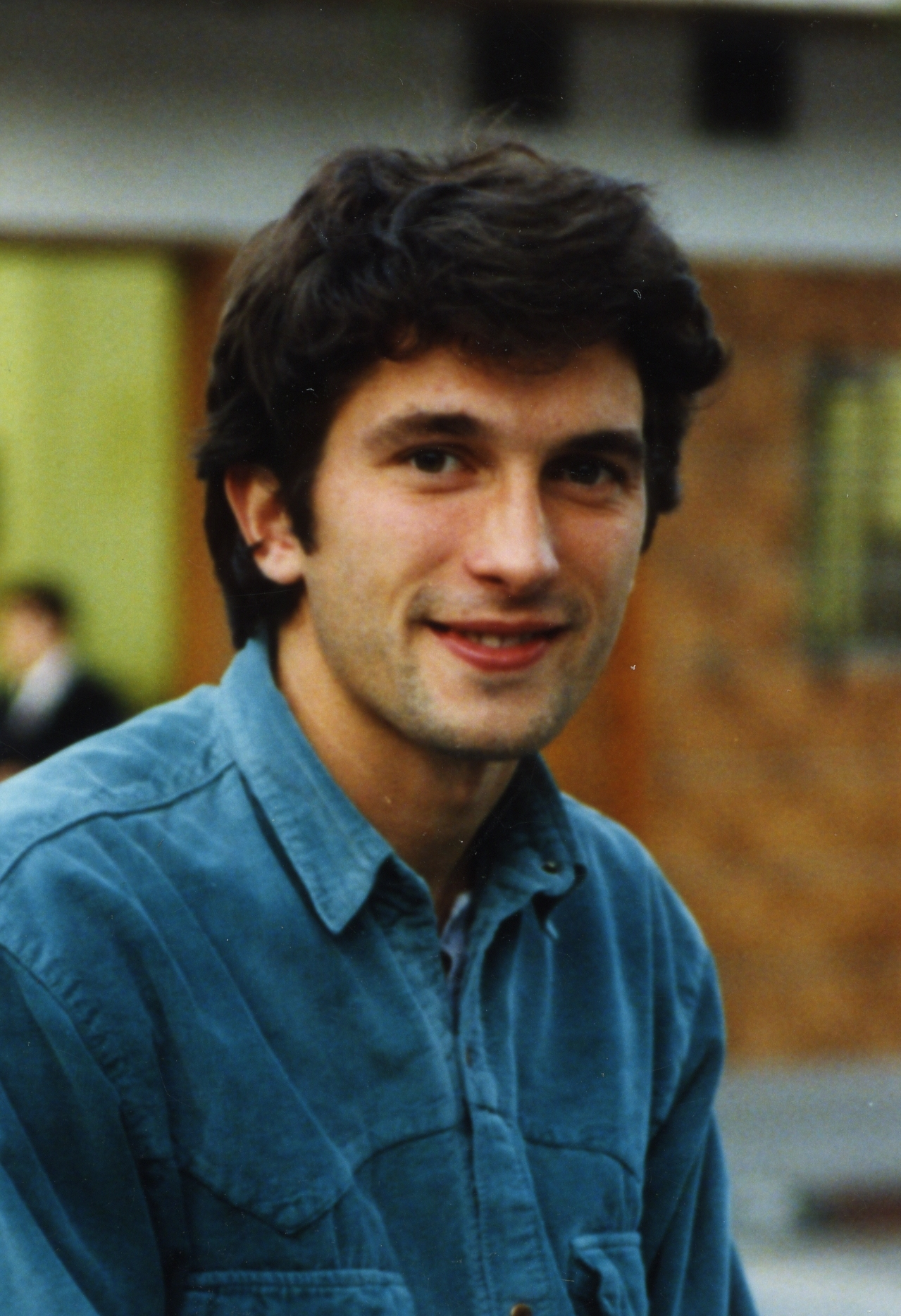
- Imaz in 1994

Personal information
- Full name: Andoni Imaz Garmendia
- Date of birth: 5 September 1971 (age 55)
- Place of birth: Zizurkil, Spain
- Height: 1.77 m (5 ft 10 in)
- Position: Midfielder

Youth career
- Real Sociedad

Senior career*
Years	Team	Apps	(Gls)
1990–1991	Real Sociedad B	31	(0)
1991–1998	Real Sociedad	197	(7)
1998–2002	Athletic Bilbao	28	(1)
Total		256	(8)

International career
1992–1994	Spain U21	13	(0)
1992	Spain U23	1	(0)
1993	Spain	1	(0)
1993–1997	Basque Country	4	(0)
Medal record
Men's football
Representing Spain
UEFA European Under-21 Championship
Bronze medal – third place	1994 France
- * Club domestic league appearances and goals

Andoni Imaz Garmendia (born 5 September 1971) is a Spanish former professional footballer who played as a midfielder.

He appeared in 225 La Liga matches over ten seasons, scoring eight goals for Real Sociedad and Athletic Bilbao. After retiring, he worked with the latter club in directorial capacities.

== Club career ==
=== Real Sociedad ===
Born in Zizurkil, Gipuzkoa, Imaz was immediately thrust into hometown club Real Sociedad's starting XI in La Liga at the age of 20 after a single season in the Segunda División B with the reserves. His debut in the competition took place on 8 September 1991, when he played the entire 0–0 home draw against Real Zaragoza. He scored his first top-division goal on 10 November 1991, helping his team to a 2–2 draw away to Real Valladolid.

Imaz acted as captain in the inaugural match at the Anoeta Stadium, a 2–2 friendly draw with Real Madrid on 13 August 1993. During his spell, he never appeared in less than 26 league games.

=== Athletic Bilbao ===
In the summer of 1998, Imaz opted against renewing his contract and signed with Basque Country neighbours Athletic Bilbao. He helped the Lions to reach the group phase of the 1998–99 UEFA Champions League by netting in the 2–1 away loss against FC Dinamo Tbilisi (eventually qualifying via the away goals rule) then played five times in that stage of the tournament, which ended in elimination in last place.

Having totalled 36 matches over his first two seasons, Imaz was rarely selected after the arrival of manager Txetxu Rojo, meeting the same fate under Jupp Heynckes and retiring at only 30 due to injury problems.

== International career ==
Imaz won one cap for Spain, featuring the full 90 minutes in a 1–1 friendly against Mexico in Las Palmas. He also represented the unofficial Basque Country regional team.

== Post-retirement ==
Imaz engaged in politics following his retirement, running as sports councillor for the Basque Nationalist Party in the town of Tolosa and being elected in 2003. He resigned at the end of a four-year term, claiming he had "had enough".

In 2013, Imaz was appointed as Athletic Bilbao's match delegate, being voted the league's best the following year. He left the position in 2019 to pursue other interests.

== Honours ==
Spain U21

- UEFA European Under-21 Championship third place: 1994
