= Battle of Irún =

Battle of the Spanish Civil War

Coordinates: 43°20′N 1°47′W

- Part of the Spanish Civil War
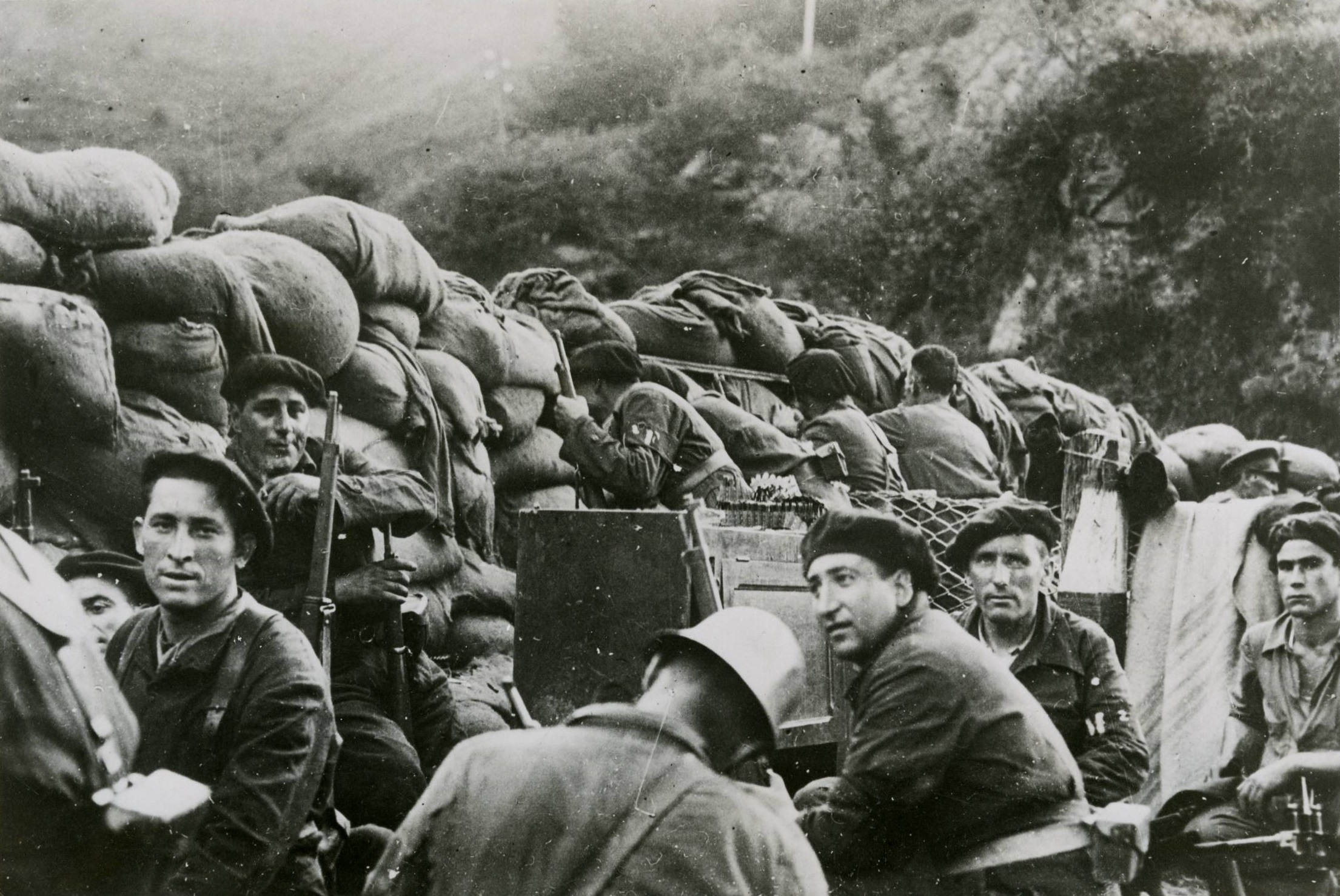
- Armed civilians from the Republican side during the battle
Date	19 August – 5 September 1936
Location	Gipuzkoa, Spain
Result	Nationalist victory

Belligerents
(Spain) Spanish Republic	(Francoist Spain) Nationalists

Commanders and leaders
(Spain) Antonio Ortega (Spain) Manuel Cristóbal Errandonea (Spain) Manuel Margarida Valdes	(Francoist Spain) Emilio Mola (Francoist Spain) Colonel Alfonso Beorlegui Canet † (Francoist Spain) Rafael García Valiño

Strength
Over 2,000–3,000	Over 2,000; A battery of 155 mm guns Some Ju 52 bombers Some Panzer tanks Mark I

Casualties and losses
?	?

The Battle of Irún was the critical battle of the Campaign of Gipuzkoa prior to the War in the North, during the Spanish Civil War. The Nationalist Army, under Alfonso Beorlegui, captured the city of Irún cutting off the northern provinces of Gipuzkoa, Biscay, Santander, and Asturias from their source of arms and support in France.

== Background ==
Irún is located on the northwestern coast of Spain, between the French border and the city of San Sebastián. Navarre, a Carlist stronghold, was taken over by the Requetés in late July, followed by brutal mass-repression against blacklisted civilians. In early August, the Carlists Colonel Jose Solchaga Zala and Colonel Alfonso Beorlegui under the orders of General Mola commanded large numbers of Requetés down the north of Navarre towards Irún.

Colonel Beorlegui's force was smaller, but it included 155 mm artillery, German light tanks, Junkers Ju 52 bombers, and a 700-man bandera from the Spanish Foreign Legion. It also included Italian aircraft. Both Germans and Italians carried out heavy air strikes over Irun and Hondarribia (Fuenterrabía) on a daily basis, at the same time dropping pamphlets over the towns threatening to repeat the massacres of Badajoz.

The town was defended by 3,000 Republicans, including CNT militia, Asturian miners, Basque nationalists, and French communist volunteers. However, they were poorly armed and lacking in proper military training.

== The battle ==
The Nationalist ships España (battleship), Almirante Cervera (cruiser), and Velasco (destroyer) bombarded the town on 11 August. The main fighting took place on the Puntza ridge south of the town. The peak of the battle occurred at the convent of San Marcial, which was defended by Asturian miners and militia who threw dynamite and rocks when they ran out of ammunition.

The French had closed the border with Spain on 8 August, leading to a shortage of ammunition and supplies on the Republican side. When the Republicans finally abandoned the town, anarchist forces in retreat enraged by their lack of ammunition set fire to parts of the town to destroy things that might aid the Nationalists.

On the rebel side, colonel Beorlegui was wounded by a sniper's bullet when he entered the town. He refused to have the wound treated and soon died from gangrene. Thousands of civilians and militias fled in panic for their lives across the Bidasoa border to France as the rebel far-right forces entered the town.

The Nationalist battalions headed then west towards San Sebastián, defended halfway only by the Fort San Marcos.

== See also ==
- Kasilda Hernáez
- Felix Likiniano
- List of Spanish Nationalist military equipment of the Spanish Civil War
- List of Spanish Republican military equipment of the Spanish Civil War

== Sources ==
- Beevor, Antony, The Battle for Spain, New York: Penguin Group, 1982, 526 p.
- Romero, Eladi, Itinerarios de la Guerra Civil española : guía del viajero curioso, Barcelona: Laertes, 2001, 600 p.
- Barruso, Pedro, Verano y revolución. La guerra civil en Gipuzkoa' (julio-septiembre de 1936), Edita: Haramburu Editor. San Sebastián, 1996.
- Pedro Barruso, GIPUZKOA 1936: VERANO Y REVOLUCIÓN, LA GUERRA CIVIL EN GIPUZKOA (Spanish)
- MARCELO USABIAGA: Así fue la batalla de Irun... from RODRIGUEZ, MIKEL: Marcelo Usabiaga: Así fue la Batalla de Irun Historia 16 nº362 (junio 2006), p. 72-85
- Preston, Paul (2013). The Spanish Holocaust: Inquisition and Extermination in Twentieth-Century Spain. London, UK: HarperCollins. ISBN 978-0-00-638695-7.
- Hugh Thomas (2001). The Spanish Civil War. Modern Library. ISBN 0-375-75515-2.
- Aznar, Manuel. Historia Militar de la Guerra de España. 3 vols. Madrid: Editora Nacional, 1969.
