= XVI Army Corps (Spain) =

- XVI Cuerpo de Ejército
- Active: April 30, 1938–March 1939
- Country: Spanish Republic
- Allegiance: (Second Spanish Republic) Republican faction
- Branch: Spanish Republican Army
- Type: Infantry
- Size: Corps
- Garrison/HQ: Tarancón
- Engagements: Spanish Civil War: Battle of Santander; Levante Offensive

Commanders
- Notable commanders: Miguel Palacios Martínez

The XVI Army Corps was a military formation of the Spanish Republican Army that fought in the Spanish Civil War. It had an outstanding performance in the Levante campaign.

== History ==
It was originally created on August 6, 1937, from the old Asturian II Army Corps. The command fell to José Gállego Aragüés. It participated in the Battle of Santander, during which it suffered such losses that it was dissolved.

In April 1938, the XVI Army Corps was recreated again in the downtown area, with its headquarters in Tarancón. Miguel Palacios Martínez took over the command of the unit. He was soon sent to the Levante front, in support of the republican forces that resisted the nationalist offensive that was trying to take Valencia. The XVI Army Corps was located between the XIII and XIX corps, in the Teruel sector. At the beginning of July it faced a renewed offensive in the Teruel sector, suffering considerable casualties. At the climax of the Battle of Levante, the corps integrated the 39th, 48th and 52nd divisions; after the beginning of the Battle of the Ebro the Levante front stabilized. During the rest of the war, the XVI Corps did not intervene in any relevant military operation.

== Command ==
Commanders

- Miguel Palacios Martínez;

Commissars

- Antonio Ejarque Pina, of the CNT;

Chiefs of Staff

- Francisco Arderiu Perales;

== Organization ==
Date	Attached Army	Integrated divisions	Battlefront
August 6, 1937	Northern Army	56th, 57th and 58th	Asturias-Santander
April 30, 1938	GERC	13th, 14th, 48th	Reservation
July 4, 1938	Levantine Army	39th, 48th	Levante
August 1938	Levantine Army	39th, 48th, 52nd	Levante

== Bibliography ==
- Engel, Carlos (1999). Historia de las Brigadas Mixtas del Ejército Popular de la República (in Spanish). Madrid, Almena. ISBN 84-922644-7-0.
- Herrerín López, Ángel (2004). La CNT durante el franquismo: clandestinidad y exilio (1939-1975) (in Spanish). Siglo XXI de España. ISBN 9788432311529.
- Juan Navarro, Ramón (2010). Resistir es vencer. El frente de Viver en la Guerra Civil española (in Spanish). Lulu.com. ISBN 978-1-4466-9664-4.
- Martínez Bande, José Manuel (1972). El final del frente norte (in Spanish). Madrid: Ed. San Martín.
- Martínez Bande, José Manuel (1977). La ofensiva sobre Valencia (in Spanish). Madrid: Editorial San Martín.
