= 175th Brigade =

175th Brigade may refer to:

- 175th Mixed Brigade, Spain
- 175th (2/3rd London) Brigade, United Kingdom
- 175th Medical Brigade, United States

== See also ==
- 175th Regiment (disambiguation)
