= Leopoldo Menéndez =

Spanish military officer

Leopoldo Menéndez López
- Born: Leopoldo Menéndez López; 30 April 1891; Orduña, Biscay, Kingdom of Spain
- Died: 1960 (aged 68–69); Mexico D.F., Mexico
- Military career
- Allegiance: (Restoration (Spain)) Kingdom of Spain (1907–1931) (Second Spanish Republic) Spanish Republic (1931–1939)
- Branch: Regulares; Spanish Army; Spanish Republican Army
- Service years: 1907–1939
- Rank: General
- Commands: Azaña Battalion (1936); XXth Army Corps (1937–1938); Army of Levante (1938–1939)
- Conflicts: Spanish Civil War: Battle of Teruel; Levante Offensive; Final offensive of the Spanish Civil War
- Awards: Royal and Military Order of Saint Hermenegild

Leopoldo Menéndez López (30 April 1891 – 1965) was a Spanish military officer who fought for the Republicans during the Spanish Civil War.

== Biography ==
Before the war, he was an adviser of the prime minister Manuel Azaña. A professional officer of the Spanish Army, he supported the Republican government during the Spanish Civil War. Later he was promoted to Colonel and in the Battle of Teruel, he led the XXth Army Corps. In 1938, he led the Army of Levante in the battle of the XYZ Line. In August 1938 he was promoted to General.

On February 16, 1939, he was one of the officers who said to the prime minister Juan Negrin that was impossible to continue the resistance and in March 1939 he supported Casado's coup. At the end of the war, he fled Spain to France and later he went to exiled in Mexico and died there.
