= Kasilda Hernáez =

Basque anarchist militant

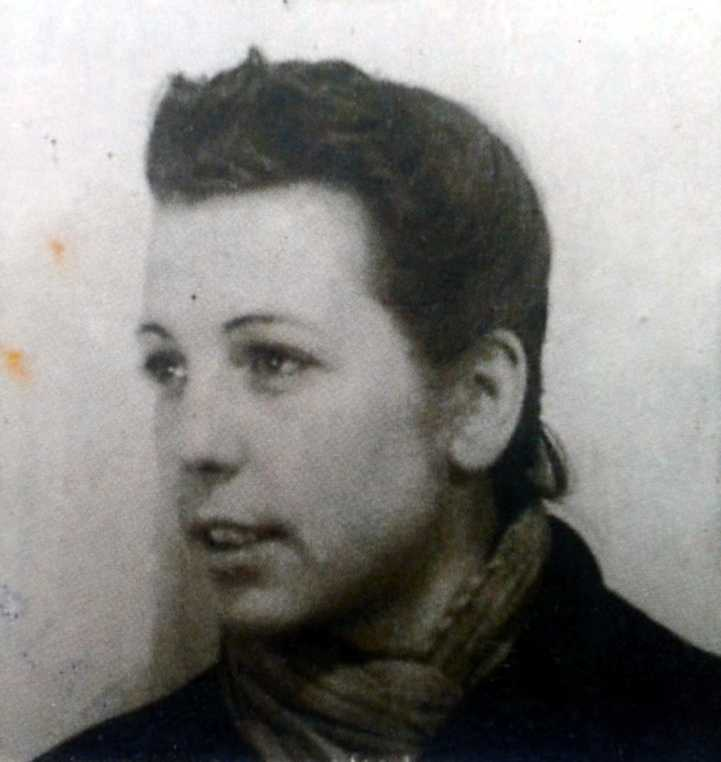
- Kasilda Hernáez (1940s)
- Born: Soledad Kasilda Hernáez Vargas; 9 April 1914; Zizurkil, Gipuzkoa, Spain
- Died: 31 August 1992 (aged 78); Saint-Jean-de-Luz, French Basque Country, France
- Burial place: Biarritz
- Spouse: Felix Likiniano
- Military career
- Allegiance: Spanish Republic; Euskadi
- Service: Confederal militias
- Rank: Lieutenant
- Nicknames: "Kasi" and "La Miliciana"
- Conflicts: Spanish Civil War: Battle of Irun; Battle of Euskadi; Battle of Aragon; Battle of the Ebro; Battle of Catalonia; World War II: French Resistance

Soledad Kasilda Hernáez Vargas (9 April 1914 – 31 August 1992) was a Basque anarchist militant who fought in the Spanish Civil War. An anarchist from an early age, during the time of the Spanish Republic, she was a prominent participant in the Basque anarchist movement, being imprisoned for her role in the Revolution of 1934. With the outbreak of civil war, she fought within the confederal militias, transferring to the Aragon front after the nationalists won the War in the North. After the Republic's defeat, she went into exile in France, where she supported the French Resistance, Spanish Maquis and eventually ETA.

== Biography ==
Hernáez was born to an unmarried mother and unknown father in the Fraisoro de Zizurkil cradle house. Her grandmother was a calé, and her anarchist uncles influenced her early libertarian initiation. She grew up in the San Sebastián neighbourhood of Egia, where she learned to read and write at the Atocha public school.

Following the proclamation of the Second Spanish Republic, she joined the Libertarian Youth and attended the libertarian athenaeums, which became a second school for her. She was briefly arrested for calling for a strike in a company whose workforce was made up of women. Her practice of nudism on Zurriola beach also caused a scandal at the time. Her intense participation in the Revolution of 1934 led to her being arrested and sentenced by a military tribunal to nine years in prison for distributing propaganda and twenty more for possession of explosives. She was imprisoned in the fort of Nuestra Señora de Guadalupe and later transferred to the Ventas women's prison in Madrid. But after two years of imprisonment, she was released thanks to the general amnesty granted by the Popular Front following the 1936 Spanish general election.

Shortly after her release from prison, she met the anarchist militant Felix Likiniano, who was to become her lifelong companion, and became sympathetic to the Mujeres Libres group, created the same year, although she did not become a member.

After the outbreak of the Spanish Civil War in July 1936, she joined an anti-Francoist militia, taking part in the defence of San Sebastián and the battle of Irun. Following the fall of Euskadi, she transferred to the Levante and fought within the Hilario-Zamora column on the Aragon and Ebro fronts. After the fall of Catalonia, she went into exile with Likiniano in France, where they were detained in the Argelès and Gurs concentration camps until the summer of 1940. Once free, they moved to Bordeaux. Their domicile served as a centre of resistance against Francoism and Nazism, and was known as the "Basque Consulate".

Years later, after the weakening of the anarchist movement, the couple came to support the Basque National Liberation Movement and the armed organisation Euskadi ta Askatasuna (ETA). However, the relationship between Kasilda and Felix cooled and she fell into a depressive state from which she would later recover.

Hernáez died of cancer in Saint-Jean-de-Luz, France, on 31 August 1992. She is buried together with Felix Likiniano in the cemetery of Biarritz. On her tombstone, her friend Begoña Gorospe inscribed the phrase "Woman, you are the fire that does not go out!" (Basque: Andra! Zu zera bukatzen ez den sua!).

== Recognition ==
In 1985, Luis María Jiménez de Aberásturi published the biography Casilda, miliciana: historia de un sentimiento.

In 2021, the theatre group Goitibera premiered Kasilda, bukatzen ez den sua, a play in her honour.

In 2022 the documentary Casilda, el eco de otros pasos, by director Juan Felipe, deals with the figure of Hernáez. This year also saw the publication of the graphic novel Casilda revolucionaria by Rubén Uceda Villanueva, which narrates her life in the first person.
