= Kibu Vicuña =

Association football manager

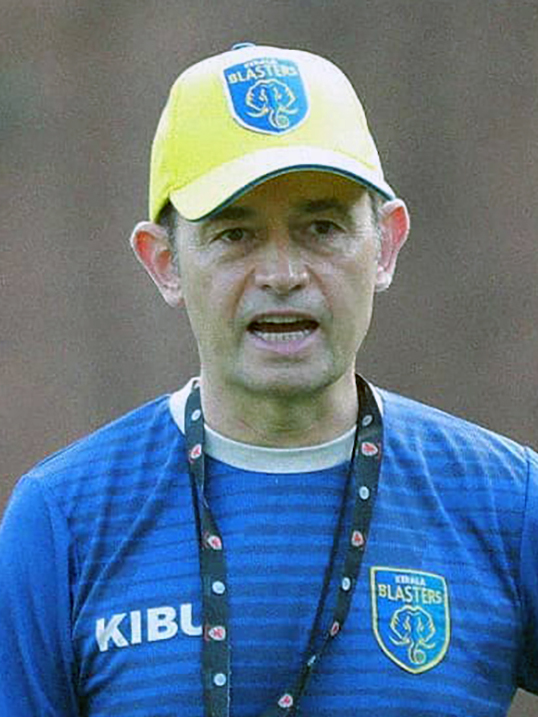
- Vicuña as manager of Kerala Blasters in 2020

Personal information
- Full name: José Antonio Vicuña Ochandorena
- Date of birth: 20 November 1971 (age 54)
- Place of birth: Zizurkil, Spain

Team information
- Current team: Poland (assistant)

Managerial career
- Years: Team
- 2005–2007: River Ega
- 2017–2018: Trakai
- 2018–2019: Wisła Płock
- 2019–2020: Mohun Bagan
- 2020–2021: Kerala Blasters
- 2021–2022: ŁKS Łódź
- 2022: Diamond Harbour
- 2022–2023: Mohammedan
- 2023–2026: Diamond Harbour
- 2026–: Poland (assistant)

José Antonio Vicuña Ochandorena (born 20 November 1971), commonly known as Kibu Vicuña, is a Spanish professional football manager. He is currently the assistant coach of the Poland national team.

== Coaching career ==
=== Early career ===
After playing for the University of Navarra while coaching the youth squads, Vicuña was named in charge of CA Osasuna's youth squads in 2002. He left the club in 2005 to take over Tercera División side CD River Ega, where he coached for two years.

In 2007, after a call to Jan Urban to congratulate his appointment at Legia Warsaw, Vicuña was invited to become his assistant. He subsequently worked as Urban's assistant at Zagłębie Lubin, Legia, Osasuna, Lech Poznań and Śląsk Wrocław.

=== Trakai ===
Oleg Vasilenko was fired from Lithuanian club Trakai in May 2018, and Vicuña appointed as the head coach of the club in June. He worked with the team in the Europa League tournament, but left in October and went to Wisła Płock.

=== Wisła Płock ===
On 10 October 2018, Vicuña was appointed as head coach of Polish club Wisła Płock. He left the club on 3 April 2019 after managing the team in 19 games.

=== Mohun Bagan ===
In May 2019, Vicuña signed a one-year deal for Mohun Bagan. He won the I-League in his maiden season with Mohun Bagan. After the alignment of ATK and Mohun Bagan, the new management chose ATK head coach Antonio López Habas as the manager of the new entity, and Kibu's contract was not extended.

=== Kerala Blasters ===
On 22 April 2020, Vicuña was appointed as head coach of Kerala Blasters. After a disappointing season with only 3 wins from 18 games, the Blasters and Kibu Vicuna decided to part away on mutual consent. He left the club on 17 February 2021, with two more games remaining in the season.

=== ŁKS Łódź ===
On 21 June 2021, it was announced that Vicuña was appointed as head coach of the I liga club ŁKS Łódź for the 2021–22 I liga season. On 7 March 2022, two games after the winter break, with the team sitting ninth in the table, Vicuña was relieved of his duties.

=== Mohammedan ===
In December 2022, during the midway of 2022–23 I-League season, Vicuña was roped in as new head coach of another Kolkata-based club Mohammedan Sporting in place of Andrey Chernyshov. He returned to I-League, after managing the newly formed Calcutta Football League club Diamond Harbour. He parted ways with the club on 21 February 2023.

== Personal life ==
Born in Zizurkil, Basque Country to a business family which owns a steel factory in the town, Vicuña opted to work with football instead. His parents are from San Sebastián, and his brothers are from Pamplona, city where he arrived at the age of nine. Vicuña's wife, Kasia Bielecka, is Polish.

When asked in an interview about his relationship with current Qatar national team coach Julen Lopetegui, Vicuña said: "He is a bit senior to me and a good friend of my elder brother, Marcelino. Actually, his parents and my parents were friends. They used to travel together during vacations. When he was in charge of FC Porto, I went to Porto and watched his style of coaching from close for two weeks. When he was in charge of the Spanish national team, then also we used to talk about a lot of things almost regularly. After I came here (India), he wanted to know about the interest level about the game here".

== Managerial statistics ==
As of match played 23 May 2026

Managerial record by team and tenure
Team	Nat	From	To	Record					Ref
Team	Nat	From	To	G	W	D	L	Win %	Ref
FK Riteriai	(Lithuania)	18 June 2018	9 October 2018	15	7	5	3	46.67	
Wisła Płock	(Poland)	10 October 2018	3 April 2019	19	4	5	10	21.05	
Mohun Bagan	(India)	1 June 2019	21 April 2020	21	16	3	2	76.19	
Kerala Blasters	(India)	22 April 2020	17 February 2021	18	3	7	8	16.67	
ŁKS Łódź	(Poland)	21 June 2021	7 March 2022	23	8	8	7	34.78	
Mohammedan	(India)	24 December 2022	21 February 2023	9	2	3	4	22.22	
Diamond Harbour	(India)	11 May 2023	15 July 2026	49	35	8	6	71.43	
Total				154	75	39	40	48.70	—

== Honours ==
Mohun Bagan

- I-League: 2019–20

Diamond Harbour

- Indian Football League: 2025–26
- I-League 2: 2024–25
- I-League 3: 2024–25
