= Felix Likiniano =

Basque anarchist (1909–1982)

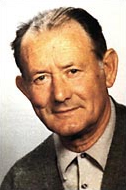
- Born: Felix Likiniano Heriz; 14 January 1909; Eskoriatza, Gipuzkoa, Spain
- Died: 22 December 1982 (aged 73); Biarritz, Iparralde, France
- Spouse: Kasilda Hernáez
- Military career
- Allegiance: Spanish Republic; Euskadi
- Service: Confederal militias
- Rank: Lieutenant
- Nickname: Liki
- Conflicts: Spanish Civil War: War in the North; World War II: French Resistance

Felix Likiniano Heriz (1909–1982), also known as Liki, was a Basque anarchist that fought in the Spanish Civil War, French Resistance and with the Spanish Maquis, before becoming involved with Euskadi Ta Askatasuna (ETA) during the 1960s.

== Biography ==
Likiniano fought in the Spanish Civil War, and during the first moments of the military uprising he played a key role in the defence of Donostia, cutting off the coup's advance through Urbieta Street in the centre of the city where the confederal militias' checkpoints were stationed. Later, when Augusto Pérez Garmendia's column, which had gone out to defend Gasteiz, returned from Eibar, they made the rebels retreat to the Loiola barracks. Later, in the attack on the Loyola barracks, Likiniano led the assault on the arms depots. During the following months, he took part in the defence of the border between Gipuzkoa and Navarre and, after Donostia fell into the hands of the Nationalists, he continued armed resistance in Aragon and Catalonia. He later went to France and participated the French resistance to the Nazi occupation, before returning to Euskadi again, where he was involved in the guerrilla activities of the Spanish Maquis.

In the 1960s, he met and assisted members of Euskadi Ta Askatasuna (ETA), then incipient, and designed the axe and snake anagram that was later used by them. He died in December 1982 and is buried together with his partner Kasilda Hernaez in the Biarritz cemetery. His vision of unifying anarchism with Basque nationalism, shared with his life-long friend Federico Krutwig, was recognized in the early 1990s by autonomous activists of Bilbao, who created a cultural association that bears his name (Felix Likiniano Kultur Elkartea). This organization broke up in 2006.
