= 182nd =

182nd is the ordinal form of the number 182. 182nd or One hundred and eighty-second may also refer to:

- A fraction, 1/182, equal to one of 182 equal parts

== Military ==
- 182nd Brigade (disambiguation)
- 182nd Division
- 182nd Regiment (disambiguation)

== See also ==
- July 1, 182nd day of the year in a standard year
