= 180th Street =

180th Street may refer to:

- 180th Street (IRT Third Avenue Line)
- 180th Street – Bronx Park (IRT White Plains Road Line)
- East 180th Street (IRT White Plains Road Line)
