= Puente de los Franceses (Madrid) =

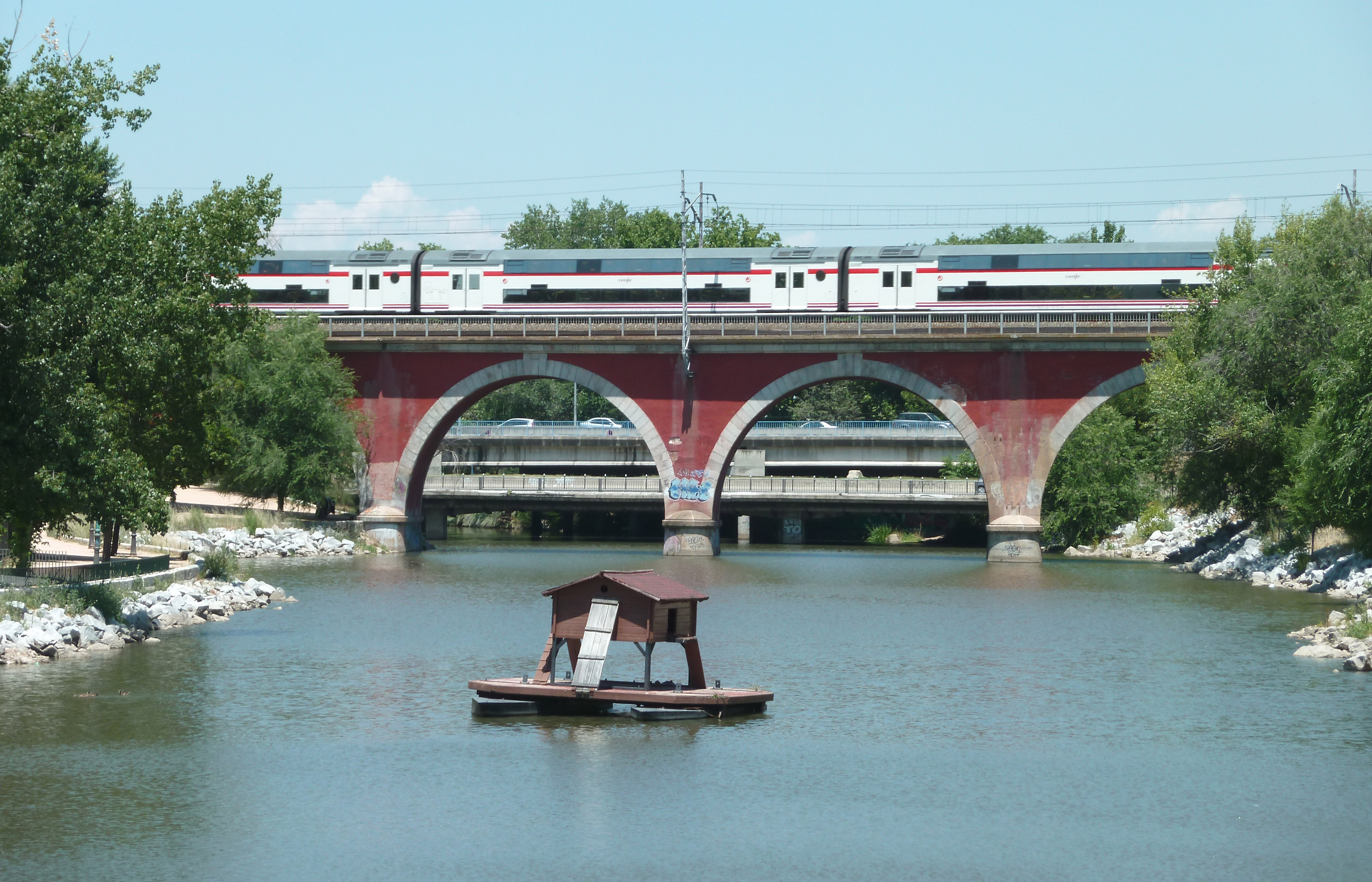
- South side of the bridge
- Coordinates: 40°26′01″N 3°44′09″W
- Carries: Commuter rail
- Crosses: Manzanares
- Locale: Madrid, Spain
- Next upstream: Puente de San Fernando
- Next downstream: Puente de la Reina Victoria (Madrid)

Characteristics
- Design: Arch bridge
- Material: Brick and granite
- No. of spans: 5

History
- Constructed by: Compañía de los Caminos de Hierro del Norte de España
- Built: 1860-1862

Location
- Interactive map of Puente de los Franceses

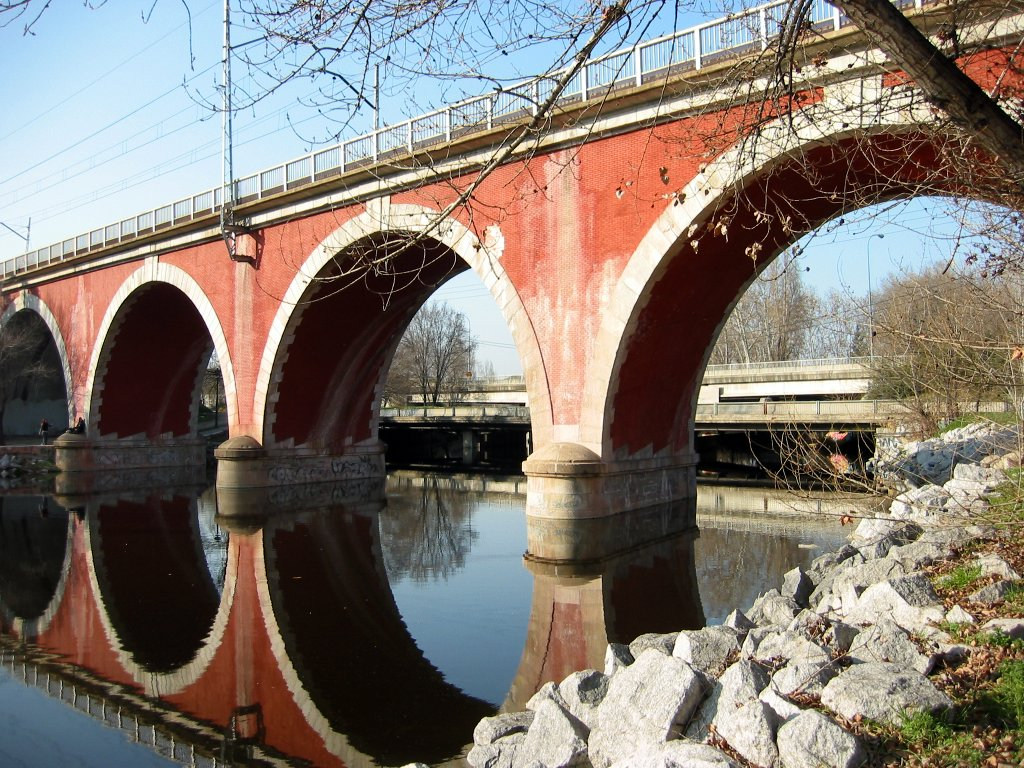
Puente de los Franceses, across the River Manzanares.

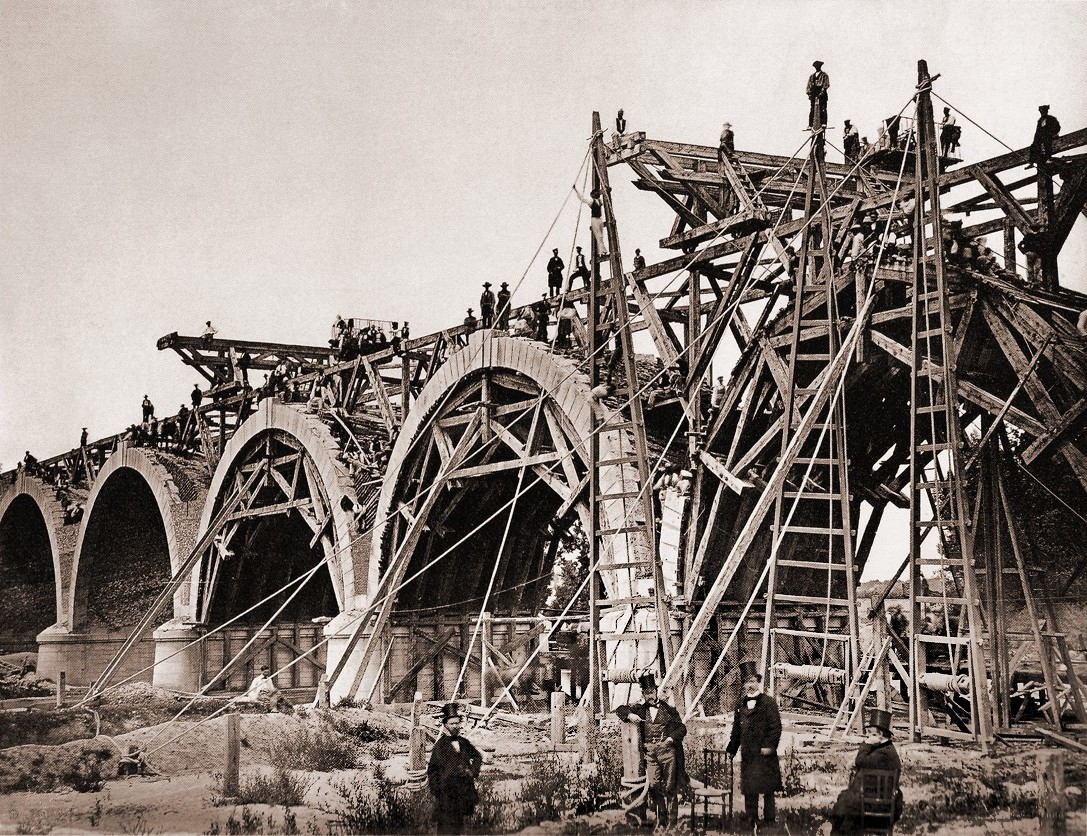
Construction of Puente de los Franceses, 1859.

The Puente de los Franceses (Bridge of the Frenchmen) railway viaduct is located in Madrid, Spain. Comprising five semi-circular brick skew arches, it was built in the second half of the 19th century to carry the railway line from the north (Madrid - Venta de Baños - Irun) across the River Manzanares.

== Toponymy ==
The bridge is named after the nationality of the engineers who devised the project, who were of French origin. The bridge is also known as the French Bridge.

== History ==
The bridge was built between 1860 and 1862, along with other construction work on the railway line to the north, which began in 1856, by the Compañía de los Caminos de Hierro del Norte de España.
