= 175th Street =

175th Street may refer to the following stations of the New York City Subway:

- 174th–175th Streets (IND Concourse Line), in the Bronx; serving the B and D trains
- 175th Street (IND Eighth Avenue Line), in Manhattan; also known as 175th Street – George Washington Bridge Bus Terminal; serving the A train
