= Zizurkil =

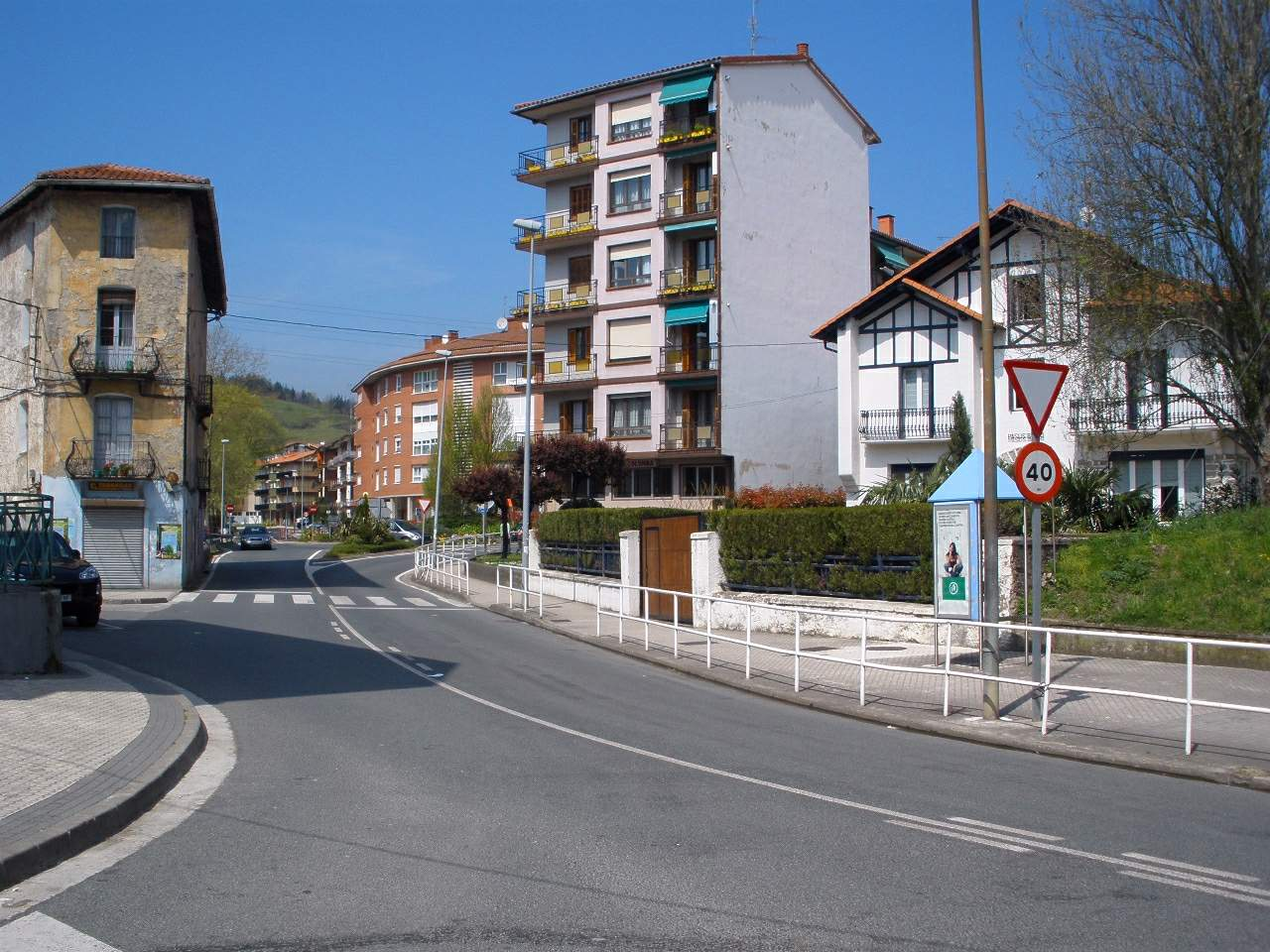
- Street in Zizurkil

- Coat of arms

- Location of Zizurkil within the Basque Country
- Coordinates: 43°11′57″N 2°04′27″W
- Country: Spain
- Autonomous Community: Basque Country
- Province: Gipuzkoa
- Comarca: Tolosaldea

Government
  - Mayor: Jose Maria Luengo Zapirain

Area
  - Total: 15.61 km^{2} (6.03 sq mi)
- Elevation: 115 m (377 ft)

Population (2025-01-01)
  - Total: 2,976
  - Density: 190.6/km^{2} (493.8/sq mi)
- Time zone: UTC+1 (CET)
  - Summer (DST): UTC+2 (CEST)
- Postal code: 20159
- Website: www.zizurkil.eus

Zizurkil (Spanish, Cizúrquil) is a town located in the province of Gipuzkoa, in the Autonomous Community of Basque Country, northern Spain.

== Notable people ==
- Kasilda Hernáez, republican anarchist militant who fought in the Spanish Civil War
- Kibu Vicuña, professional football manager
