= 181st Division =

181st Division may refer to:

- 181st Armed Police Division, People's Republic of China
- 181st Infantry Division (Wehrmacht), Germany
- 181st Rifle Division, Soviet Union

== See also ==
- List of military divisions by number
- 181st Brigade (disambiguation)
- 181st Regiment (disambiguation)
- 181st (disambiguation)
