= Monterrubio =

- Municipality
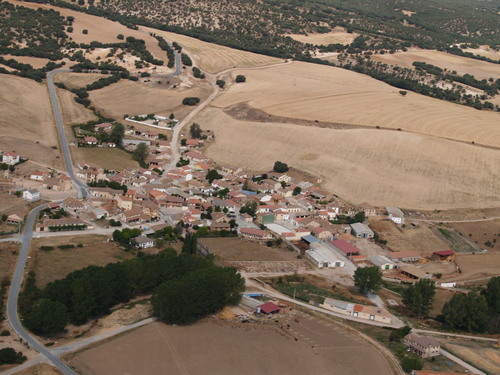
- Monterrubio, a village of Spain.

- Flag Coat of arms

- Location in Spain. Monterrubio (Spain)
- Coordinates: 40°50′55″N 4°21′03″W
- Country: Spain
- Autonomous community: Castile and León
- Province: Segovia
- Municipality: Monterrubio

Area
  - Total: 25 km^{2} (9.7 sq mi)

Population (2025-01-01)
  - Total: 51
  - Density: 2.0/km^{2} (5.3/sq mi)
- Time zone: UTC+1 (CET)
  - Summer (DST): UTC+2 (CEST)
- Website: Official website

Monterrubio is a municipality located in the province of Segovia, Castile and León, Spain. According to the 2004 census (INE), the municipality has a population of 80.
