= 181st Brigade =

181st Brigade may refer to:

- 181st Mixed Brigade, Spain
- 181st (2/6th London) Brigade, United Kingdom
- 181st Infantry Brigade (United States)

== See also ==
- 181st Division (disambiguation)
- 181st Regiment (disambiguation)
