= 175th Regiment =

175th Regiment may refer to:

- 175th Field Regiment, Royal Artillery
- 175th Heavy Anti-Aircraft Regiment, Royal Artillery
- 175th Infantry Regiment (United States)

== American Civil War regiments ==
- 175th New York Infantry Regiment
- 175th Ohio Infantry Regiment
- 175th Pennsylvania Infantry Regiment

== See also ==
- 175th Brigade (disambiguation)
