= 180th Brigade =

180th Brigade may refer to:

- 180th Mixed Brigade, Spain
- 180th (2/5th London) Brigade, United Kingdom

== See also ==
- 180th Regiment (disambiguation)
