= 180th Regiment =

180th Regiment may refer to:

- 180th Cavalry Regiment, United States (previously the 180th Infantry Regiment)
- 180th Field Regiment, Royal Artillery, Britain
- 180th Guards Fighter Aviation Regiment, Soviet Union
- 180th Ohio Infantry Regiment, Union Army

== See also ==
- 180th Brigade (disambiguation)
