= 182nd Brigade =

182nd Brigade may refer to:

- 182nd Mixed Brigade, Spain
- 182nd (2nd Warwickshire) Brigade, United Kingdom

== See also ==
- 182nd Regiment (disambiguation)
