= Levantine Army =

Spanish Republican Army unit in the Spanish Civil War

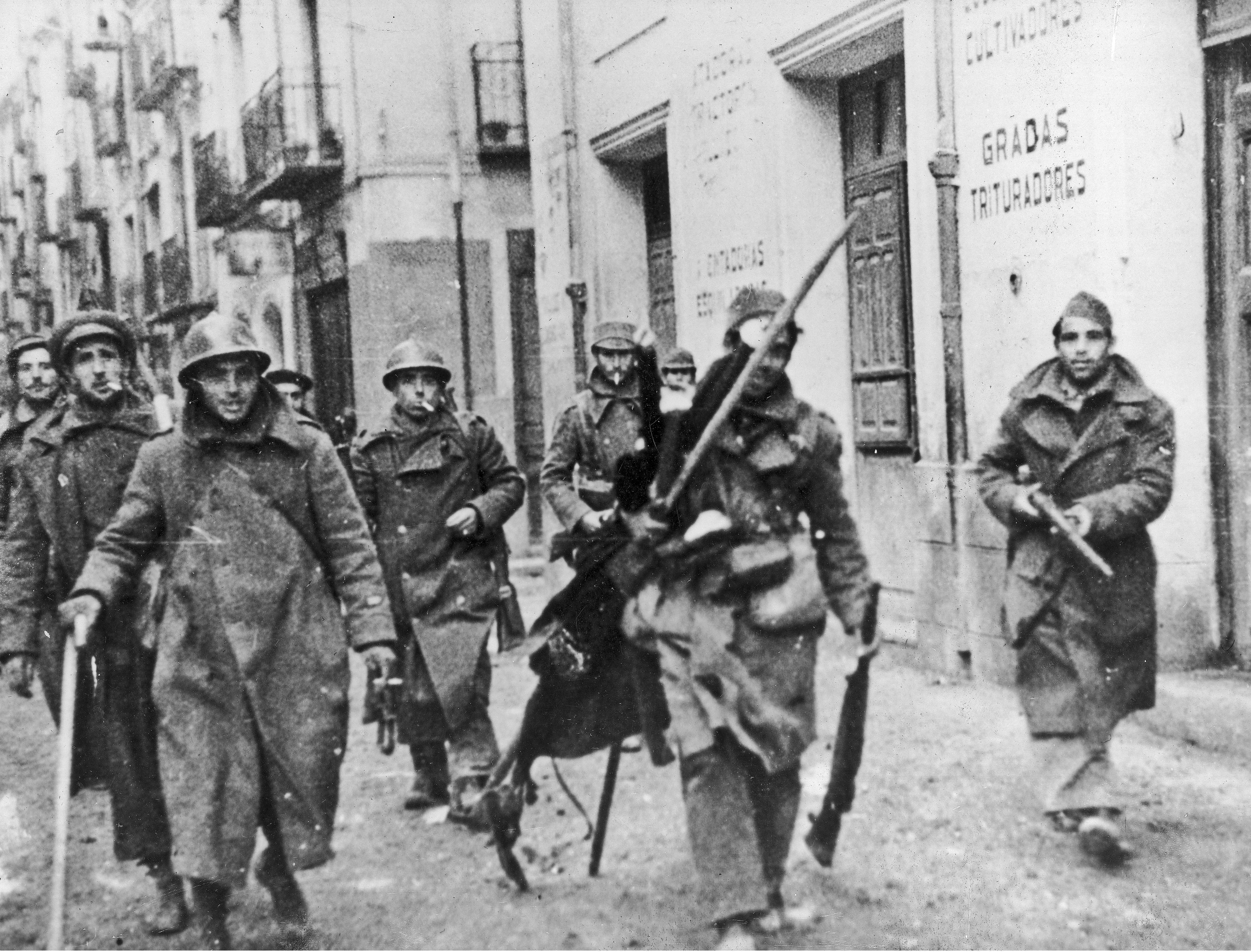
Republican soldiers in the streets of Teruel, during the conquest of the city.

The Levantine Army was a unit of the Spanish Republican Army that operated during the Spanish Civil War. Under its jurisdiction were the Republican forces originally deployed on the Teruel front and, later, on the Levante front. It played an important role during the Battle of Teruel and the Levante Offensive.

== History ==
The Levante Army was created on 19 August 1937 from the XIII and XIX Army Corps, which became part of it. Colonel Juan Hernández Saravia assumed command of the new formation. The lines of the Levante Army went from Rillo to the Sierra de Calomarde and Frías de Albarracín, covering various sectors of the Teruel front.

In December 1937, the Levante Army was in charge of the Republican offensive in Teruel, which would manage to conquer the capital of Teruel after an intense fight. This earned Hernández Saravia the promotion to General. However, this initial victory would end up turning into defeat with the Nationalist counteroffensive, which recovered the city of Teruel.

Beginning in April 1938, the Levantine Army faced the Nationalist offensive on the Levante front, which aimed to conquer Valencia. Also on that date, the formation was assigned to the newly formed Central Region Army Group (GERC), under the supreme command of General José Miaja. In June 1938, the Levante Army absorbed the forces of the Maneuver Army. From that moment on, the unit had 5 Army Corps in line, and another in reserve. In addition, Colonel Leopoldo Menéndez López assumed command of the unit, replacing Juan Hernández Saravia.

The fighting on the Levante front was very intense between the months of April and July 1938. Castellón de la Plana fell into Franco's hands on 14 June, which left Franco's forces about 80 kilometers from Valencia. At that time, up to 6 Army Corps belonging to the Levantine Army were in line, protected by the defenses of the XYZ line. The fighting in Levante reached a climax between 18 and 23 July, during which the Nationalist attackers suffered numerous casualties. The Ebro offensive undertaken further north by the Army of the Ebro stopped all Nationalist attacks.

After being overrun in the Final offensive of the Spanish Civil War, the Levantine Army dissolved itself at the end of March 1939, coinciding with the end of the war.

== Leaders ==
=== Commanders ===
- artillery colonel Juan Hernandez Saravia (24/8/1937 - 2/6/1938);
- infantry colonel Leopoldo Menéndez López (2/6/1938 – 28/3/1939);

=== Commissars ===
- Thomas Mora Saenz, PSOE;
- Francisco Ortega Jimenez, PCE;
- Jose Ignatius Mantecon, IR;

=== Chiefs of Staff ===
- Lieutenant Colonel Eduardo Saenz de Aranaz;
- lieutenant colonel Federico de la Iglesia Navarro;

== Sources ==
- Alpert, Michael (2013). Cambridge University Press (ed.). The Republican Army in the Spanish Civil War, 1936-1939.
- Álvarez, Santiago (1989). Ediciós do Castro (ed.). Los comisarios políticos en el Ejército Popular de la República.
- Beevor, Antony (2005). Editorial Crítica (ed.). La Guerra civil española.
- Cardona, Gabriel (2006). Flor del Viento Ediciones (ed.). Historia militar de una guerra civil. Estrategias y tácticas de la guerra de España.
- Corral, Pedro (2005). DeBolsillo (ed.). Si me quieres escribir. La batalla de Teruel. ISBN 84-9793-626-4.
- Engel, Carlos (1999). Almena (ed.). Historia de las Brigadas Mixtas del Ejército Popular de la República. 84-922644-7-0.
- Martínez Bande, José Manuel (1973). Editorial San Martín (ed.). La Gran ofensiva sobre Zaragoza.
- Martínez Bande, José Manuel (1977). Editorial San Martín (ed.). La ofensiva sobre Valencia.
- Suero Roca, M.ª Teresa (1981). Ed. Península Ibérica (ed.). Militares republicanos de la Guerra de España. ISBN 84-297-1706-4.
- Thomas, Hugh (1976). Círculo de Lectores (ed.). Historia de la Guerra Civil Española. ISBN 84-226-0874-X.
- Zaragoza, Cristóbal (1983). Ed. Planeta (ed.). Ejército Popular y Militares de la República, 1936-1939.
