= XYZ Line =

Spanish Civil War fortifications protecting Valencia

Coordinates: 39.9333°N 0.5667°W

- Part of the Spanish Civil War
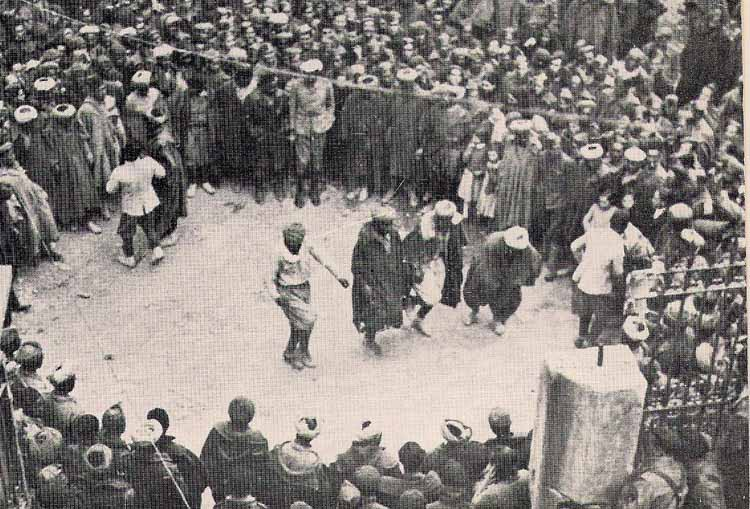
- Nationalist Moroccan troops in Rubielos de Mora, 1938.
Date	18–24 July 1938
Location	East Central Spain
Result	Republican victory: Battle of the Ebro

Belligerents
Spanish Republic	Nationalist Spain; Italy; Germany

Commanders and leaders
(Second Spanish Republic) General Leopoldo Menéndez Lopez (Second Spanish Republic) Colonel Carlos Romero (Second Spanish Republic) Colonel Ernesto Güemes (Second Spanish Republic) Colonel Gustavo Duran	(Spain) José Solchaga (Spain) José Enrique Varela (Spain) Rafael Garcia Valiño; Mario Berti

Strength
125,000	125,000; 900-1,000 cannons 400 aircraft

Casualties and losses
5,000	20,000

The XYZ Line (Spanish: Línea XYZ), also known as the Matallana Line, was a system of fortifications built in 1938 during the Spanish Civil War to defend Valencia, the capital of the Second Spanish Republic. The XYZ Line was a simple system of trenches and bunkers, built to withstand heavy artillery or 450-kilogram (992 lb) aerial bombs, and took advantage of some of the most difficult terrain in Spain in the Iberian System ranges to the north and northeast of Valencia. The XYZ Line was successful at halting the Nationalist advance on Valencia, being one of the last Republican victories of the war, and allowed the Republicans to start the Battle of the Ebro.

== Background ==
Following the success of the Aragon Offensive in April 1938, the Nationalist armies reached the Mediterranean Sea and split the Second Spanish Republic in two. The Spanish Republican Army was in disarray and the road to Barcelona was open for conquest by the Nationalists. Even General Vicente Rojo Lluch said that Barcelona could have been taken with "less force and in less time" than in January 1939.

The Nationalist's German and Italian allies expected a swift attack against Barcelona. Nevertheless, Nationalist leader Francisco Franco decided to turn south against the city of Valencia, the capital of the Republic at the time. Following the recent Anschluss, Franco feared that an advance on Barcelona could prompt France to intervene in Catalonia. Furthermore, he did not want a swift end to the war, but a war of annihilation against the Republic to crush all opposition. Dionisio Ridruejo said, "A long war meant total victory. Franco chose the crueller option which, from his point of view, was also more effective."

=== Nationalist offensive ===
The Nationalist offensive started on 25 April, with General José Enrique Varela's Army Corps of Castille, Antonio Aranda's Galician corps, and Garcia Valiño's formation, but the advance was halted on 27 April. On 1 May, the Nationalists continued their offensive, advancing on three fronts: Varela from Teruel, Aranda along the Mediterranean coast, and Garcia Valiño in a central column moving between them through the mountains.

The Nationalists found it slow going due to rainy weather in March and April that slowed the offensive. The difficult terrain of the Maestrazgo aided the Republican forces, driving back the Nationalists with their strong defensive positions and determination. The Republicans had been reinforced with new weapons brought in from France: Soviet Supermosca (I-16 Type 10) fighters with four machine-guns, 40 Grumman FF fighters and anti-aircraft guns. On 13 June, Castellón fell to Garcia Valiño's corps after several days of fighting, but they were halted short of Sagunto, where the mountains of the Sierra de Espadán came close to the sea. With the fall of Castellón, the Nationalists had a Mediterranean harbor into which munitions and food could be brought to their troops in this front.

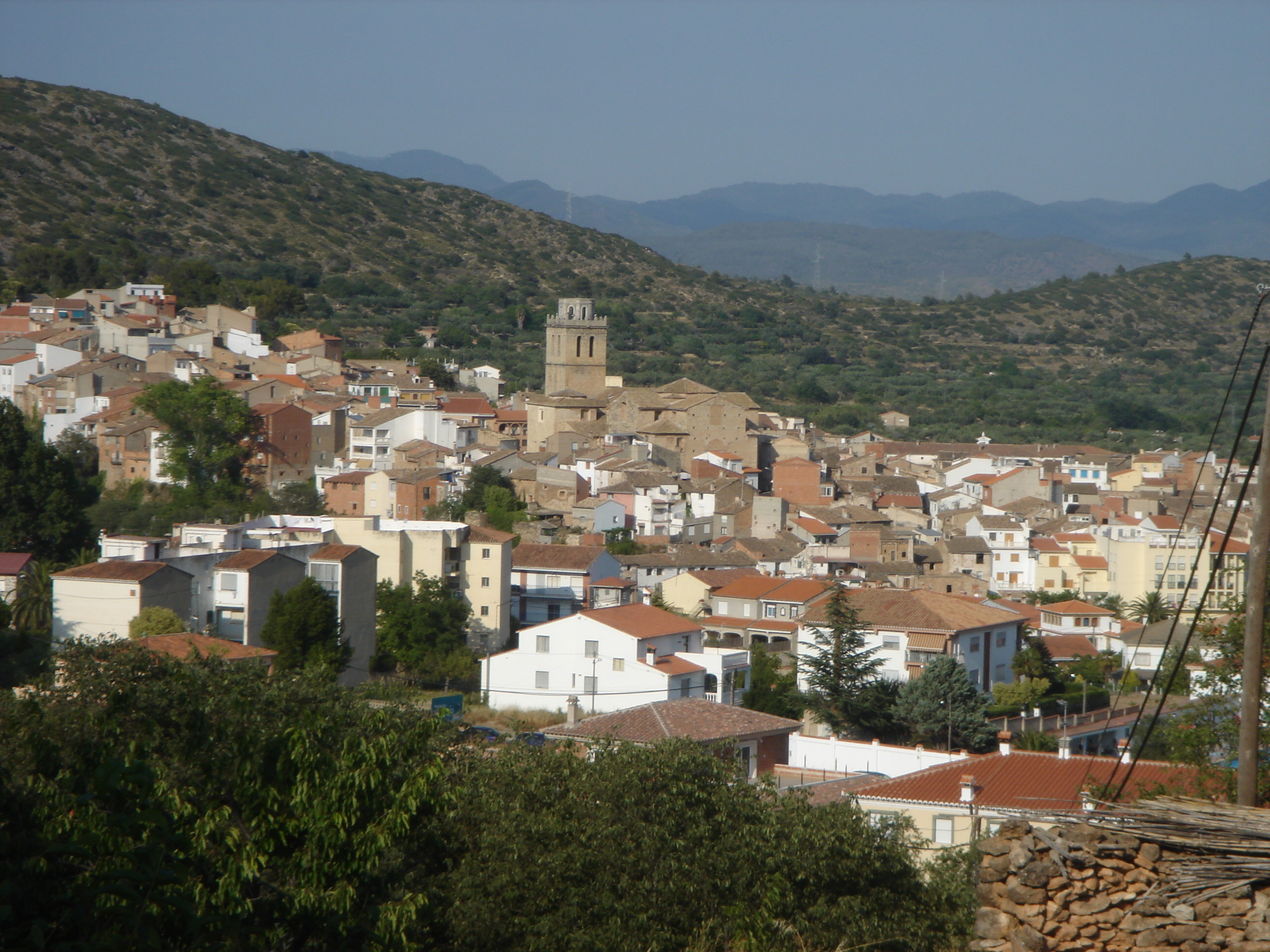
A view of Viver.

The Nationalists were surprised by the resistance of the Republican forces, and General Alfredo Kindelán tried to persuade Franco to abandon the operation. The German Condor Legion was exhausted and was eventually withdrawn from the front. Nevertheless, Franco ordered the attack to be continued, and that Valencia be captured by 25 July. By the beginning of July, the Nationalists reinforced the front with three divisions of the Italian Corpo Truppe Volontarie (CTV) led by General Mario Berti, and four divisions of General José Solchaga's Turia Corps. Furthermore, the Nationalists had nine hundred cannons and four hundred aircraft in this front, and had just received about 50 Italian medium bombers (BR.20, SM.79, SM.81). Opposing the Nationalists, the Republicans had the six army corps (Palacio's XVI Corps, Garcia Vallejo's XVII, Vidal's XIX, Duran's XX and Ibarrola's XXII, as well as Güemes's Group A and Romero's Group B) of General Leopoldo Menéndez's Army of the Levante.

On 5 July, Garcia Valiño attacked from Castellón, but he was stopped by the Republican forces led by Colonel Duran and General Menendez at the Sierra de Espadan. The final push of the Nationalist offensive began on 13 July. To the west, Solchaga's corps moved south from Teruel with Varela's corps and the CTV on their flank to the east, and the Garcia Valiño formation tried to advance down the coast. After some determined resistance at Mora de Rubielos and Sarrion, the Republican line in the Sierra del Toro crumbled. The Nationalists then advanced 97 kilometres (60 mi) along a front 32 kilometres (20 mi) wide until they were stopped by the XYZ Line fortifications running east and west from Viver into the Sierra de Espadan.

== Battle ==
Between 18 and 23 July, the defenses of the XYZ Line, held by two Republican corps led by Colonels Ernesto Güemes and Carlos Romero, were successful in halting the Nationalist advance. Republican positions were well-placed and entrenched which gave them a major tactical advantage over the Nationalists. Machine gun nests were set up to crossfire to easily repel assaults. Many positions were hidden which made them difficult to detect, and therefore difficult to call in artillery or for aircraft to bomb them. Waves of infantry and intense bombing raids were used to try break the Republican lines, but the defenders' use of well planned trenches and protected lines of communication were able to inflict heavy casualties on the Nationalists (about 20,000 casualties) while suffering relatively few themselves (only 5,000 casualties). The Nationalist offensive had halted less than 40 km from Valencia.

On 24 July, the Republicans launched an offensive in the north, the Battle of the Ebro, which prevented any further assaults on the line by drawing away eight Nationalist divisions and their heavy artillery.

== Aftermath ==
According to Beevor, the defense of the XYZ Line was a far greater victory for the Republic than the Battle of Guadalajara. The Nationalists occupied the province of Castellón, but failed to occupy Valencia and suffered heavy casualties. The Republican Army had time to reorganize, and to plan their assault across the River Ebro. Furthermore, the Republican forces in Catalonia had time to rearm with the weapons received across the France–Spain border, reopened in March.

== Sources ==
- Beevor, Antony. The Battle for Spain. The Spanish Civil War. Penguin Books. London. 2006. ISBN 978-0-14-303765-1.
- Preston, Paul. The Spanish Civil War. Reaction, Revolution & Revenge. Harper Perennial. 2006. London. ISBN 978-0-00-723207-9 ISBN 0-00-723207-1
- Thomas, Hugh. The Spanish Civil War. Penguin Books. 2001. London. ISBN 978-0-14-101161-5
- Thomas, Hugh (1977). The Spanish Civil War. New York: Harper and Row. ISBN 978-0-06-014278-0.
