= Levante Offensive =

1938 battle of the Spanish Civil War

- Part of the Spanish Civil War
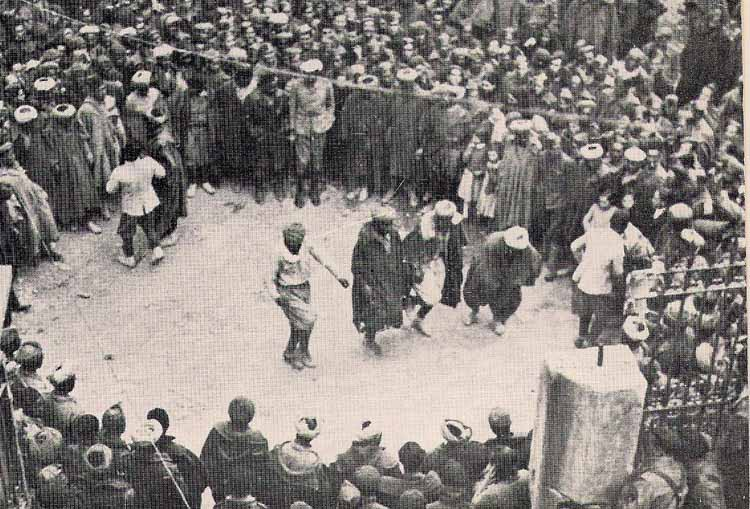
- Moroccan troops in Rubielos de Mora, 1938.
Date	25 April – 24 July 1938
Location	East Central Spain
Result	Republican victory

Belligerents
Spanish Republic	Nationalist Spain; Italy; Nazi Germany

Commanders and leaders
(Second Spanish Republic) Leopoldo Menéndez (Second Spanish Republic) Vicente Rojo Lluch (Second Spanish Republic) Carlos Romero (Second Spanish Republic) Ernesto Güemes (Second Spanish Republic) Gustavo Duran	(Spain) José Solchaga (Spain) José Enrique Varela (Spain) Rafael García Valiño (Spain) Antonio Aranda; Mario Berti

Strength
125,000	125,000; 900–1,000 artillery 400 aircraft

Casualties and losses
5,000	20,000

The Levante Offensive, launched near the end of March 1938, was an attempt by Nationalist forces under Francisco Franco to capture the Republican held city of Valencia during the Spanish Civil War. The Nationalists occupied the province of Castellón, but the offensive failed due to bad weather and the dogged resistance of the Republican troops at the XYZ defensive line.

== Background ==
Following the success of the Aragon Offensive, resulting in the Nationalist armies reaching the Mediterranean Sea, the Republic was split in two; the Spanish Republican Army was in disarray and the road to Barcelona was open for conquest by the Nationalists. Even General Vicente Rojo said that Barcelona could have been taken with "less force and in less time" than in January 1939. The Nationalist generals and Francisco Franco's German and Italian allies expected a swift attack against Barcelona. Nevertheless, Franco decided to turn south against the capital of the Spanish Republic at Valencia, because he feared French intervention in Catalonia, following the Anschluss. Furthermore, he didn't want a swift end to the war, as he wanted a war of annihilation against the Republic in order to crush all opposition. Dionisio Ridruejo said that: "A long war meant total victory. Franco chose the crueller option which, from his point of view, was also more effective."

== Nationalist offensive ==
The Nationalist offensive started on 25 April, with General José Enrique Varela's Army Corps of Castille, Antonio Aranda's Galician corps, and Garcia Valiño's formation, but the advance was halted on 27 April. On 1 May, the Nationalists continued their offensive, advancing on three fronts from Teruel (Varela), the Mediterranean sea coast (Aranda), and a central column moving between them through the mountains (Garcia Valiño). The Nationalists found it slow going due to rainy weather in March and April that slowed the offensive, the difficult terrain that aided the defense of Republican forces being driven back before them, and the dogged determination of the Republican troops, reinforced with new weapons brought in from France: Soviet Supermosca (I-16 Type 10) fighters with four machine-guns, 40 Grumman FF fighters, and anti-aircraft guns. On June 13, Castellón fell to Garcia Valiño's corps after several days of fighting but they were halted short of Sagunto where the mountains of the Sierra de Espadán came close to the sea. With the fall of Castellón, the Nationalists had a Mediterranean harbor into which munitions and food could be brought to the Nationalists troops in this front.

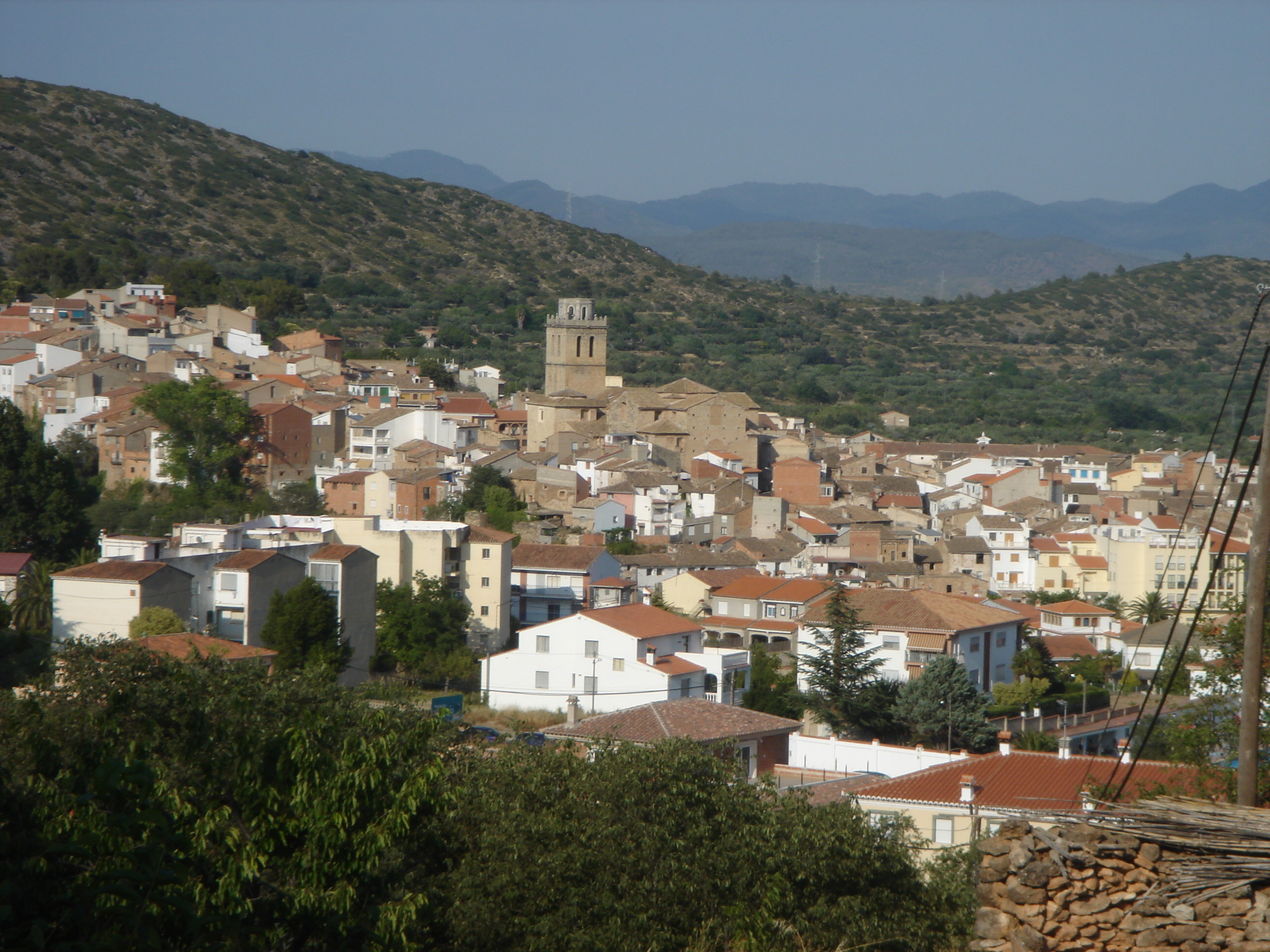
A view of Viver

The Nationalists were surprised by the resistance of the Republican forces, and General Alfredo Kindelán tried to persuade Franco to abandon the operation. The Condor Legion was exhausted and was eventually withdrawn from the front. Nevertheless, Franco ordered the attack to be continued and Valencia be captured by July 25. By the beginning of July, the Nationalists reinforced the front with three divisions of the Corpo Truppe Volontarie (CTV), led by General Mario Berti, and four divisions of General José Solchaga's Turia Corps. Furthermore, the Nationalists had nine hundred cannon and four hundred aircraft in this front, and had just received about 50 Italian medium bombers (BR.20, SM.79, SM.81). Opposing the Nationalists, the Republicans had the six army corps (Palacio's XVI Corps, Garcia Vallejo's XVII, Vidal's XIX, Duran's XX and Ibarrola's XXII, as well as Güemes's Group A and Romero's Group B) of General Leopoldo Menéndez's Army of the Levante.

On 5 July, Garcia Valiño attacked from Castellón, but he was stopped by the Republican forces led by Colonel Gustavo Duran and General Menendez at the Sierra de Espadan. The final push of the Nationalist offensive began on 13 July. To the west, Solchaga's corps moved south from Teruel with Varela's corps and the Italian CTV on their flank to the east, and the Garcia Valiño formation tried to advance down the coast. After some determined resistance at Mora de Rubielos and Sarrion, the Republican line in the Sierra del Toro crumbled. The Nationalists then advanced 60 miles along a front of twenty miles wide until they were stopped by the XYZ Line fortifications running east and west from Viver into the Sierra de Espadan.

== Battle of XYZ line ==
Between 18 and 23 July these defenses, held by two Republican corps led by Colonels Ernesto Güemes and Carlos Romero, were successful in halting the Nationalist advance. The Nationalists tried to break the republican defenses with waves of infantry and intense bombing raids, but the Republican defenders through the use of well planned trenches and protected lines of communication were able to inflict heavy casualties on the Nationalists (about 20,000 casualties), suffering relatively few themselves (only 5,000 casualties). On 23 July the offensive was halting and the Republican offensive in the north on 24 July, the Battle of the Ebro, prevented any further assaults on the line by drawing away eight Nationalist divisions and their heavy artillery. The Nationalist offensive ended less than forty kilometres from Valencia.

== Aftermath ==
According to Beevor, the defense of the XYZ Line was a far greater victory for the Republic than the Guadalajara. The Nationalists occupied the province of Castellon, but failed to occupy Valencia and suffered heavy casualties. The Republican Army had time to reorganize, and to plan the assault across the River Ebro. Furthermore, the Republican forces in Catalonia had time to rearm with the weapons received across the French frontier, which reopened in March.

== See also ==
- List of Spanish Republican military equipment of the Spanish Civil War
- List of Spanish Nationalist military equipment of the Spanish Civil War
- List of weapons of the Corpo Truppe Volontarie
- Condor Legion

== Sources ==
- Beevor, Antony. The Battle for Spain. The Spanish Civil War. Penguin Books. London. 2006. ISBN 978-0-14-303765-1.
- Preston, Paul. The Spanish Civil War. Reaction, Revolution & Revenge. Harper Perennial. 2006. London. ISBN 978-0-00-723207-9 ISBN 0-00-723207-1
- Thomas, Hugh. The Spanish Civil War. Penguin Books. 2001. London. ISBN 978-0-14-101161-5
- Thomas, Hugh (1977). The Spanish Civil War. New York: Harper and Row. ISBN 978-0-06-014278-0.
