= War in the North =

1937 Spanish Civil War campaign in northern Spain

- Part of the Spanish Civil War
- Map of the campaign
Date	31 March – 21 October 1937
Location	Northern Spain
Result	Nationalist victory

Belligerents
(Spain) Spanish Republic (Basque Country (autonomous community)) Basque Army; CNT-FAI	(Francoist Spain) Nationalist Spain (Fascist Italy) CTV (Nazi Germany) Condor Legion

Commanders and leaders
(Spain) Adolfo Prada Vaquero (Spain) Francisco Llano de la Encomienda (Spain) Francisco Ciutat (Spain) Francisco Galán (Spain) Belarmino Tomás	(Francoist Spain) Emilio Mola (Francoist Spain) José Solchaga (Francoist Spain) Fidel Davila (Fascist Italy) Ettore Bastico

Strength
120,000 soldiers thousands of anarchists milicianos 250 artillery pieces 40 tanks 70 aircraft 2 destroyers 7 armed trawlers	100,000 Nationalist soldiers 60,000 Italian soldiers 400 artillery pieces 230 aircraft 1 battleship 2 cruisers 1 destroyer

Casualties and losses
33,000 dead 100,000 prisoners one destroyer	10,000 dead one battleship

The War in the North (Spanish: Ofensiva del Norte) was a theatre of the Spanish Civil War that occurred in northern Spain from 31 March to 21 October 1937.

The Nationalists launched a number of offensives into parts of the Basque Country, Santander (Cantabria), and Asturias that formed an enclave loyal to the Republican government. The Biscay Campaign from March to July saw the bombing of Guernica and Durango and resulted in the Republicans losing the Basque Country after the Battle of Bilbao. The Nationalists captured Santander in September after the Battle of Santander and launched the Asturias Offensive against the last northern Republican stronghold in eastern Asturias. The Battle of El Mazucu saw fierce Republican resistance against Nationalist attacks and possibly the first use of carpet bombing against a military target. The War in the North ended when the Nationalists broke through the Republican lines and captured the city of Gijón at the end of October.

== Background ==
In July 1936, upon the Nationalist takeover of Navarre, their leader General Emilio Mola had announced a war of annihilation against the Second Spanish Republic and no mercy to any dissent. Harsh repression started to be implemented against those blacklisted, who were Navarrese individuals and their families. By late August, the Requeté, a pro-Nationalist Carlist militia from Navarre, advanced towards Irun in the Basque Country with a mission to cut off Republican forces in Gipuzkoa from the France–Spain border. In September, after the fall of Irun and then of San Sebastián, the Nationalists led by Francisco Franco launched a campaign in Gipuzkoa and cut off the Republican-controlled areas in northern Spain from the border with France. That area had been already isolated from the rest of Spain by Nationalist control at the beginning of the war.

Northern Spain was very attractive to the Nationalists because of the industrial production of Biscay and the mineral resources of Asturias. Control of the area would be profitable because of its valuable resources and it could force a two-front war. The resources of iron, coal, steel and chemicals were a tempting target. Furthermore, its major supplies came by sea, which was controlled by the Nationalist navy. The north being such a heavily industrialised region made it a stronghold for far-left politics and therefore the Republic. However, the northern Republicans were also politically divided and weakened by struggles between leftists and Basque nationalists, who mostly supported the Republic across the political sprectrum due to better chances for Basque autonomy. Franco realised that the capital Madrid was not going to be conquered quickly after a number of Nationalist offensives on the city and the surrounding area had failed. Franco ordered his commanders on the Madrid front to go on the defensive and to send all available resources to the north. Republican forces attempted to establish a front at Buruntza. Eventually, the front stabilised temporarily on the western fringes of Gipuzkoa (Intxorta) in October 1936, when the Basque Statute of Autonomy was passed in Madrid, and the Basque government was rapidly organised. As the Nationalists advanced, tens of thousands of panicking civilians from the occupied areas fled towards Bilbao.

== Biscay Campaign ==
On 31 March 1937, the Nationalists began a campaign to capture the province of Biscay in the Basque Country with 50,000 men of the 61st Solchaga against the Spanish Republican Army's Army of the North commanded by General Francisco Llano de la Encomienda. The same day of the Nationalist offensive, the Legión Condor bombed the town of Durango with 250 civilian deaths. The Navarrese troops attacked the town of Ochandiano, and on 4 April, occupied it only after heavy combat. Mola then decided to stop the advance because of bad weather. On 6 April, the Nationalist government in Burgos announced the blockade of the Basque ports, but some British ships entered Bilbao. On April 20, the Nationalists continued their offensive and occupied Elgeta after a heavy artillery bombardment. The same day, the Legion Condor bombed the town of Guernica. The Basques retreated to Bilbao's Iron Ring, and on 30 April, the Italian Corps of Volunteer Troops occupied Bermeo, but the Nationalist battleship España was sunk by a mine.

The Republican government decided to send 50 aircraft of the Spanish Republican Air Force to Bilbao and launched the Huesca Offensive and the Segovia Offensive to stop the Nationalist advance, but both failed. On 3 June, Mola was killed in an airplane crash and replaced by Fidel Davila. On 12 June, the Battle of Bilbao began when the Nationalists started their assault of the Iron Ring and, after heavy aerial and artillery bombings, they entered the city on 19 June, completing their conquest of the Biscay and the Basque Country.

== Battle of Santander ==
After the fall of Bilbao, the Republican government decided to launch an offensive against Brunete on 6 July to stop the Nationalist offensive in the north, but the offensive had ended by 25 July. The Republican troops in Santander Province (Cantabria) had low morale, though the Basque soldiers did not want to stop fighting. On 14 August, the Nationalists launched their offensive against Cantabria, with the 90,000 men (25,000 of whom were Italian) and 200 aircraft of the Army of the North. On 17 August, the Italians occupied the El Escudo Pass and encircled 22 Republican battalions at Campoo. On 24 August, the Basque troops surrendered to the Italians at Santoña, which led to the Santoña Agreement, and the Republican troops fled from Santander. On 26 August, the Italians occupied the city of Santander, and by 1 September, the Nationalists had occupied almost all of Cantabria. The Nationalists captured 60,000 prisoners, the greatest number during the war.

== Asturias Campaign ==
The Nationalists decided to continue their offensive into Asturias after the failed Republican offensive against Zaragoza. Eastern Asturias was a Republican stronghold and the last piece of Republican-held territory in the north. The Nationalists had overwhelming numerical and material superiority, with 90,000 men against 45,000 and more than 200 aircraft against 35, but the Republican Army in Asturias was better organised than in Santander and the difficult mountainous terrain would provide excellent defensive positions. The Battle of El Mazuco saw 30,000 Navarrese troops led by Solchaga and supported by the Legion Condor try to break through into eastern Asturias. This involved the widespread use of carpet bombing against Republican positions, in possibly one of its first uses against military targets in warfare. The El Mazuco valley and the critical nearby mountains (Peña Blanca and Pico Turbina), which were held by 5,000 Republican soldiers, fell to the Nationalists only after 33 days of bloody combat.

On 14 October, the Nationalists broke the Republican front and, on October 17, the Republican government ordered the evacuation of Asturias to begin. However, Nationalist ships were blockading the Asturian ports, and only the few military commanders Adolfo Prada, Francisco Galán, and Belarmino Tomas managed to escape. By 21 October, the Nationalists had occupied Gijón and completed the conquest of the northern zone.

== Aftermath ==
With the conquest of northern Spain, the Nationalists controlled 36% of Spanish industrial production, 60% of the coal production and all of the steel production. Furthermore, more than 100,000 Republican prisoners of war were forced to join the Nationalist army or were sent to labour battalions. The Republic had lost the Army of the North (more than 200,000 soldiers), and by then, a complete military victory of the Republic in the war became impossible. Franco then decided to start a new offensive against Madrid, but Vicente Rojo Lluch, the leader of the Republican Army, launched a diversionary offensive in Aragon, resulting in the Battle of Teruel.

== See also ==
- List of Spanish Nationalist military equipment of the Spanish Civil War
- Condor Legion
- List of weapons of the Corpo Truppe Volontarie
- List of Spanish Republican military equipment of the Spanish Civil War
- Kasilda Hernáez

== Bibliography ==
- Beevor, Antony (2006). The Battle for Spain: The Spanish Civil War 1936-1939. Penguin. ISBN 978-0-14-303765-1.
- Graham, Helen. (2005). The Spanish Civil War. A Very Short introduction. Oxford University Press. ISBN 978-0-19-280377-1.
- Jackson, Gabriel. (1967) The Spanish Republic and the Civil War, 1931–1939. Princeton University Press. Princeton. ISBN 978-0-691-00757-1.
- Preston, Paul (2013). The Spanish Holocaust: Inquisition and Extermination in Twentieth-Century Spain. London, UK: HarperCollins. ISBN 978-0-00-638695-7.
- Thomas, Hugh (2001). The Spanish Civil War. Penguin Books, Limited (UK). ISBN 978-0-14-101161-5.
