= Fall of Barcelona =

Capture of Barcelona by the Nationalist faction (1939)

- Part of Catalonia Offensive
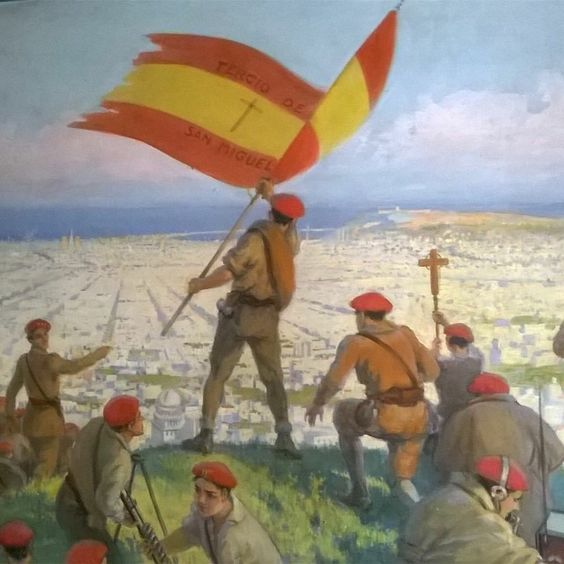
- Painting of Nationalist troops approaching Barcelona
Date	26 January 1939; 87 years ago
Location	Barcelona, Catalonia, Spain
Result	Nationalist victory

Belligerents
Spanish Republic: Generalitat of Catalonia	Nationalist Spain; (Fascist Italy) CTV; (Nazi Germany) Condor Legion

Commanders and leaders
(Second Spanish Republic) Vicente Rojo; (Second Spanish Republic) Juan Hernández Saravia; (Second Spanish Republic) Juan Modesto; (Second Spanish Republic) José Riquelme; (Second Spanish Republic) Manuel Tagüeña	(Francoist Spain) Francisco Franco; (Francoist Spain) Fidel Dávila Arrondo; (Francoist Spain) Luis Orgaz Yoldi; (Francoist Spain) José Solchaga; (Francoist Spain) Juan Yagüe; (Fascist Italy) Gastone Gambara

Strength
30,000?	120,000?

Casualties and losses
Unclear	Unclear

The fall of Barcelona was the capture of Barcelona, until then in the Republican zone, by the Nationalists; it took place on 26 January 1939, during the final phases of the Spanish Civil War. The event was part of the Catalan Offensive, which took the Catalan enclave of the Republic. The offensive unfolded from late December 1938; the Republicans offered some resistance, but they were not in a position to mount any larger counter-offensive and there was no major battle fought either in western Catalonia or on the approaches to Barcelona.

Initially, Republican leaders intended to defend Barcelona, and the ultimate line of resistance was planned along the Llobregat. However, on 20 January, as a contingency option prime minister Juan Negrín ordered preparations for a would-be evacuation. On 23 January, when the supreme Republican military commander General Rojo informed the government that effective defence of the Llobregat was unlikely, the evacuation began. The central and the autonomous Catalan governments left Barcelona on 23–24 January and a power vacuum started to emerge. Eventually Barcelona was declared an open city and apart from isolated skirmishes, there was no combat on the streets.

The fall of Barcelona preceded the fall of all of Catalonia, which took place in early February 1939. For the Republicans, it marked the loss of vital industrial production and some 200,000 troops; also, it enhanced the spirit of defeatism, already ruling among most segments of the population. However, the fall of Barcelona and the fall of Catalonia did not mark the end of the Republic. The government moved to the central-southern zone, initially to Madrid, and the war continued until 1 April 1939.

== Catalonia offensive ==
Spain, late 1938; Catalan enclave in pink, top-right

Following 30 months of the civil war, in late 1938 the Republican-held part of Spain (one-third of national territory) was inhabited by almost 9 million population, compared to almost 15 million in the Nationalist-held zone. The Republican part was divided into 2 separated zones. The larger one, some 130,000 km^{2} and almost 6.5m people, comprised the southern part of the Mediterranean coast, part of New Castile, La Mancha and eastern Andalusia, with 10 provincial capitals. The smaller one, Catalonia except its western belt, already controlled by the Nationalists, was some 25,000 km^{2}. Nominally it hosted some 2.5 million people, yet including refugees the figure was probably higher; the area comprised 3 provincial capitals, Barcelona, Tarragona and Girona. Since October 1937 Barcelona had hosted key Republican state structures, including the government, the president and the rump parliament; besides, it was home to the autonomous Catalan government and the exiled autonomous Basque government. Also, the supreme Republican military command was based in Barcelona.

In early November 1938 the Battle of the Ebro terminated with Nationalist troops regaining all territory lost since July. Though at that point there was some lack of clarity in their high command as to the direction of the future offensive, later that month it was already agreed that the next target should be Catalonia, with the objective of overrunning the entire enclave. Before December the first sketchy plan of the campaign was already in place, worked out the details during the following weeks. The Nationalists were organized in 2 armies, North (commander Fidel Dávila, 19 divisions) and Levante (Luis Orgaz, 9 divisions), 28 divisions in total; the overall command was with Francisco Franco. Official intendancy data listed 332,000 troops, including reserve units. Initial plans envisioned the start of the offensive around 15 December, yet it was postponed a few times. It is not clear when the Nationalist general staff envisioned the seizure of Barcelona or the end of the campaign.

Republican troops in Catalonia were organized in Grupo de Ejércitos de la Region Oriental (GERO) under the command of Juan Hernández Saravia; however, its operations were under direct supervision of the overall commander of Republican army, general Vicente Rojo, who also resided in Barcelona. GERO was composed of 2 armies, East (Juan Perea Capulino, 9 divisions) and Ebro (Juan Modesto, 11 divisions), 20 divisions in total. Nationalist intelligence estimated that GERO numbered some 150,000 soldiers in 65 mixed brigades (comparable to regiment) or 260 battalions; present-day historian offers similar estimates, with the overall strength of 220,000 troops and 140,000 in frontline combat units. The Nationalists enjoyed a great advantage in terms of armour and aviation, but it was massive especially in the case of firepower: in terms of artillery pieces and mortars they outnumbered the Republicans 5:1. Also, Republican divisions were mostly under strength. Geography favoured the defenders; numerous hilly ranges and mid-size rivers, high waters at this time of the year, formed natural obstacles.

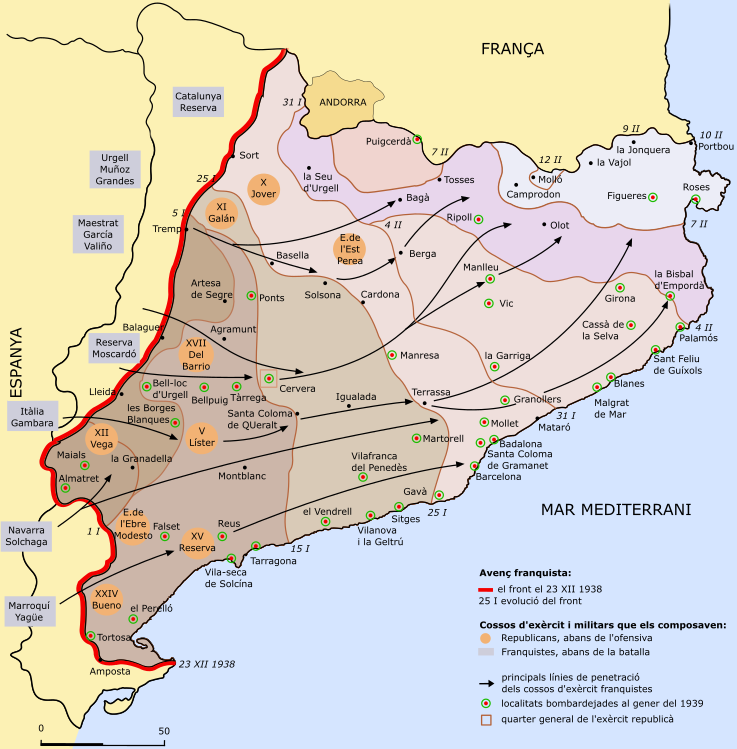
Catalonia offensive

The Nationalist offensive in Catalonia commenced on 23 December 1938; Balaguer, the point closest to Barcelona, held by the Nationalists, was some 120 km away. Operations commenced in the extreme western Republican salient projecting into Nationalist lines in-between the Segre and the Ebro. Most fighting took place along a 50-km long frontline in the county of Garrigues. Until the year-end the Nationalists overran the salient; it was only at this point that in the first days of 1939 another offensive was launched north-east of Lleida, in the county of Noguera. By 5 January the Republican front collapsed, and the Nationalists broke into operational space. Re-organised Republican troops were not in position to mount a counter-offensive and were capable merely of slowing down the enemy advance; it progressed in the course of numerous minor engagements, but with no major battle fought. Though after 2 weeks of combat the Nationalists were still no closer than 110 km to Barcelona, their offensive was now progressing along a 150-km long frontline from Tremp at the Pyrenean foothills in the north to Tortosa on the Mediterranean coast in the south.

== Barcelona, 5 to 15 January ==
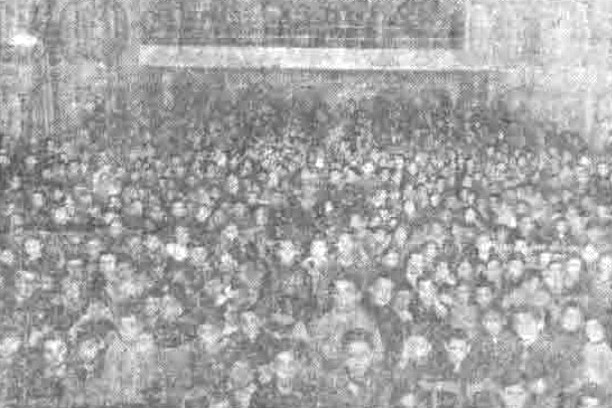
illusion of normality: festival para los niños, Barcelona, early 1939

In the very first days of 1939 daily life in Barcelona did not differ much from the earlier wartime period. Catalan industry, since the summer of 1936 on a revolutionary footing, was in decline, yet a contemporary scholar concluded that "the Catalan war industry continued functioning very well until the very end of the conflict". In late 1938 its output was some 40% of the pre-war period; most factories kept operating, in some cases with production ongoing until mid-January. Like everywhere in the Republican zone, food was subject to rationing; some authors claim that Barcelona dwellers until then lived rather comfortably, but some claim that the city was suffering from hunger and there are accounts featuring teenage girls approaching strangers in cafeterias and offering themselves in exchange for food. The annual inflation rate was some 260%, but given there was little to buy and food was to large extent purchased on the black market anyway, monetary problems did not matter much. Municipal services kept operating and newspapers were being issued. Cinemas remained open, with screenings of pre-war foreign (e.g. Beloved Enemy with David Niven) or Spanish (e.g. Rinconcito madrileño with Luis Prendes) movies.

The press were fairly accurately reporting frontline developments, yet contrary to facts they claimed that their own troops were doing well, remained in excellent spirits and kept inflicting heavy losses upon the enemy. Popular Front parties started publishing repeated calls for males to volunteer for either combat troops or fortification units, though with at best a moderate response on the part of the population. To enhance the spirit of resistance, some newspapers published horror stories of hundreds of thousands people already murdered in political purges in the Nationalist zone. Defeatism was treated as an offence; on 8 January a well-known writer Eduardo Zamacois was sentenced to 6 years in prison for the spirit of derrotismo in his novels. To introduce a more serene tone, on 6 January the president declared an amnesty for all prisoners above 60 years of age.

Nationalist troops were reportedly taking hundreds of prisoners every day and the strength of the Republicans was dwindling dramatically. On 5 January the Republican Ministry of Defence issued a decree which broadened conscription to males born in 1901 ("quinta de 1922") and these who complete 18 years of age in the first quarter of 1939, even though they had not undergone any military training at all; they would form part of a theoretical "quinta de 1942". It is not clear how many new conscripts were pressed into service, yet it is known that many of those called defaulted or went into hiding, usually in their relatives' premises. For these who did show up, there were not many rifles available, as even frontline units reported shortages of arms and munitions. Nationalist intelligence estimated that Republican human reserves in Catalonia were 45,000 men aged 37–41 and 34.000 men aged 41–44.

UGT recruitment propaganda in Catalan

Around 10 January the situation at the front became so dire that the Republican command started to fear total breakdown and collapse of organised military resistance. On 12 January the government broadened conscription even further, to "reemplazos de 1915 a 1921", effectively calling to arms men in their mid-40s. All war-related industry was declared militarised, rearguard units were to be subject to review to send all fit men to frontline units, Batallones de Obras y Fortificaciones were dissolved and their members incorporated into infantry. Retired governmental employees were called to service in public sectors with labour shortages. Trade unions called women to fill vacancies created by males departing for the front. Young activists, e.g. from the JSU, roamed the streets and called to arms, e.g. interrupting music in cafeterias or showings in cinemas.

In early January it was clear to Republican officials that the Nationalist advance was not a local offensive to gain some territory, but an attempt to overrun the entire Catalan enclave. All active political forces represented in Barcelona seemed united behind the governmental policy of resistance and there were no official voices of dissent heard, e.g. about commencing talks on truce or surrender. On 8 January the Barcelona CNT-UGT liaison committee recommended mobilising all industry workers except these who were absolutely necessary to ensure military production. The Communists focused on recruitment to army units, the Anarchists talked rather about their own militia. PSUC declared all their members mobilised under their military discipline. Some propaganda squabbles between the Communist and Anarchist press continued. On the other hand, on 13 January the executive committees of the Socialist UGT and the Anarchist CNT had their first ever joint sitting; both declared total support for governmental efforts.

== Last days of Republican Barcelona ==
=== Sunday, 15 January ===
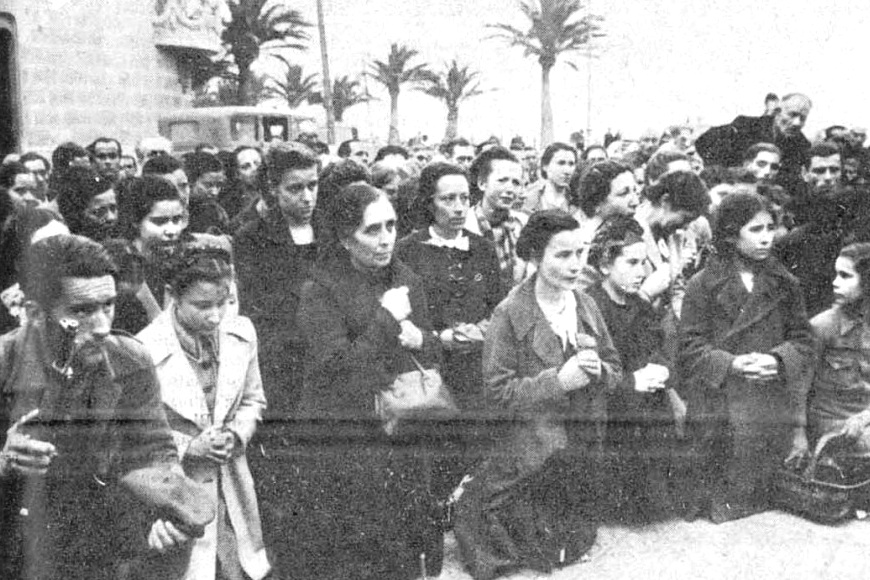
first religious service in Nationalist-seized Tarragona

The Nationalists seized one of 3 Catalan provincial capitals still controlled by the Republicans, Tarragona, located some 80 km away from Barcelona. At that moment the closest point to Barcelona they controlled was Santa Coloma de Queralt, already some 65 km away from the capital. The news was made public the same day and had enormous impact on the population. Until that day some had tended to trust official propaganda and though probably very few, if any, believed in Republican victory, they might have calculated that it was months before the Nationalists might reach Ciutat Comtal, or even that the Republican resistance might lead to some kind of truce. The fall of Tarragona marked a dramatic change and most residents realized that Barcelona was now under direct threat. In some political groups, e.g. within the Catalanist ERC, the idea that the fall of Catalonia was not only inevitable but also imminent, started to take root.

For the first time, parties and unions began to talk not about defending Catalonia, but rather about the need to fortify the city, anticipating the expected siege of the Catalan capital. Both civilian (Negrín) and military (Rojo) leaders started to consider mounting an ultimate defence line along the Llobregat river, in its lower section flowing directly at the outskirts of Barcelona. However, in parallel and still rather as a contingency, in utmost secrecy Negrín commenced work on evacuation schemes. Newspapers doubled their propaganda efforts. The Nationalists were usually referred to as foreign invaders on Spanish soil, with a focus on Moroccan, Italian and German units. The local Republican advance in Extremadura, commenced on 5 January some 800 km away, was put on an equal footing with the Nationalist one in Catalonia and at times even occupied more space in the papers. Following a few months of no arms supplies from the USSR, on 15 January the first Soviet ship with additional deliveries, requested by Negrín's envoy to Moscow Hidalgo de Cisneros in early December, arrived in Bordeaux; some weapons would reach Catalonia before its fall, but it is not clear whether they reached Barcelona.

=== Monday, 16 January ===
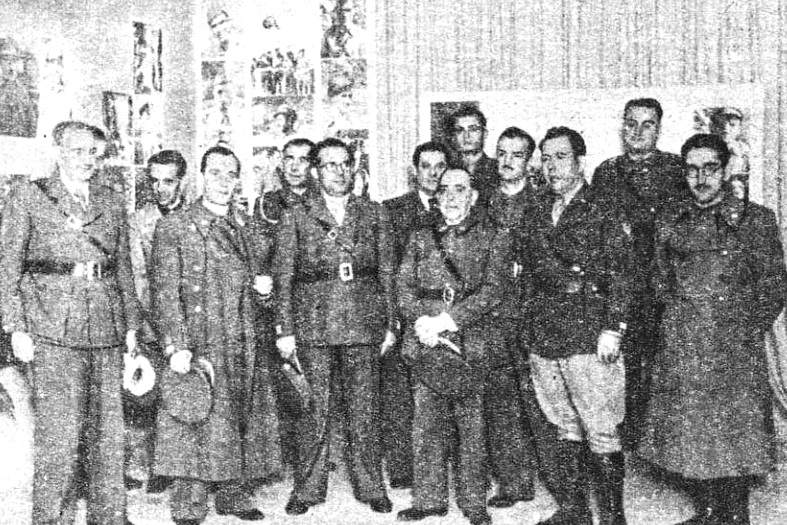
Republican command of Barcelona, general Riquelme in centre

The government declared all males between 17 and 55 subject to military discipline; a separate decree declared all males above 55 who were entitled to any financial benefits, including pension, subject to mandatory public service if called. Political parties, trade unions and other organisations supported the measures and kept manifesting their will to fight; specific organisations declared creating their own combat battalions, including batallón de ametralladoras, yet this remained clear fiction as machine guns were few and missing even in frontline machine gun platoons. Though the nationwide Anarchist congress, held in Valencia, voiced their disagreement with decrees of mobilisation, claiming that they paralysed labor union and political life, in Catalonia neither the CNT nor FAI upheld this claim.

At mobilisation points and in the barracks a rather moderate inflow of males called to arms continued. New recruits, about to be pressed into military service, were missing uniforms, equipment and arms; they were hardly undergoing any training and some preparations boiled down to propaganda addresses by political commissars. Though seemingly scarcely enthusiastic, when interrogated by superiors the recruits declared they were prepared and determined to fight "hasta el final", yet later Rojo wrote that "for the spirit of resistance there had been substituted the idea of salvation. Everyone was afraid of being cut off". Revolutionary tribunals, set up in 1936–1937, continued operating at least until this day, as the last sentence against supposed anti-Republican subversives documented in archives is dated 16 January.

=== Tuesday, 17 January ===
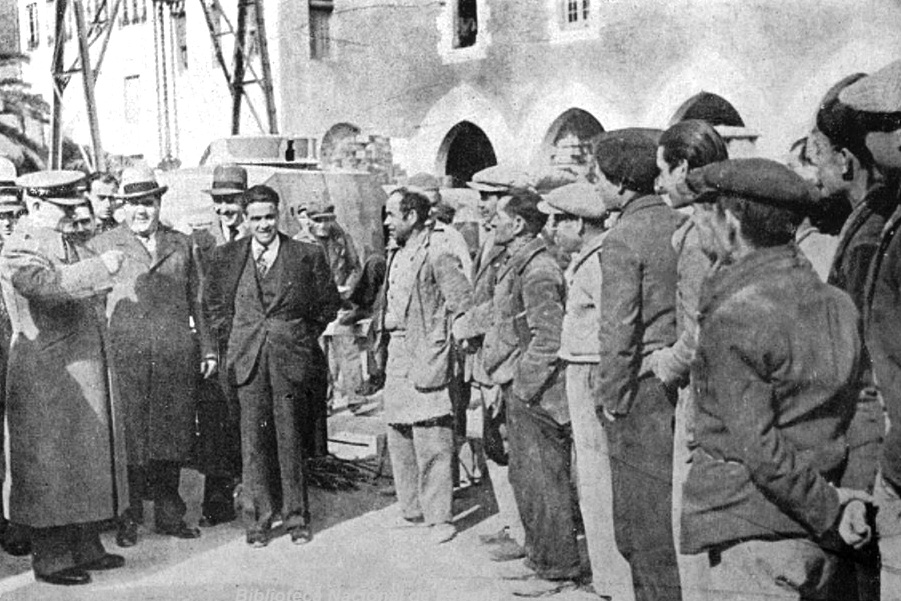
high officers inspecting military production plant, Barcelona

The Ministry of Interior issued a decree which envisioned seizure of private-held radio receivers. The measure was officially explained as a response to a flood of rumours, including the wildest ones, which were often repeated after the Nationalist radio broadcasts; it was also intended to prevent a would-be panic. Owners were supposed to present their receivers in specified points of the city within 4 days, yet it is not clear how many inhabitants complied. The prime minister Negrin called the president Manuel Azaña and given the pace of Nationalist advance suggested the president leave his residence, some 30 km north-west of Barcelona, and move to a safer place.

As during the previous few days, a number of rallies were organised by various organisations and informal groupings; speakers assured their audiences that Republican resistance was insurmountable and that the enemy stood no chance of taking Barcelona, though they also called for mobilisation and total support for the war effort. Messages of support from abroad, usually from various Communist parties, were read. It is not clear how many inhabitants indeed believed these statements. Many preferred to believe various rumours which started to circulate, especially that France was going to intervene and send its troops, establishing a sort of protectorate. Elaborate details were being added, e.g. that colonial Senegalese units would be deployed in Catalonia. The possibility of a would-be French intervention was also considered in diplomatic circles.

=== Wednesday, 18 January ===
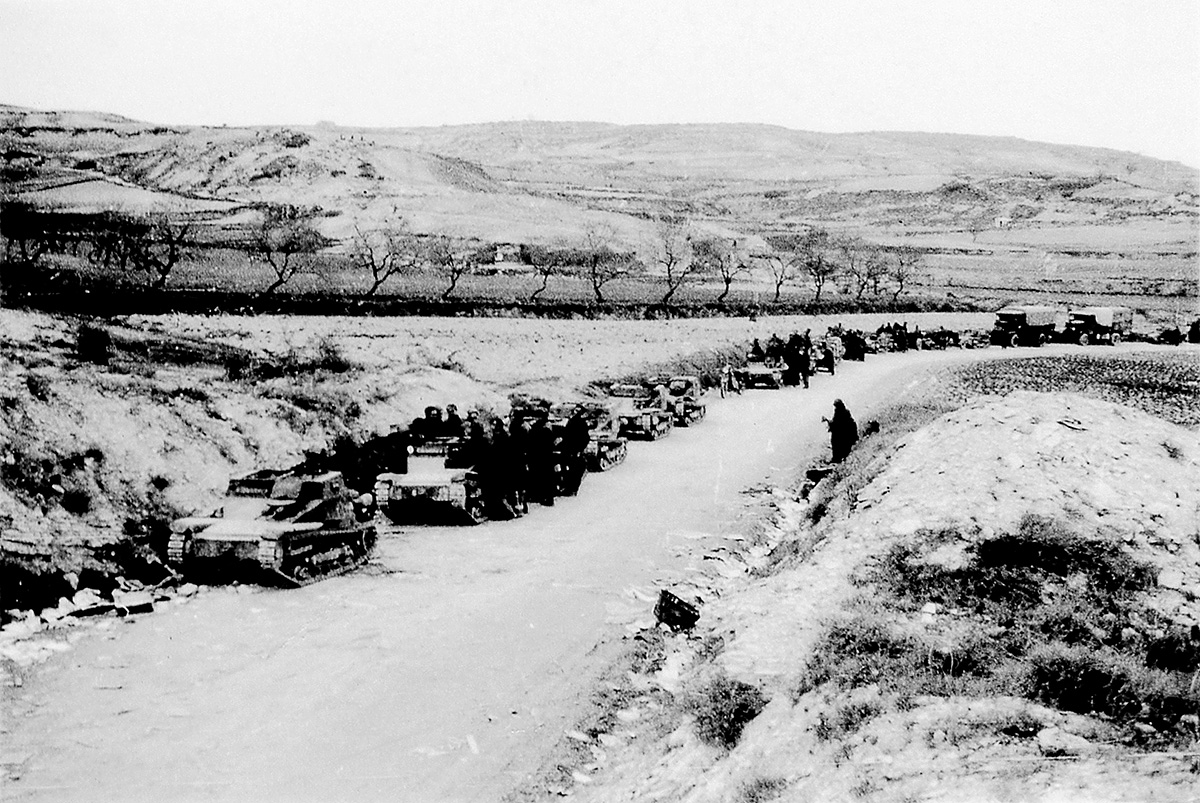
Italian tankettes near Santa Coloma

During the cabinet meeting some members expressed hope that in the forthcoming session of the French parliament the prime minister Leon Blum would declare the non-intervention policy abandoned; this in turn would lead to a major change in policy of the great powers towards the Spanish civil war, possibly including a military engagement. During the same sitting, with the president of the autonomous government of Catalonia invited, Lluís Companys criticised the central government for alleged marginalisation of the Catalan autonomous government. No one opposed the policy of resistance, but neither were any meaningful decisions taken.

A number of well-known personalities, including Martínez Barrio, Ramón Lamoneda, Nicolau d'Olwer, Antonio Machado, Manuel Irujo, and Margarita Nelken signed an open letter to the international audience; it falsely claimed that in Santa Coloma de Queralt the Nationalists had machine-gunned hundreds of people. The signatories called the international community not to allow the same, but on a much larger scale, to happen in Barcelona; it was one more attempt to reach out to international observers in hopes of triggering some sort of intervention.

During the evening, general Rojo spoke over the radio; unlike in the case of top politicians, it was an exceptional measure, as the supreme army commander had never done it before. The content did not differ much from other broadcasts and was a general call for resistance, yet to most listeners it delivered a sense of urgency and immediate threat.

=== Thursday, 19 January ===
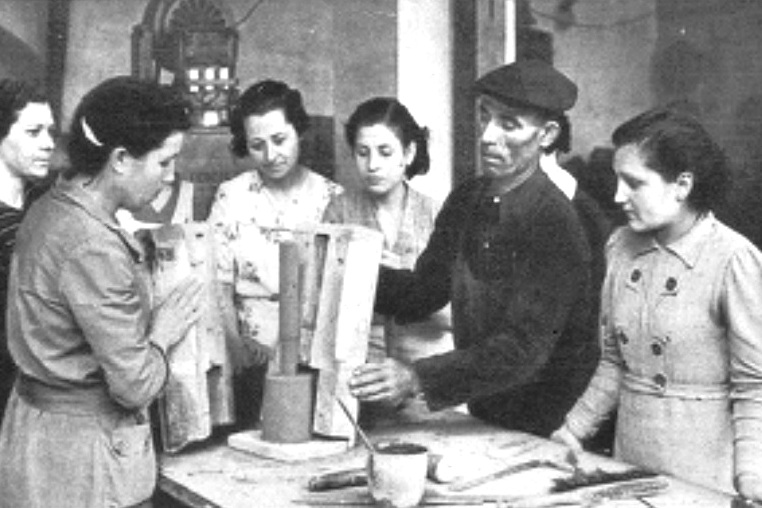
Barcelona: Women learning to replace men in production

On the central section of the frontline the advanced Nationalist units entered the villages of Pontons and La Llacuna, while along the Mediterranean coastline they approached Vilanova i la Geltrú; all these locations were some 50 km away from Barcelona. Though in the north, large parts of the Lleida province and the entire Girona province remained controlled by the Republicans, in the south the Nationalists were now descending into the Foix valley, with Serra d'Ordal as the last major natural obstacle separating them from the Llobregat.

Though 19 January was a usual working week, on Thursday, there were some 100 rallies held across the city, organised by parties, trade unions and other organisations. Groups of young people, especially women from the JSU, toured institutions and working places calling men to join armed units and ridiculing or stigmatizing these who did not intend to. Newspapers published numerous manifestos, declarations and calls to arms; accounts from frontlines featured stories about heroism and sacrifice, highlighting episodes and personalities iconic for Republican advantages. In the evening it became clear that the French parliament was not likely to take decisions related to the Spanish war soon, and hopes of foreign intervention subsided.

=== Friday, 20 January ===
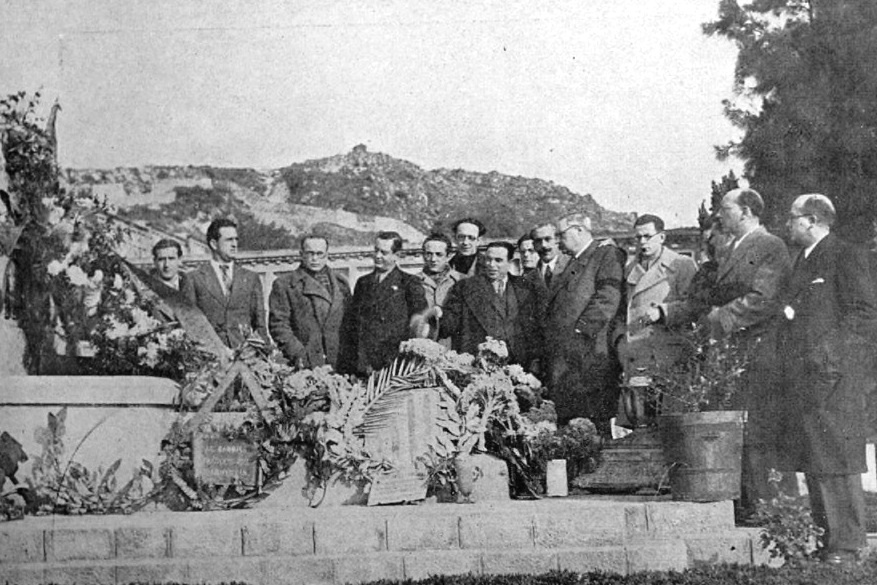
Republicans at the tomb of Macià

Nationalist troops, so far most advanced on coastal and central sectors of the front, progressed also north-west of Barcelona, reaching the slopes of Serra de Castelltalat and the outskirts of Calaf, which was taken the same day; they were starting to near approaches to Igualada and Manresa. President Azaña in his residence noted having heard very distant artillery fire.

During the day news from Paris was urgently awaited, as talks in the French parliament continued; eventually they were suspended until Tuesday, 24 January. The Barcelona press clung to any signs of hope, e.g. referring calls to convene the House of Commons in London or to discuss war atrocities in the League of Nations headquarters in Geneva.

The Catalan president played a secondary role during the first days of 1939. The Generalitat kept issuing decrees which usually repeated official governmental measures, e.g. these related to conscription or militarisation of industry. On 20 January Companys spoke over the radio; he declared Catalonia "an impenetrable fortress" and called the Catalans not to allow the enemy to desecrate the tomb of Francesc Macià. The following day his address was either quoted or extensively referred in the morning papers.

=== Saturday, 21 January ===
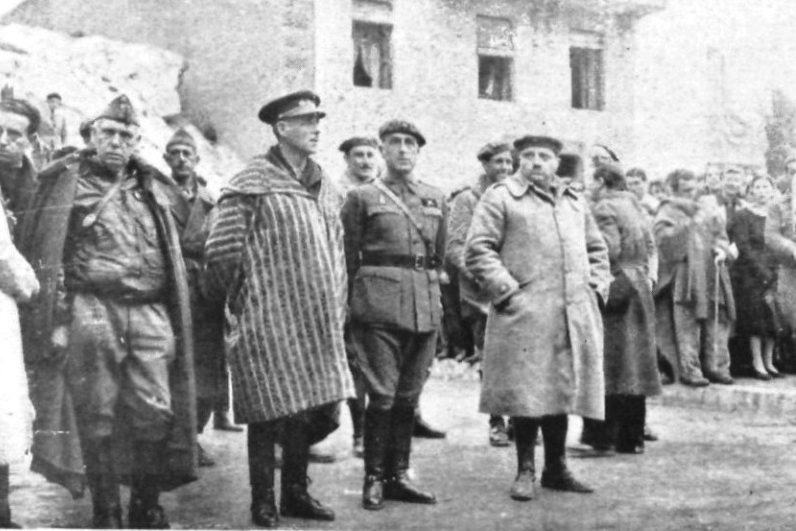
Nationalist commanders on approaches to Barcelona

The Nationalists seized Vilafranca del Penedes and Vilanova i la Geltrú in the south and Saint Joan de Mediona and Sant Pere Sacarrera in the centre; all these places were some 40–45 km from Barcelona. President Azaña left his residence near Terrassa and moved some 30 km east, north-east of Barcelona. Some departments of the central government commenced preparations for evacuation; works began on orders of Negrín. Negrín also called Companys and made a veiled suggestion that the Generalitat prepare for evacuation, which Companys started to implement. To avoid panic, these activities were kept secret, but since all drivers in the service of the autonomous government were told to gather at specified points in the city on Monday, 23 January, news started to spread. The first official vehicles began to appear on roads leading from Barcelona northbound. Frederic Escofet, head of the auxiliary public order force Esquadres de Catalunya, on explicit orders from Companys told his men to leave the city the following day.

Head of the Economy Department in autonomous government, Joan Comorera from the PSUC, was outraged by preparations for evacuation. He issued an order which suspended all industrial and commercial activities in Barcelona for the week starting Monday, 23 January; the declared purpose was to enable all employees to take part in fortification works. The legality of his decrees was highly dubious, yet no-one decided to challenge him. Some scholars claim that Comorera was becoming the de facto mayor of Barcelona, if not president of the entire Generalitat; as there were the first signs of a power vacuum gradually emerging in the city, it was reportedly being filled by energetic, resolute and determined individuals like Comorera.

=== Sunday, 22 January ===
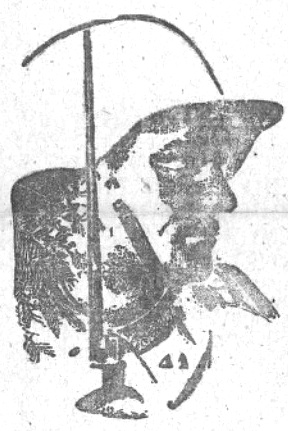
Republican propaganda drawing, January 1939

It was Sunday with offices, shops and working places closed, yet in some places the spirit of resistance seemed to rule. The CNT-UGT liaison committee decided to support Comorera. Also heads of some departments of the Catalan government ordered their employees to abandon daily work and present in the nearest military command centre. A plan to plant explosives along metro lines and all major installations of the city emerged among some Anarchists; they were to inflict massive losses on advancing Nationalist troops if they made it to the city, even at the cost of disastrous damage to urban infrastructure. The suggestions were immediately quashed by Negrín. The spirit of resistance was enhanced when some 1,900 International Brigades volunteers arrived in the port of Barcelona, transported by ships from Valencia.

However, many thought the city was not defendable. Quoting "les poques possibilitats de vencer les tropes franquistes" Escofet also ordered Mossos d'Esquadra, the regional police of some 1,000 people, to leave the city and move north. Members of Esquadres and Mossos started to disappear from city streets. Another sign of crumbling Republican administration was the suspension of postal services (officially only reduced), due to males having been in military service. Evacuation works in offices of both central and autonomous governments were ongoing, for the time being reduced to selection, packing and loading documentation; however, some cars were already heading out of the city towards the north. Among those who left there were Largo Caballero, Antonio Machado and Luis Araquistaín. As usual on Sunday, cafes and cinemas remained opened. During the day Nationalist soldiers were seen in Monistrol d'Anoia and Sant Sadurní d'Anoia, 30 km from Plaça de Catalunya.

=== Monday, 23 January ===
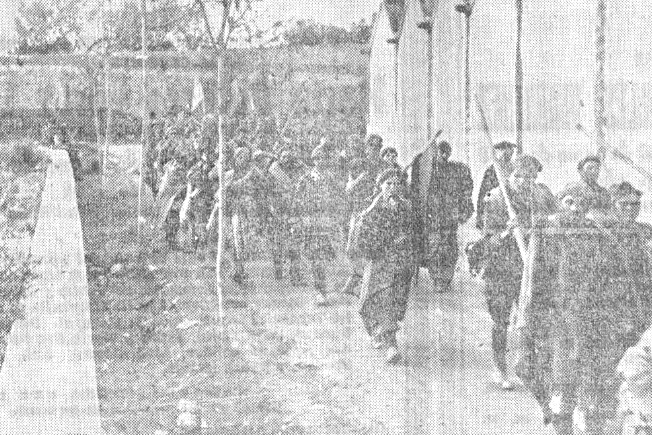
Carlist requetés advance across Catalonia, January 1939

The cabinet meeting – as it would turn out, the last one in Barcelona – was concluded a few hours after midnight. Martial law was declared on the entire republican territory. Negrín passed on the information, just received from Rojo, that attempts to mount a last line of resistance along the Llobregat had failed and most likely counter-action of Republican troops would be reduced to manoeuvrable defence on the right and the left bank of the river. The government decided to release a declaration claiming the cabinet would stay in Barcelona. However, just when it was being published over the radio (in Spain newspapers usually did not go out on Mondays), Negrín ordered evacuation of all government offices to begin. The order was implemented immediately, and a scramble for available vehicles began.

In line with Comorera's decree, all workplaces were closed, though probably rather few employees reported to fortification works. Trams ceased to circulate. Convoys of vehicles were loaded with chests containing documentation, while smoke of burning papers started to emerge from some official buildings. Starting early afternoon, all institutions, organizations and entities with any vehicles and petrol available – from Institució de les Lletres Catalanes to fábrica aeronáutica Elizalde - were already busy preparing for evacuation, and some inhabitants with improvised means appeared on roads leading north of Barcelona.

CNT, FAI and Juventudes Libertarias staged a plenary session; they decided to move to Figueres, but stuck to the idea of defending the city and entrusted García Oliver – who attended briefly – with this task. He ordered a dedicated staff meeting for later in the day, and when no-one showed up, in the evening he left Barcelona. At the time young Anarchist militants were roaming the city mobilising whoever they found to join the defenders. Some PCE members like Sánchez Arcas or Hidalgo de Cisneros also left, alike members of the Basque government, e.g. José Antonio Aguirre and Manuel Irujo. Executive committees of PSOE and UGT decided to evacuate.

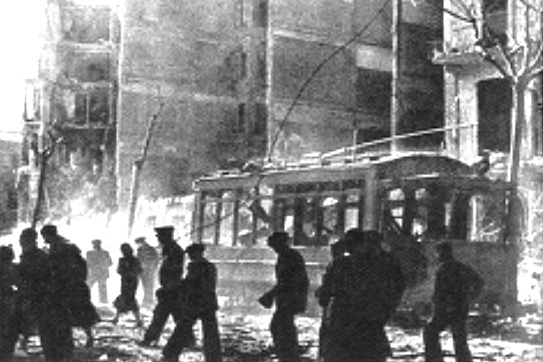
Barcelona after bombing raid

Having rejected plans to destroy all goods stored in harbour warehouses, the undersecretary for supplies Antonio Cordón decided to distribute foodstuffs among residents; the order was delayed by a bombing raid of 45 German and Italian aircraft. Some attempts were made to organise the evacuation of wounded combatants from hospitals; it is estimated there were some 20,000 of them in the city. However, little or nothing was done. Director general de la Sanidad, Josep Puche, managed to organise a transport of a few hundred, but most were left in their beds, taken care of by whoever remained of the sanitary personnel. Rojo gave new defensive dispositions; commanders of both armies and their divisions moved headquarters to the left bank of the Llobregat. In the afternoon Rojo advised Negrín to leave the city; the prime minister left in the evening. By that time the Nationalists had seized Garraf, Vallcarca, Gelida, and Sant Esteve de Sesrovires, some of these locations 25 km from Plaça de Catalunya.

=== Tuesday, 24 January ===
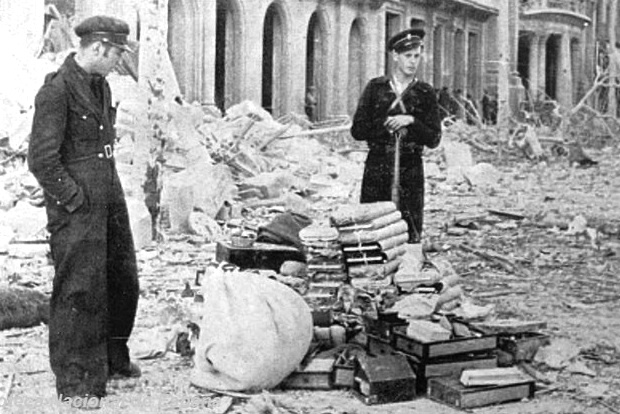
Assault Guards in Barcelona

During the night, around 3 AM, Catalan president Lluís Companys left the site of the Generalitat and drove north; he would return to Barcelona 21 months later, as a prisoner to be executed. The interior minister Paulino Gómez ordered Assault Guards to evacuate towards Girona; at this point the city was left with no forces of law and order. However, SIM remained on duty; its units were evacuating prisoners, e.g. 600 inmates from Modelo were moved out, among them bishop Polanco and Domingo Rey d'Harcourt; no killings took place. Many inmates were left in their cells until the arrival of the Nationalists, some with the intention to hand them out for slaughter. In the chaos some, like the POUM leader Julián Gorkin, managed to escape. POUM leaders who remained at liberty met; most opted to flee, though some decided to remain and fight. The last Barcelona-based issue of the official gazette, Gaceta de la Republica, was published.

In the early hours of 24 January Rojo issued his last defence orders, particularly anxious to prevent encirclement by Nationalist troops advancing north of Barcelona; this would cut off evacuation routes leading towards Girona. He ordered the destruction of all bridges on the Llobregat, confirmed Saravia as commander of GERO, Modesto as commander of troops holding the frontline and José Riquelme as commander of Barcelona. Rojo left the city shortly afterwards. Riquelme held a staff meeting, but later the same day he was dismissed by Negrín, already in Figueres. José Brandaris, the new commander of Barcelona called from Menorca, was unfamiliar with the Catalan frontline; he voiced his concerns and eventually was re-nominated commander of Olot. Command in Barcelona fell on Colonel Jesús Velasco Echave, at that point the head of coastal defence; he had never managed to assume new duties.

Throughout the day Barcelona started to look like a ghost city. When Andre Malraux visited the Comissariat de Propaganda, a huge building previously bustling with various activities, the only person present was a porter. CNT headquarters was also empty. Various accounts provide recollections of empty offices with floors covered in papers and telephones ringing incessantly, no-one there to take calls. Offices, shops, factories were either closed or empty; public transport including the metro was not operating, shortages in electricity supply caused shutdowns in entire quarters. Most high officials had already left, but there were exceptions. Comorera insisted on the execution of his decrees and tried to organise contingents of workers to dig trenches west of the city. Zugazagoitia and Cordón were still at their posts.

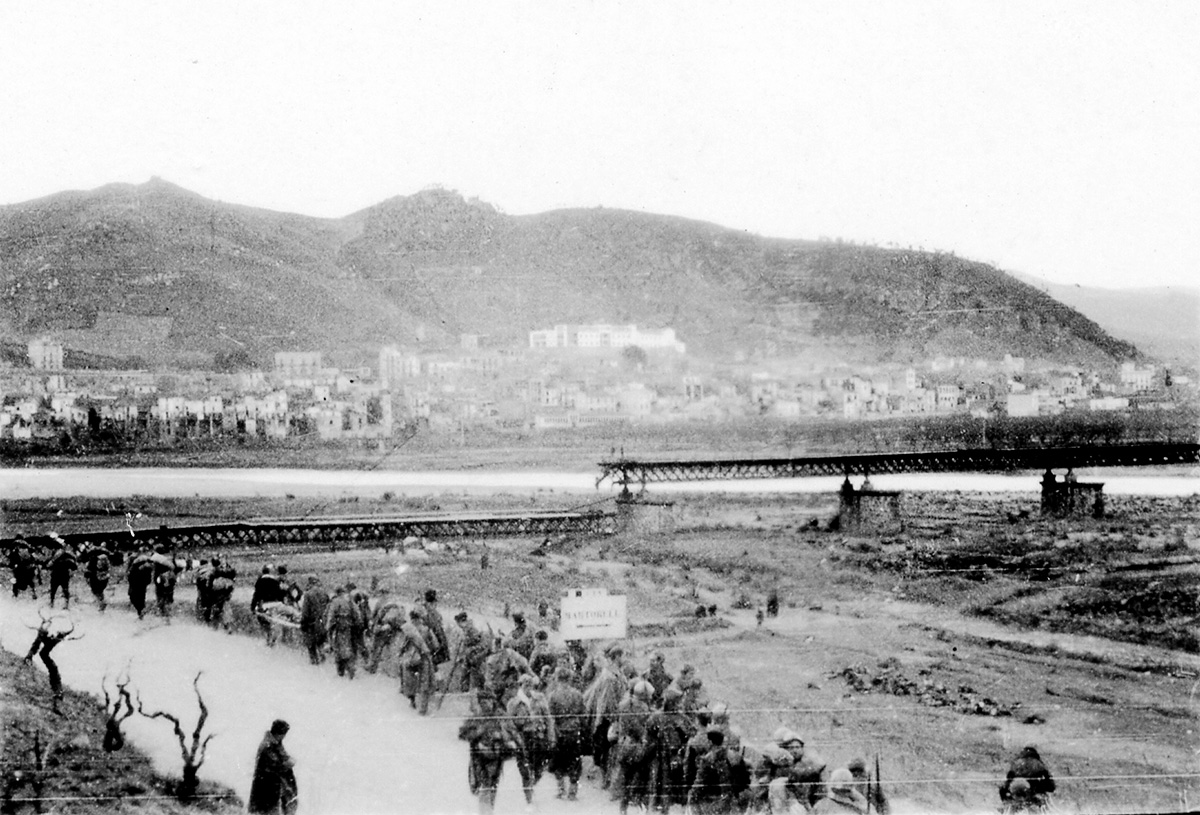
near Martorell; Nationalist troops approach a destroyed Llobregat bridge

In the very late hours General Saravia, commander of what was left of the GERO, gathered members of the press corps in his office. He informed them that Barcelona would be declared an open city, with no combat envisioned on its streets; he asked the journalists present the make the news public in their afternoon editions. The reservation was rather pointless, as on 25 January almost no newspapers, except La Vanguardia, would be issued. When he was making his statement, the Nationalists controlled almost the entire right bank of the Llobregat, from Manresa in the north to Martorell, Sant Andreu de la Barca, Pallejà, Sant Vicenç dels Horts, Sant Boi de Llobregat, to El Prat on the Mediterranean coast. They were at the outskirts of the city, in some points just 8 km from Plaça de Catalunya.

=== Wednesday, 25 January ===
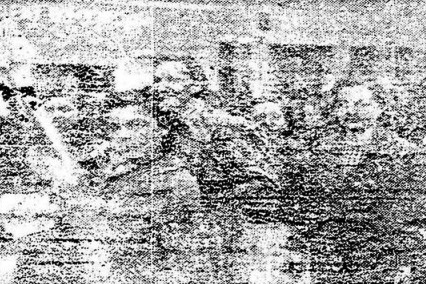
Women demonstrating; one of last photos from Republican Barcelona

Since the morning hours the first Nationalist patrols appeared on Serra de Collserola, hills immediately west of the city; Tagueña urgently had to move the staff of his XV corps from Sant Pere Martir to Sant Adrià de Besòs, north-east of Barcelona. His superior and commander of all frontline troops, Modesto, drove from his HQ in Vallvidrera to see Saravia; he also met fellow PCE heavyweights Uribe, Delicado, Mije, and Carrillo. When Modesto returned to Saravia few hours later, he found the premises empty; the general had already left for Girona. Comorera, Antón and Carrillo kept discussing deployment of particular combat groups, their objectives and possible scenarios, but this had no tangible impact on military developments. A last-minute initiative was this of general Asensio, who suggested that command of the city be transferred from the military to the Anarchists; Negrín –contacted over the phone- refused. Around midday the mayor, Hilari Salvadó i Castell, left the city.

The first cases of looting had already taken place on 23 January, but two days later it was widespread. Magazines in the Barcelona harbour, warehouses and large storage deposits came first, then looting started to affect high street shops, cafeterias (all closed by the time), empty institutions or any places where robbers expected to find any valuables. The usual booty in the city, which for months was suffering from food shortages and rationing, were foodstuffs: canned meat, chocolate, coffee, flour, oil, vinegar, sugar, beans and others, though people were also seen carrying rolls of textiles, paper, domestic or office machinery and other goods. Fights between individuals or groups competing for the same prize were breaking out. They ceased only during a bombing raid, as 6 German He-111s and 3 Italian SM-79s again targeted the port facilities. A British destroyer, anchored in Barcelona, took aboard the last British citizens and set sail towards Marseille, though the captain intended to return.

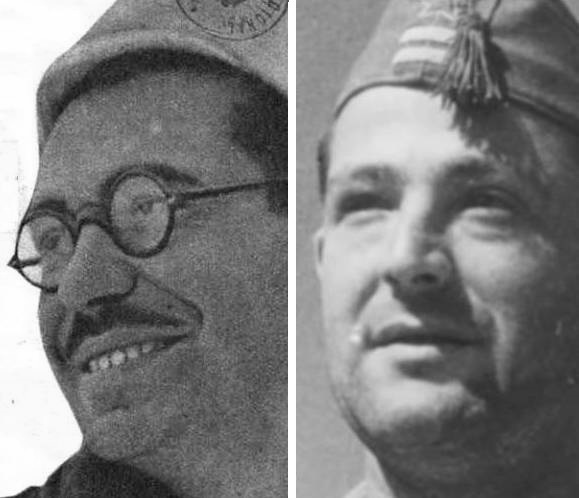
Taguena and Modesto, last commanders to leave Barcelona

Press staff were among the last to leave the city, and the news agency Fabra closed later during the day. La Vanguardia, the only newspaper which appeared on the street that morning, ran a huge headline El Llobregat puede ser el Manzanares de Barcelona, a reference to rebel troops having been defeated at the gates of Madrid in late 1936. The daily assumed a somewhat nationalist tone when in its sub-header it announced that Spanish troops heroically contain attacks of Italo-fascist divisions. Groups of youths from the JSU were constructing street barricades at spots indicated by Tagueña. It is not clear when the discharged commander of Barcelona Riquelme left the city. In the late evening Andre Malraux, Max Aub (who both worked in the local film studio on a documentary movie) and Palmiro Togliatti left the city. When night fell, except for Modesto and Tagueña there were no high military commanders in place.

=== Thursday, 26 January ===
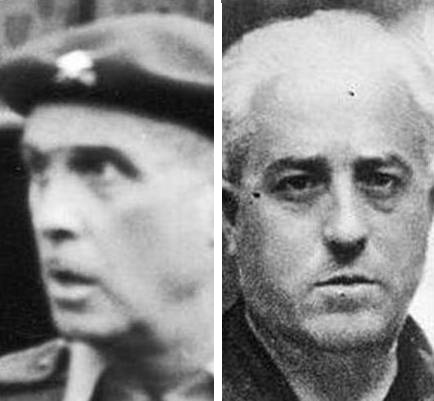
Solchaga and Yague, first commanders to enter Barcelona

According to contemporary accounts, the night of Wednesday 25 January to Thursday 26 January was a bizarre and unique experience. The city seemed uninhabited as streets were dark, silent, and covered in litter. In some areas, small groups were loading items on to makeshift vehicles in the hopes of a late evacuation. Patrols of armed men were walking without direction, while individuals with bags or cases on their backs with booty from looting were sneaking around. In certain areas, groups of youths erected barricades. Distant fire from small arms was heard on occasion, with echoes reverberating across empty streets.

Among the last organized Republican activities was the transport of prisoners; some departed from Barcelona during the very early hours of the day. The only municipal service operational was the fire brigade; one of its last interventions was in the JSU headquarters during the morning, when in an attempt to burn documentation the fire got out of control and engulfed the entire building. At the time Modesto nominated Tagueña –both residing in makeshift headquarters in Sant Adrià de Besos- as the one responsible for holding the frontline from Montjuïc to Serra de Collserola. However, this was of little relevance. Since early morning Carlist patrols from the Navarrese Corps of general Solchaga started to descend from Vallvidrera and Tibidabo hills to the Sarrià district. Somewhat later, but still prior to midday, sub-units of the Cuerpo de Marruecos of colonel Yagüe moved east of Esplugues. Resistance in trenches dug a few days earlier was overcome, and the Moroccans appeared in the district of Sants. Minor and isolated fighting took place in the hills west of Barcelona, mostly around Tibidabo.

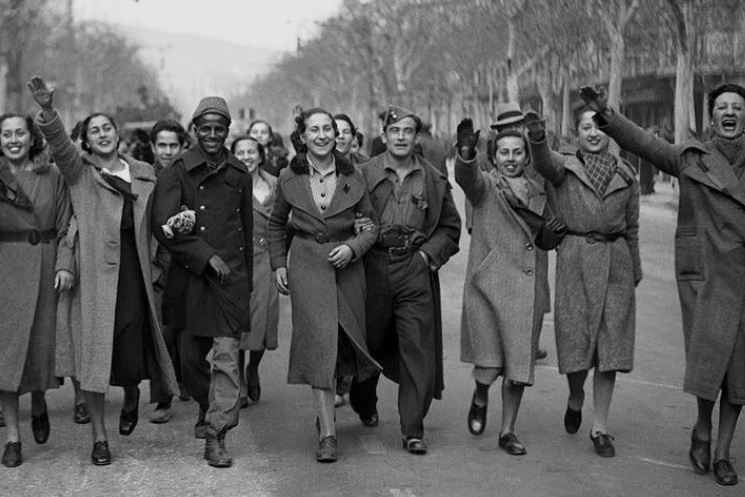
Diagonal: Young women celebrate the Nationalist entry to Barcelona

Around midday Nationalist patrols started to penetrate Avinguda Diagonal, while grouplets of Republican defenders –at times insulted by women– fled to the north. Some looting continued. Tagueña was still in Sant Adrià; he lost contact with whatever Republican units remained operational. Comorera was warned about Nationalist soldiers nearby while still in Hotel Ritz. In the early afternoon the first white flags started to appear on balconies and windows. In a few cases minor shootouts occurred where isolated groups of defenders –e.g. Mossos d'Esquadra at Plaça Borràs– offered resistance. In the late afternoon the Nationalists started to occupy major buildings, e.g. the town hall. The last organized defenders, including Tagueña and Comorera, left towards Besos. In the evening there were more and more people appearing on the streets, cheering the Nationalists. Among what the Nationalist press later dubbed as scenes of indescribable enthusiasm, instances of frenetic hysteria were by no means rare, with men and women on their knees kissing the rojigualda standards or uniform sleeves of Nationalist soldiers. Republican supporters preferred to stay at home. When night fell there were no islands of resistance, and Barcelona was entirely controlled by the Nationalists.

== Aftermath ==
=== Administration ===
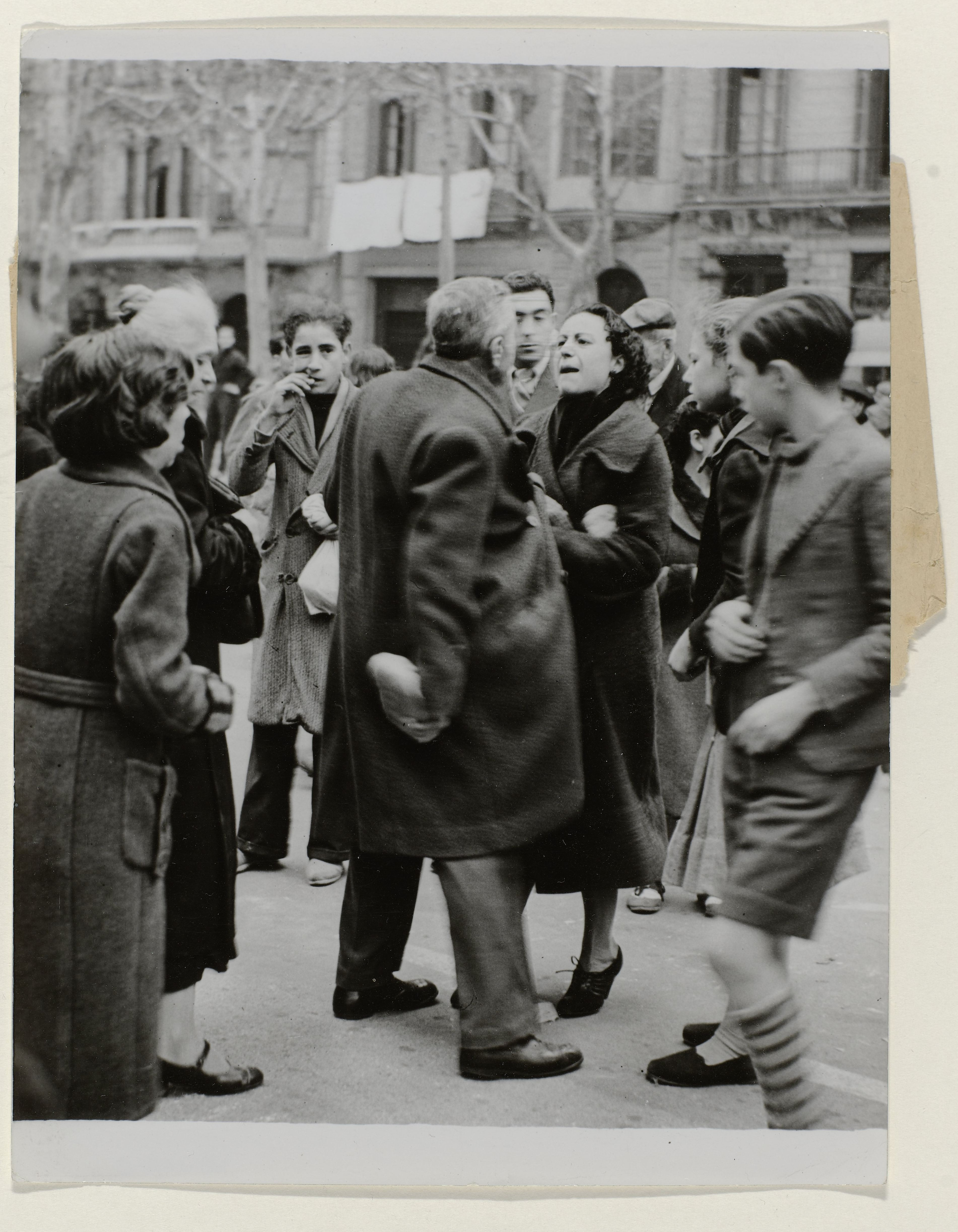
Barcelona, confrontation over food rationing

The minister of interior, Ramón Serrano Suñer, nominated the new mayor and the city council already on 23 January, this is 3 days before Nationalist troops entered the city. The alcaldia went to Miguel Mateu Pla, entrepreneur and member of the high Catalan bourgeoisie, not associated with any particular party before the war; he headed the ayuntamiento until 1945. The post of civil governor of the Barcelona province went to Wenceslao González Oliveros, a non-Catalan academic associated earlier with Alfonsism; after almost 2 years, in late 1940, he was replaced by a zealous Falangist and also non-Catalan, Antonio Correa Veglison, who would serve until the mid-1940s. The third most important civilian post in the province, jefatura of FET y de las JONS, was assumed by a Catalan lawyer and old-shirt Falangist, Mariano Calviño de Sabucedo, and the fourth, presidency of provincial diputacion, by a Catalan Alfonsist, Josep Maria Milà Camps, However, during first few months the key authority in Barcelona was Eliseo Álvarez-Arenas Romero, head of Servicios de Ocupación; it was a particular body, not set up anywhere else, which operated until 1 July 1939. The political amalgam emergent in early Francoist Barcelona was dominated by a coalition of Falangists and generic right-wing politicians, including the conservatives and the monarchists; the Carlists, who attempted to re-institutionalize their fairly strong pre-war network, were quickly marginalised by administrative means. Autonomy of Catalonia has been abolished already in April 1938, and the region was incorporated into the uniform national administrative structure; Catalan was driven out of public spaces.

=== Demography ===
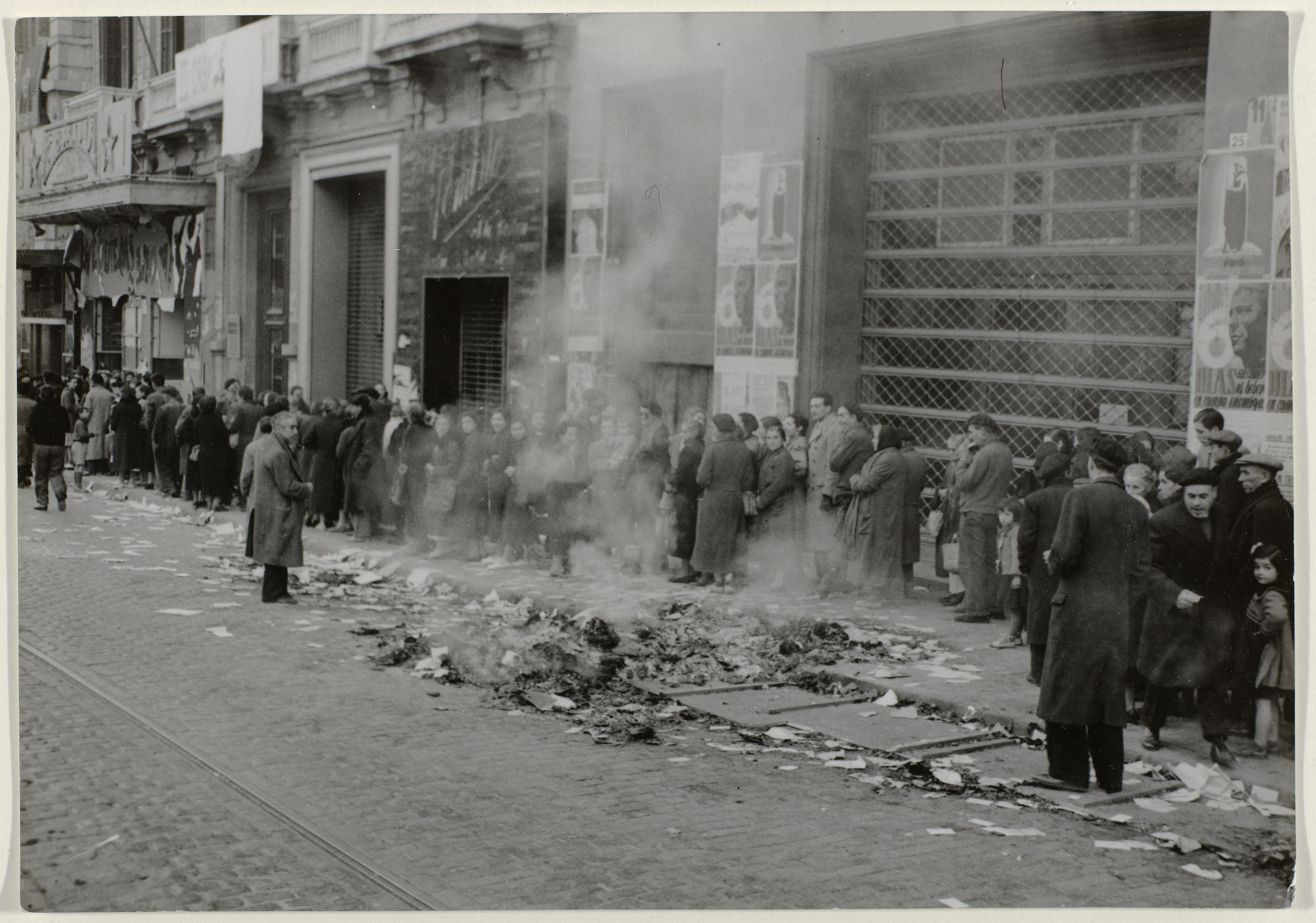
Queue in Barcelona; Republican posters still visible on the walls

The first Nationalist statistics revealed that there were 1,085,951 people registered as living in the city in 1939; this did not differ much from the pre-war figure of 1,062,157, yet was a massive change compared to the 1,311,335 registered in late 1938. The difference resulted from 2 factors. A large number of refugees from other parts of Spain, who sought shelter in Barcelona during the war, returned -or at times were forced to return- to their native locations. Some 60,000 citizens fled to France before the Nationalist takeover, though around 30,000 returned in the course of the following months. The birth rate, which during the war declined from a monthly average of 1,410 in 1936 to 1.133 in 1938, 937 in January 1939 and the record low of 597 in July 1939, recovered quickly; in February 1940 it was already 1,533 and kept growing; a similar trend was seen with marriages. In the post-war period an enormous peak was recorded for baptisms; with religious services resuming, children born during the 30 months of wartime Republican rule were christened. The mortality rate dropped; while it stood at some 1,250 per month in the mid-1930s, it grew to over 2,500 in last months of 1938 and reached the record high of 3,546 in January 1939 (combat-related deaths excluded); in the second half of 1939 the figure dropped to an average of 1,180. Economic growth attracted an increased influx of migrants from other regions of Spain; Catalonia was the region with the second-highest immigration figures, and in the 1950s immigration to Catalonia would exceed that of Madrid; the Catalan share of the overall national population was growing from 11% in 1940 to above 15% in late Francoism. However, in terms of quality of life Catalonia's advantage over other regions decreased, from 170% in 1930 to 159% in 1955.

=== Repression ===
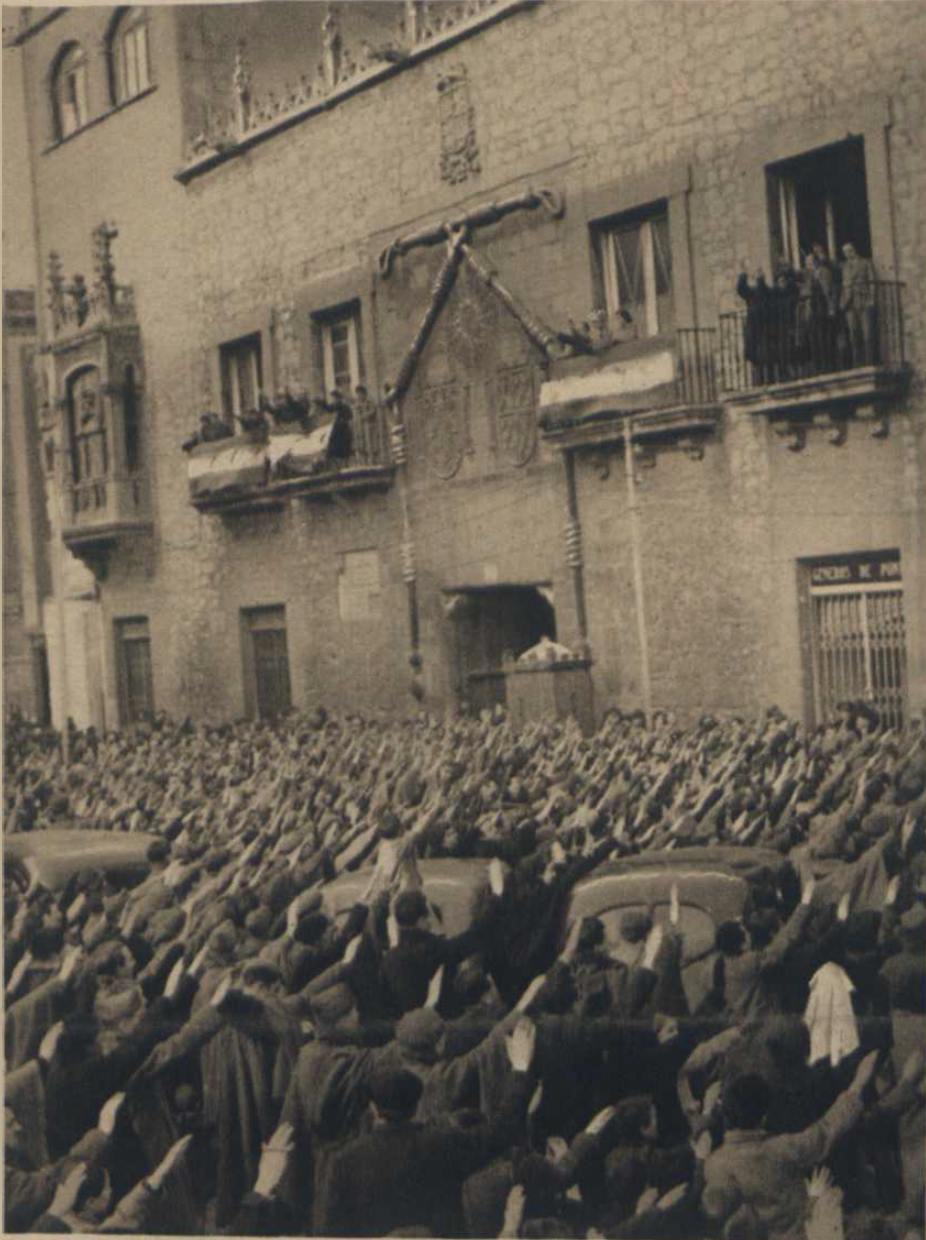
Barcelona, 28 January 1939

The role of public force of order was assumed by Columna de Orden Público y Policía de Ocupación, some 1,200 volunteers from Aragon above the usual conscription age; gradually they were being replaced by standard services. Institutionalized repression was aimed at former Popular Front supporters or those deemed supportive of Republican rule during the war. In the whole of Catalonia the number of executions, both juridical and extrajuridical, amounted to 4,000; a comparison to the scale of Republican terror in Barcelona is hardly possible, as estimates of the number of its victims range from 2,400 to 21,000. The category of "violent deaths", which apart from victims of accidents or crime comprised also war-related deaths and rearguard terror, was 2,542 for 1939, down from 4,213 in 1938 (attributed usually to Italian bombardments of Barcelona) and up from 1,373 in 1937 and 1,927 in 1936. The number of incarcerated in the province in 1940 was 27,300 (14,500 in Barcelona), the number of prosecution cases was 110,000 and the number of individuals prosecuted was 146,000; within this figure there were some 25,000 prosecuted by the Tribunal of Political Responsibilities. At least 135 academics were purged from universities; the respective number for town hall officials fired by 1940 was 1,450 (and all employees of the dissolved Generalitat). Personal sanctions affected various categories, including artists like the architect Josep Lluís Sert and the musician Pau Casals, though other recognized Catalan artists like Salvador Dalí or Eugenio d'Ors supported the new regime. The most symbolic case of repression was of the former president of autonomous Catalonia, Companys, who in October 1940 was trialled by the Barcelona military tribunal and executed in Montjuïc shortly afterwards.

=== Recovery ===
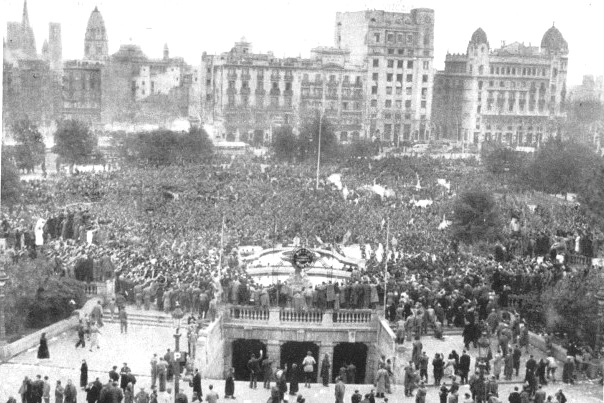
Nationalist public ceremony, Barcelona

Except some harbour facilities, heavily bombed by Nationalist aviation, the city infrastructure did not suffer major losses during the war; out of 60,000 buildings in the municipal inventory, only 3,000 were listed as damaged. Some 0.6m cubic metres of rubble had to be removed (in comparison, 22m was removed from Warsaw in 1945–1949 and perhaps even 25m from Breslau). Most damage was repaired by the early 1940s, though in some cases new streets -e.g. what is now Carrer de l'Almirall Cervera- were delineated in destroyed quarters. In some cases removing the damage took longer, e.g. the zoological garden re-opened in the mid-1940s. Municipal and provincial services resumed service almost immediately, e.g. the metro was re-opened on 2 February 1939 and train connections 3 days later. Much effort was dedicated to the restoration of churches, almost all damaged or otherwise vandalised, with priority given to the Catedral, la Sagrada Família, el Tibidabo and Pedralbes; in cases of totally destroyed houses of worship, religious services were held out in the open until full reconstruction. Economically, the city recovered fairly quickly from the wartime period. The provincial industrial output already exceeded that of 1935 in 1941. Catalonia developed faster than other regions, e.g. Barcelona consistently consumed more cement -a typical indicator of measuring dynamics of the construction business- than Madrid or Valencia, and at times even twice as much.

== See also ==
- Catalonia Offensive
- History of Barcelona
