= Enrique Fernández =

Enrique Fernández may refer to:

== Artist and entertainers ==
- Enrique Fernández Arbós (1863–1939), Spanish violinist and composer
- Enrique Fernández (director) (born 1953), Uruguayan filmmaker

== Sportspeople ==
- Enrique Fernández (footballer, born 1912) (1912–1985), Uruguay international football midfielder and manager
- Enrique Fernández (footballer, born 1944), Argentina international football midfielder
- Enrique Fernández (footballer, born 2003), Spanish football midfielder for Real Betis

== Other people ==
- Enrique Fernández Prado (1940–2018), Spanish businessman
- Enrique Fernández Heredia (fl. 1932–1938), Republican military commander in the Spanish Civil War
