= 84th Mixed Brigade =

84th Mixed Brigade 84.ª Brigada Mixta
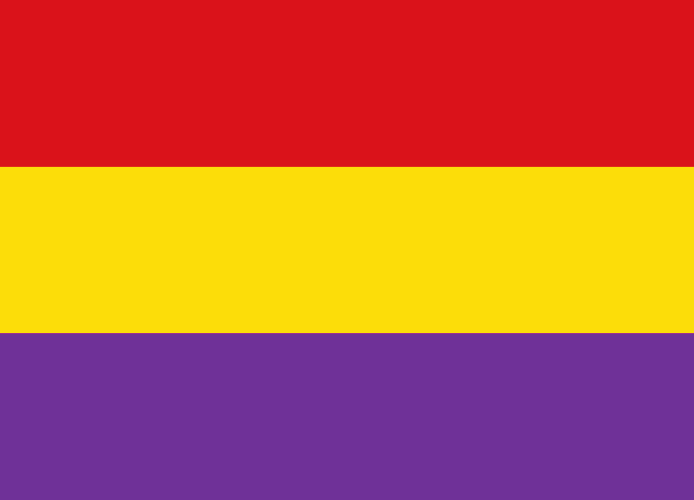
- Military flag of the Popular Army
- Active: March 1937 – January 1938 (1st unit); April 1938 – January 1939 (2nd unit)
- Country: Spain
- Branch: Spanish Republican Army - Infantry
- Type: Mixed Brigade
- Role: Home Defence
- Size: Four battalions: The 333, 334, 335 and 336
- Part of: 40th Division (1937 - 1938); 60th Division (1938 - 1939)
- Garrison/HQ: Valencia; Vallfogona
- Engagements: Spanish Civil War: Battle of Teruel (1st unit); Battle of the Segre (2nd unit); Battle of the Ebro (2nd unit)

Commanders
- Notable commanders: Benjamín Juan Iseli Andrés

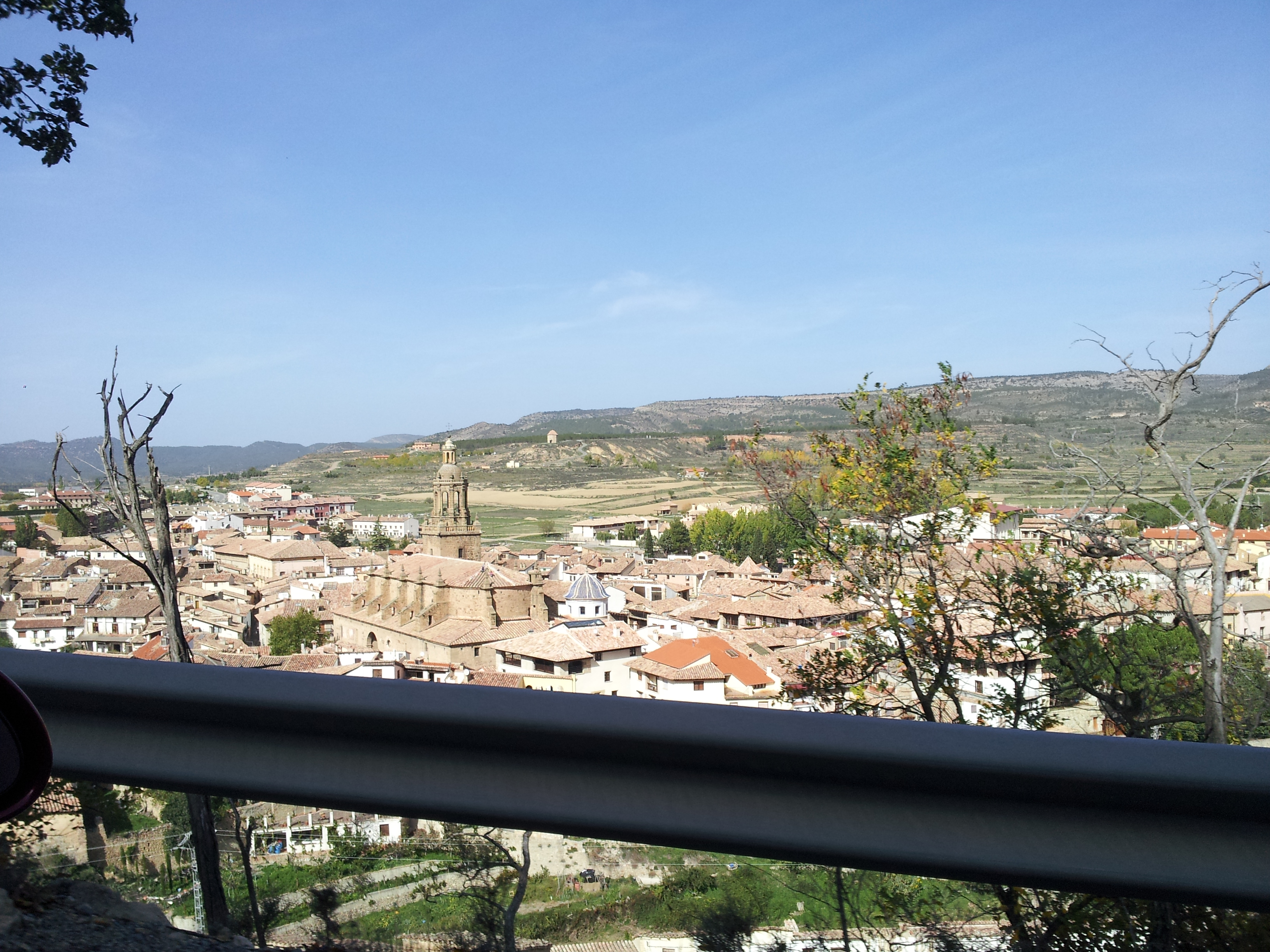
View of Mora de Rubielos where the 84th MB barely had time to recover before being recalled to the frontline.

The 84th Mixed Brigade (Spanish: 84.ª Brigada Mixta), was a mixed brigade of the Spanish Republican Army in the Spanish Civil War. It was formed in March 1937 with battalions of the Iron Column (Spanish: Columna de Hierro) and was disbanded after the tragic events at Mora de Rubielos when 46 soldiers were shot by firing squad in a decimation following the brigade's Battle of Teruel December combats in harsh winter conditions.

In April 1938 a new unit was established with the same number; the new mixed brigade took part in the Battle of the Segre and the Battle of the Ebro before vanishing in the debacle of the Catalonia Offensive.

== History ==
=== First unit and the Battle of Teruel ===
The 84th Mixed Brigade was one of the units that were established following the militarization of elements of the Iron Column that were located in the eastern sector of the Teruel Front. Most of its members were from anarchist background as well as soldiers of garrison regiments from Valencia. The mixed brigade was made up of the following battalions, all of which had nicknames:

- 333 "Largo Caballero"
- 334 "Azaña"
- 335 "Temple y Rebeldía"
- 336 "Infantería"

During the instruction period the unit was under the command of Infantry Commander Leopoldo Ramírez Jiménez. Under Ramírez the unit was made part of the 40th Division of the reserve of the Levantine Army. Once the instruction period was over Ramírez was relieved of his duty by Infantry Commander Miguel Ferrer Canet, who had previously led the 2nd Battalion of the 82nd Mixed Brigade. Ferrer's leadership of the unit was brief for the 84th Mixed Brigade ended up having four different leaders in little more than eight months, between its inception and December 1937. The next leader was Carabineros Commander Ángel Castaño Gutiérrez, who was followed by Militia Major Benjamín Juan Iseli Andrés. The cantonment of the unit was in the Celadas sector of the Teruel front, contributing to the siege of the Republican forces around the city since the onset of the war. However, the 84th Mixed Brigade did not take part in any important military operation during the long siege, except for a failed Republican offensive in April.

When the large-scale republican attack against Teruel began in December, the 40th Division led by Andrés Nieto Carmona was made part of the 20th Army Corps, which carried on its shoulders the main weight of the offensive. On 14 December the 84th Mixed Brigade launched an attack against enemy positions at the Escandón Pass, which it conquered two days later. On the 19 the brigade moved forward towards Teruel on the N-234 road seizing Castellar and Castralvo, arriving to Teruel town on 21 December. When the unit entered the town it was subject to determined attacks by the well-entrenched enemy and the men had to fight in harsh conditions of extreme cold. On Christmas eve the brigade tried to storm the Military Headquarters, which were fiercely defended by rebel Colonel Domingo Rey d'Harcourt. The street combats ended up in a bloodbath for the 84th Mixed Brigade, which at the end of the confrontation had over 600 casualties —about 25% of its total troops. On 31 December the much-battered brigade withdrew to the outskirts of Teruel for a break, entering the small town again the following day and holding its ground until the surrender of the last strongholds of rebel forces on 7 and 8 January.

==== The Mora de Rubielos events ====
After weeks of intense combats, the survivors of the much depleted 84th Mixed Brigade were sent behind Republican lines to Mora de Rubielos for a time of much needed rest. The rebel side, however, launched its vigorous mid-January 1938 counterattack and, lacking troops to put up an effective resistance, the Republican high command resorted to the desperate measure of recalling all available reserves, including the exhausted 84th Mixed Brigade, whose men barely had had time to recover.

When the brigade was summoned back to Teruel to defend the graveyard sector on 17 January —barely a week after the much needed break for its men, the 1st and the 2nd battalions were so exhausted that they refused to engage again in frontline combat, and the 4th battalion declined to relieve them when called to do so. Then the rebellion was harshly put down: On 20 January at dawn three sergeants and forty-three soldiers of the brigade were summarily executed by firing squad while other sixty members of the brigade awaited trial. On 21 January the fate of the brigade was sealed when an effort by the remaining and spent troops of the disgraced unit to take the strategic hill known as El Muletón ended in catastrophic failure. The Division Commander Andrés Nieto, a Communist who had once been mayor of Mérida, took responsibility for the behavior of the men while Brigade Commander Benjamín Iseli shrank away from facing the facts, pretending not to know about the mood of his troops. Even though the latter's attitude was not the direct cause of the disbandment of the 84th Mixed Brigade, it certainly had great influence in it. A few days later the brigade was officially broken up and its remaining members were scattered among units of the 39th Division. Thus, in a matter of two weeks, and despite the sacrifices of the 84th Mixed Brigade at Teruel, from having been exemplary frontline heroes its soldiers had been branded as disloyal and untrustworthy. In addition to the 46 soldiers executed, 80 more were sent as prisoners by the Republic to forced work camps for the remainder of the war.

=== Last unit ===
On 19 April 1938, the 123rd Mixed Brigade was renamed "84th Mixed Brigade" and became part of the 60th Division of the 18th Army Corps. Its cantonment was at Vallfogona and it was led by Militia Major Agustín Vilella Freixa. Its chief of staff was Militia Captain Benito García Freixas and its Commissar Juan Soler Muñoz. The first mission carried out by the renamed brigade was to move to the bridgehead at Balaguer in order to cover the sector between the road to Tàrrega and the Segre River. At the onset of the Battle of the Ebro it already joined the end of July combats and took up the first line facing Vilalba dels Arcs, in the zone between La Pobla de Massaluca and Cuatro Caminos. In this position it faced the relentless charges of the Francoist counteroffensive for eight days until it was forced to withdraw to Gaeta Hill (Vértice Gaeta). Finally the brigade lost that position on 21 August, ending up badly shattered. At the beginning of September the much depleted unit was withdrawn from the bridgehead and kept garrisoned at the Republican bank of the lower Ebro.

It is known that when the 84th Mixed Brigade reached Ivars d'Urgell on 5 December it had a new leader, Militia Major Luis de los Arcos Sáiz. There are no data, however, about its performance in the impending Catalonia Offensive, so that it probably fell apart before or during the chaotic northward rush that ended with the Republican military in the Northeast at the beginning of February 1939.

== See also ==
- Eastern Region Army Group
- Mixed Brigades
