= Juan Hernández Saravia =

Spanish military officer

- Born: 24 July 1880; Ledesma, Salamanca, Kingdom of Spain
- Died: 3 May 1962 (aged 81); Mexico
- Military career
- Allegiance: Kingdom of Spain (1897–1931); Spanish Republic (1931–1933, 1936–1939)
- Branch: Spanish Army; Spanish Republican Army
- Service years: 1897–1933; 1936–1939
- Rank: General
- Commands: Southern Army (1936); Levantine Army (1937); Eastern Region Army Group (1938–1939)
- Conflicts: Spanish Civil War: Battle of Teruel; Battle of Ebro; Catalonia Offensive

Juan Hernández Saravia (24 July 1880 – 3 May 1962) was a high-ranking Spanish military officer of the Republican government forces during the Spanish Civil War.

== Biography ==
Hernández Saravia was born into a bourgeois family, and continued a family tradition by enrolling at the artillery school in 1897. He opposed the dictatorship of Primo de Rivera. He was the chief of Azaña's military staff and worked as general co-ordinator to the minister of war. In August 1936 he was appointed minister of war, but was dismissed following the fall of Talavera in September.

In 1937 he was appointed the commander of the Army of Levante and he was Republican commander at the Battle of Teruel. In December 1937 he was promoted to general.

After Catalonia became an isolated enclave following the rebel Aragon Offensive in the spring of 1938, Hernández Saravia commanded the Eastern Region Army Group (Grupo de Ejércitos de la Región Oriental) and led the Republican Army during the overwhelming Francoist Catalonia campaign. Following the Fall of Barcelona on 27 January, Juan Hernández Saravia was relieved of his duties as leader of the Eastern Region Army Group, allegedly for his "defeatism" (derrotismo), but the real motives went far deeper. General Hernández Saravia had fallen from grace because his views had often conflicted with those of the Chief of the General Staff of the Central Region, Vicente Rojo, and the President of the Council of Ministers, Juan Negrín. Hernández Saravia had tried to replace Juan Modesto, the head of the Ebro Army, whom he saw as self-important and not up to the mark and hand over the command to Juan Perea, the more competent commander of the Eastern Army, but Modesto was protected by the highest leaders of the doomed Spanish Republic.

After the fall of the government, he lived in exile in France and later in Mexico, until his death.

== See also ==
- Eastern Region Army Group (GERO)
