= Battle of Teruel =

1937 Spain civil war battle

Coordinates: 40.350°N 1.100°W

- Part of the Spanish Civil War
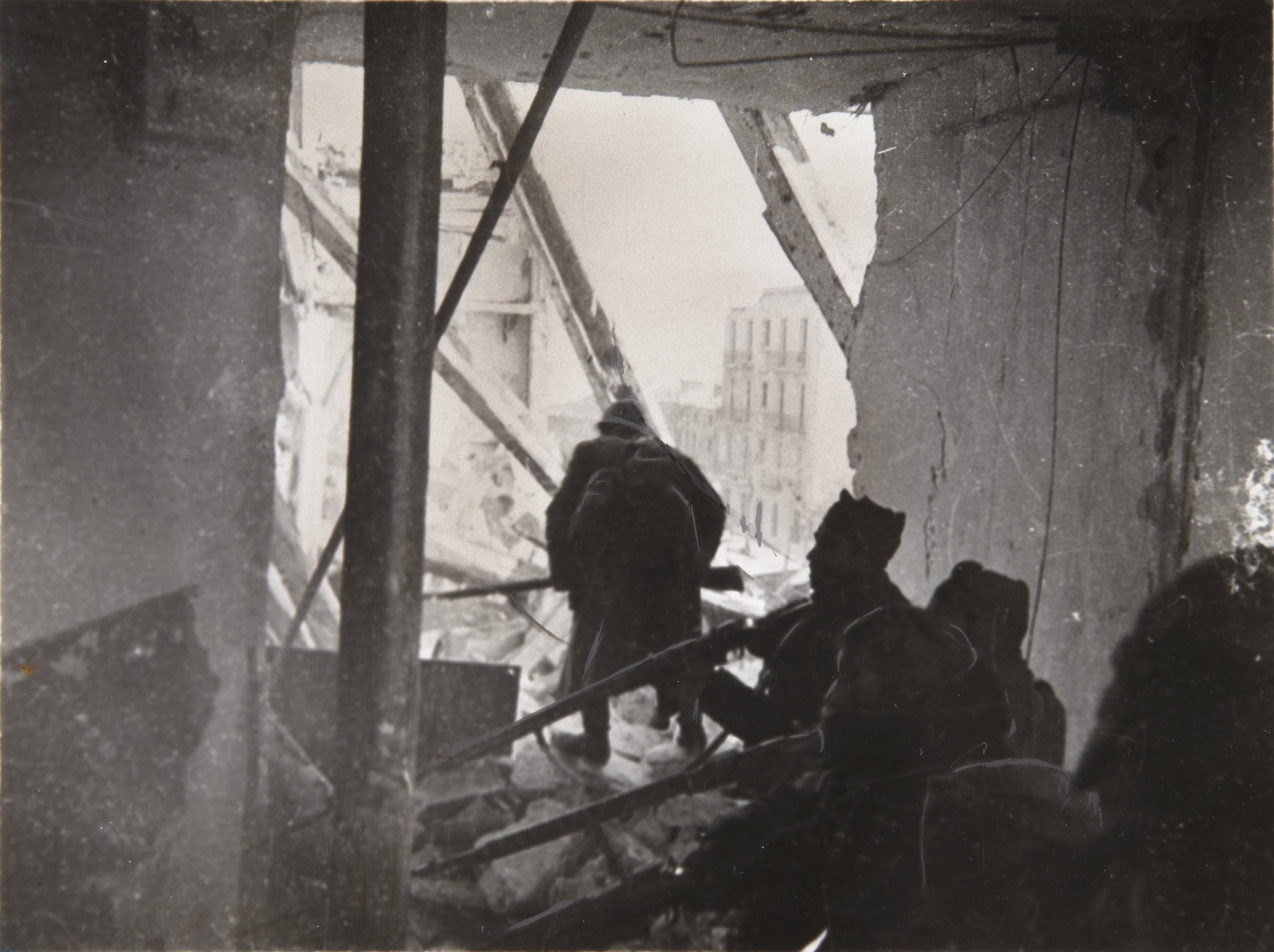
- Republican soldiers at Teruel, 1938
Date	15 December 1937 – 22 February 1938
Location	Teruel, Aragon, Spain
Result	Nationalist victory

Belligerents
(Second Spanish Republic) Spanish Republic	Nationalist Spain

Commanders and leaders
(Second Spanish Republic) Juan Hernández Saravia (Second Spanish Republic) Enrique Fernández Heredia (Second Spanish Republic) Juan Ibarrola (Second Spanish Republic) Vicente Rojo Lluch (Second Spanish Republic) Enrique Líster (Second Spanish Republic) El Campesino (Second Spanish Republic) Karol Świerczewski	(Spain) Francisco Franco (Spain) Antonio Aranda (Spain) José Enrique Varela (Spain) Juan Yagüe (Spain) Domingo Rey d'Harcourt (POW)

Strength
40,000 100,000	Teruel garrison: 4,000-less than 10,000 Reinforcements: 100,000

Casualties and losses
~60,000	~57,000

The Battle of Teruel was fought in and around the city of Teruel during the Spanish Civil War between December 1937 and February 1938, during the worst Spanish winter in 20 years. The battle was one of the bloodiest actions of the war, with the city changing hands several times by first falling to the Republicans and eventually being retaken by the Nationalists. In the course of the fighting, Teruel was subjected to heavy artillery and aerial bombardment. In the two-month battle, both factions together took 110,000 casualties.

With his superiority in men and material, the Nationalist leader Francisco Franco regained Teruel. This battle became the military turning point of the war.

== Background ==
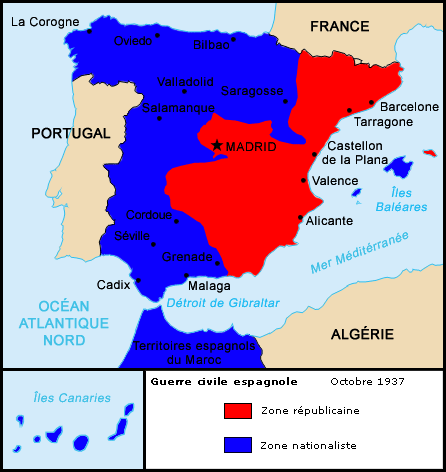
Spain in 1937 just before the Battle of Teruel. Note the Teruel salient south of Zaragoza. Blue is Nationalist Spain and Red is Republican Spain.

The Republic's decision to move against Teruel was motivated by several strategic priorities. Republican military leaders thought that Teruel was not strongly held and sought to regain the initiative by its capture. By 1937, the Teruel salient was similar to the fingernail on a finger of Nationalist territory inserted into Republican Spain, and its capture would shorten the lines of communication between central Republican Spain and Valencia on the coast. Teruel was surrounded on three sides by Republican Spain. In addition, Teruel was a symbol of Nationalist power on the Aragon front.

Indalecio Prieto, the Republic's Minister of War, wanted a spectacular victory to reflect well on his tenure and to show how the army could function under his reorganization. A victory at Teruel would also aid the government of Prime Minister Juan Negrín in its quest to take over the industries of Catalonia from their workers. Lastly, Republican intelligence learned that Franco intended to start a major offensive against Madrid in the Guadalajara sector on 18 December and so the Republicans wanted to divert the Nationalists away from the Madrid area. The Republic, therefore, started the battle on 15 December.

=== Terrain ===
Teruel, in southern Aragon, had a population of 20,000 and was the remote capital of a poor province. It had been fortified in 1170 to buffer the warring Moorish and Christian states. In 1937, it served essentially the same purpose by separating the Republicans in Valencia from the Nationalists in Zaragoza. Because of its elevation in the mountains (3,050 ft; 930 m), it usually has the lowest annual winter temperature in Spain. The town was a walled and mountain-ringed natural fortress on a high knoll above the confluence of the Turia and Alfambra rivers. It is surrounded by a geological potpourri of scragged gorges, tooth-shaped peaks and twisted ridge fingers. West of the town, the Calatayud highway runs up a slight gradient to a pancake-flat plain around the village of Concud, about 3 mi (4.8 km) away. A key position was the ridge to the west of the town known as La Muela de Teruel (Teruel's Tooth). Teruel's defensive position was much improved by previously prepared trenches and barbed wire because of its position protruding into Republican territory.

=== Combatants ===
The Spanish Republican Army was under the command of Juan Hernández Saravia, who had reorganised the army almost from scratch. The Republicans had a total of 100,000 men in two armies. The Army of the Levante was to conduct the main part of the assault supported by the Army of the East. Saravia wanted the coup de main against Teruel to be an all-Spanish operation without the assistance of the International Brigades. Among his commanders was the trustworthy and able communist commander Enrique Líster and so Saravia chose Lister's division to lead the first assault.

Colonel Domingo Rey d'Harcourt was the Nationalist commander at Teruel when the battle began. The Teruel salient had a Nationalist defending force of about 9,500 men, including civilians. After the attack began, Rey d'Harcourt eventually consolidated his remaining defenders into a garrison to defend the town. Teruel's Nationalist garrison numbered between 2,000 and 6,000 according to various estimates. The garrison numbered probably about 4,000, half of them civilians.

== Battle ==
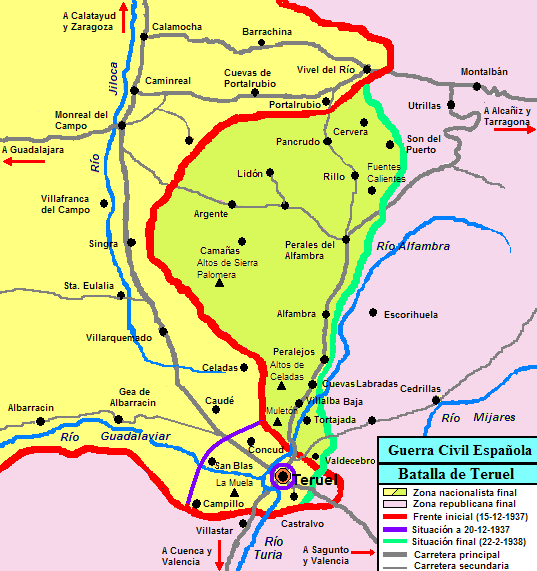
The red line in the map shows the front at the beginning of the battle. The purple line shows the front on 20 December, with Teruel surrounded by the Republicans. The green line shows the front at the end of the battle. La Muela, Teruel's Tooth, is west of the town. Click on the map to get a larger view.

Lister's Republican division attacked Teruel without any preliminary aerial or artillery bombardment while snow fell on 15 December 1937. Lister and his fellow commander, Colonel Enrique Fernández Heredia, moved to surround the town. They immediately gained a position on the heights of La Muela, and by evening, they encircled the city. Rey d'Harcourt pulled his defences into the town and, by 17 December, had given up trying to keep a foothold on La Muela. Francisco Franco, the Nationalist commander, finally decided on 23 December to aid the defenders at Teruel since he had decided that as a matter of policy, no provincial capital would be allowed to fall to the Republicans. Such a loss would be a political failure, and Franco determined to make no concession. He had just started a major offensive at Guadalajara, and the relief of Teruel forced him to abandon that offensive, much to the disgust of his Italian and German allies. The Nationalist relief of Teruel also signified that Franco had given up the idea of a knockout blow to end the war and had accepted a long war of attrition, to be won by the force of arms and by foreign assistance.

=== Republican advances and siege ===
By 21 December, the Republican forces were in the town. Ernest Hemingway and two journalists, one being The New York Times correspondent Herbert Matthews, accompanied the troops entering Teruel. Rey d'Harcourt, the Nationalist commander, pulled his remaining defenders back to an area in which he could make a last stand in the southern part of the town. By Christmas Day, the Nationalists still occupied a cluster of four key points: the Civil Governor's Building, the Bank of Spain, the Convent of Santa Clara and the seminary. The Republicans' Radio Barcelona announced that Teruel had fallen, but Rey d'Harcourt and the remnants of the 4,000 man garrison still held out. The siege continued with the fighting being hand to hand and building to building. The Republicans would bombard a building with artillery and then move in with the bayonet.

=== Nationalist relief attempts ===
Franco cancelled the Guadalajara offensive on 23 December, but the relief force could not begin its attack until 29 December. Franco could only send messages to Rey d'Harcourt to hold out at all costs. In the meantime, the Republicans pressed home their attack in atrocious weather. The Nationalist counterattack began on schedule on 29 December, with the experienced Generals Antonio Aranda and José Enrique Varela in command. The German Condor Legion covered the attack. By New Year's Eve, a supreme effort allowed the Nationalists to be on the La Muela Heights and actually to break into the town and to take the bullring and the railway station, but they could not hold their gains in the town. Then, the weather actually turned for the worse, with the start of a four-day blizzard in which 120 cm of snow fell and temperatures of −18 °C occurred. The fighting ground to a halt as guns and machines froze, and the troops suffered terribly from frostbite. The Nationalists suffered the most, as they did not have warm clothing. Many amputations were performed to remove frostbitten limbs.

Franco continued to pour in men and machines, and the tide of the battle slowly started to turn. However, the Republicans pressed home their siege, and by New Year's Day in 1938, the defenders of the convent were dead. The Civil Governor's Building fell on 3 January, but Rey d'Harcourt fought on. The attackers and the defenders were on different stories of the building and fired at each other through holes in the floors. The defenders now had no water, few medical supplies and little food. Their defences were piles of ruins, but they continued to hold out. The Nationalist advances stalled because of the weather, and finally, on 8 January, Rey d'Harcourt surrendered with Anselmo Polanco the Bishop of Teruel, at his side. Teruel had fallen to the Republicans.

Just over a year later, the Republicans, in one of their last acts of the war, killed Rey d'Harcourt and the bishop, along with 41 other prisoners in February 1939. After Rey d'Harcourt's surrender, the civilian population of Teruel had been evacuated, and the Republicans became the besieged and the Nationalists the besiegers.

=== Nationalist counteroffensive ===
After Rey d'Harcourt's surrender, the Nationalist buildup began to tell on the Republican forces. With the weather clearing, the Nationalists started a new advance on 17 January 1938. Two days later, the Republican leadership finally gave up its scruples about the Battle of Teruel being an all-Spanish operation and ordered the International Brigades to join the struggle. Many of the units had been in the area but in reserve. Celebrities and politicians meanwhile entertained and visited the units. The US communist-sympathising singer Paul Robeson sang for them on Christmas Eve with a repertoire that included L'Internationale and ended with Ol' Man River. Future British Prime Minister Clement Attlee, the left-wing Labour politician Ellen Wilkinson and future Labour government official and diplomat Philip Noel-Baker visited a British unit.

Both high commands were now in heated trains near the battlefield and directing their troops in the final part of the battle. Slowly but surely, the Nationalists advanced, and the La Muela heights fell to them. The Republican forces launched fierce counterattacks on 25 January and the next two days, but gains were temporary. Finally, on 7 February, the Nationalists attacked north of Teruel. That was a weak area since most Republican forces had been concentrated to the south around Teruel itself. A massive cavalry charge, one of the last in the history of warfare (there were one or two exceptions near the Caspian Sea during World War II), broke the Republican defences and scattered them. Aranda and Yagüe swiftly advanced and the victory was complete. The Nationalists took thousands of prisoners and thousands of tons of supplies and munitions. The Republicans ran for their lives if they could.

The final battle began on 18 February. Aranda and Yagüe cut off the town from the north and then surrounded it, as the Republicans had accomplished in December. On 20 February, Teruel was cut off from the former Republican capital in Valencia, and with the Nationalists entering the town, Hernández Saravia gave the order for withdrawal. Most of the army escaped before the route was cut off, but about 14,500 men were trapped. The colourful communist Republican commander El Campesino was surrounded but eventually broke out to escape. He always claimed that Lister and other communist commanders had left him to his fate in the hope that he would be killed or captured. The Nationalists finally recaptured Teruel on 22 February.

The Nationalists found 10,000 Republican corpses in Teruel after the battle was over.

== Aftermath ==
The Battle of Teruel exhausted the resources of the Republican Army. The Spanish Republican Air Force could not replace the airplanes and arms that it had lost at the Battle of Teruel. On the other hand, the Nationalists concentrated the bulk of their forces in the east and prepared to drive through Aragon into Catalonia and the Levante. Franco had the edge on resupply, as the Nationalists now controlled the efficiently run industrial might in the Basque Country. The Republican government, however, had to leave the armament industry in Catalonia in the hands of the anarchists. One anarchist observer reported, "Notwithstanding lavish expenditures of money on this need, our industrial organization was not able to finish a single kind of rifle or machine gun or cannon...." Franco's retaking of Teruel was a bitter blow to the Republic after the high hopes that had been engendered by the city's capture. It also removed the last obstacle to Franco's breakthrough to the Mediterranean Sea.

Franco wasted little time and began the Aragon Offensive on 7 March 1938. The Republic had withdrawn its best troops to replenish them after the loss of Teruel on 22 February, and the Republicans, still reeling from the heavy losses at Teruel, offered little resistance. The Nationalists rolled through Aragon, entered Catalonia and Valencia Province and reached the sea. By 19 April 1938, they controlled 60 km of coastline and so divided the Republic into two.

Laurie Lee, a British poet and writer who, by his account, served in the International Brigade, summed up the Republican strategy of attacking Teruel: "The gift of Teruel at Christmas had become for the Republicans no more than a poisoned toy. It was meant to be the victory that would change the war; it was indeed the seal of defeat".

== Casualties ==
Casualties from the Battle of Teruel are difficult to estimate. The Nationalist relief force lost about 14,000 dead, 16,000 wounded and 17,000 sick. In the original Teruel defensive force, including the garrison, casualties were about 9,500, nearly all of whom were dead or captured, which gives a total of 56,500 casualties for the Nationalists. The Republicans lost a large number of prisoners. On the 20 January 1938, 46 men of the Republican 84th Mixed Brigade were executed by firing squad at Mora de Rubielos. The reason for the brigade's decimation was due to the brigade's poor performance in the harsh winter combat actions in the later stages of the battle and the soldiers of the brigade being branded as disloyal and untrustworthy. Round figures would be Nationalists 57,000 and Republicans 60,000, for a total of about 110,000.

== Celebrities ==
Mathews, Hemingway, Robeson and the British politicians have been mentioned previously, and the battle certainly attracted many other such celebrities. One of them was the Soviet spy Kim Philby, who was nominally a correspondent for The Times covering the war from the Nationalist side. Evidently, he was already under Moscow's orders in Spain but wrote glowing reports about Franco. Near Teruel in December 1937, a shell hit an automobile in which Philby and three other journalists (Bradish Johnson, Eddie Neil and Ernest Sheepshanks) were riding. Philby was the only survivor. Franco personally decorated Philby, who was greatly exhilarated.

== See also ==
- Man's Hope (French: L'Espoir), a 1937 novel by André Malraux which deals with the battle
- Espoir: Sierra de Teruel, a film based on the Malraux novel
- List of Spanish Nationalist military equipment of the Spanish Civil War
- List of Spanish Republican military equipment of the Spanish Civil War
