= Manuel Tagüeña =

Spanish military officer

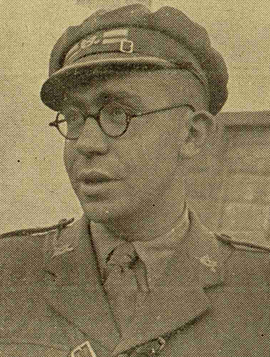
- Born: Manuel Tagüeña Lacorte; 1913
- Died: 1971 (aged 57–58)
- Spouse: Carmen Praga
- Military career
- Allegiance: (Second Spanish Republic) Spanish Republic
- Branch: Army
- Service years: 1936–1939
- Rank: Colonel
- Commands: Mixed Brigade (1936), Division, 15th Army Corps (1938–9).
- Conflicts: Spanish Civil War: Siege of Madrid; Aragon Offensive; Battle of the Ebro; Catalonia Offensive; Final offensive of the Spanish Civil War

Manuel Tagüeña Lacorte (1913–1971) was a Spanish military officer of the Spanish Republican Army.

== Biography ==
Before the Spanish Civil War, he was a member of the socialist youth and studied mathematics and physics at Madrid University. In July 1936 he led a militia column in the Somosierra front, in August on the Tagus front and took part in the defense of Madrid. He joined the PCE in November 1936 and was one of the first commanders of the mixed brigades. He rose through the ranks from company to army corps commander and he was promoted to Colonel. He was one of the Republican commanders in the retreat of Aragon. In the battle of the Ebro and in the Catalonia Offensive, he led the XV Army Corps of Modesto's Army of the Ebro. and during the fight for Barcelona. After Casado’s coup in March 1939 he fled from the Monòver airfield to France.

After the war, he came to Mexico, left the PCE and died there in 1971.

While he was in Mexico he wrote the book "Testimonio de dos guerras" (Testimony of two wars) in which he explains his experiences in the Spanish Civil War and World War II. His wife, Carmen Praga also wrote a book "Antes que sea tarde" (Before it's late) about his husband in 1966

== Bibliography ==
- Beevor, Antony. The battle for Spain. The Spanish civil war, 1936–1939. Penguin Books. 2006. London. ISBN 978-0-14-303765-1.
- Jackson, Gabriel. The Spanish Republic and the Civil War, 1931–1939. Princeton University Press. 1967. Princeton. ISBN 978-0-691-00757-1
- Preston, Paul. The Spanish Civil War. Reaction, revolution & revenge. Harper Perennial. 2006. London. ISBN 978-0-00-723207-9, ISBN 0-00-723207-1
- Thomas, Hugh. The Spanish Civil War. Penguin Books. 2001. London. ISBN 978-0-14-101161-5
