= Decimation (punishment) =

Ancient Roman military punishment killing a tenth of a unit

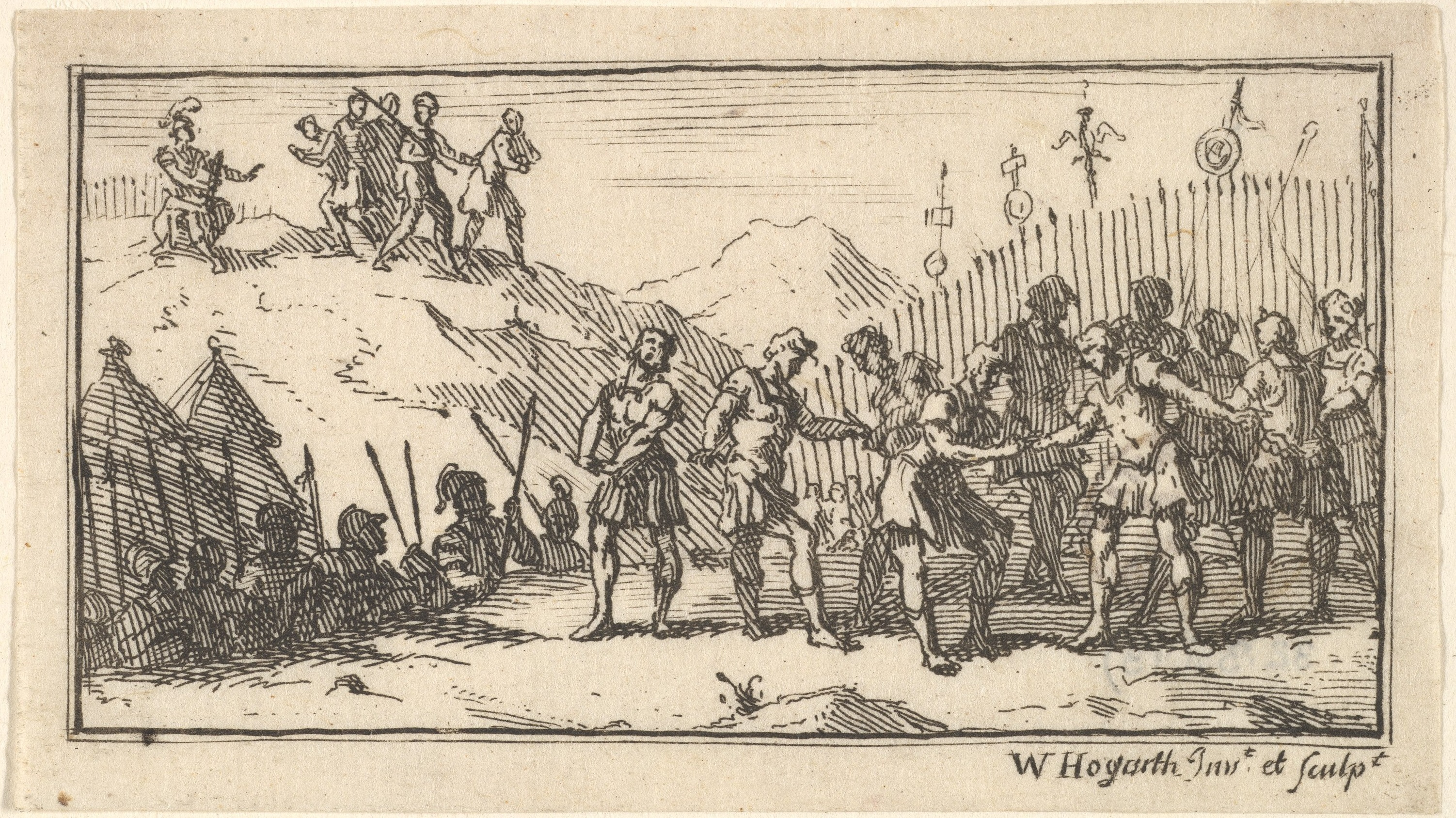
Decimation. Etching by William Hogarth in Beaver's Roman Military Punishments (1725)

In the military of ancient Rome, decimation (from Latin decimatio 'destruction of a tenth') was a form of military discipline in which every tenth man in a group was executed by members of his cohort. The discipline was used by senior commanders in the Roman army to punish units or large groups guilty of capital offences, such as cowardice, mutiny, desertion, and insubordination, and for pacification of rebellious legions.

The historicity of the punishment during the early and middle republic is questioned, and it may be an ahistorical rhetorical construct of the late republic. Regardless, the first well-attested instance was in 72 BC during the war against Spartacus under the command of Marcus Licinius Crassus. Further instances followed in the next century, mostly occurring during times of civil strife, before falling out of use after AD 69. There is evidence of the punishment's revival in the post-classical world, such as during the Thirty Years' War and World War I.

In modern English, the word is used most commonly to mean total destruction or annihilation.

== In ancient Rome ==
Decimation was the most extreme punishment of the Roman army, where a tenth of a unit that had proven its cravenness was killed. The Romans believed that it had ancient roots in the early republic – the fifth and fourth centuries – and the theoretically unlimited powers of the Roman magistrate militae ("on campaign"). The procedure for decimation, as described by Polybius, involved a soldiers' assembly before the tribunes. Then, of the units adjudged cowardly, lots were taken such that a tenth of the men were condemned. Their comrades then killed them with clubs before the survivors were then further punished with barley rations and required to bivouac outside the fortified camp.

The practice was rare: there are only eleven recorded instances. Five of them date to the late republic from its revival in 72 BC with a further four during the triumviral and civil wars prior to Actium.

=== Questionable historicity ===
There is a single instance recorded by Livy that predates the middle republic, that of Appius Claudius Crassus Inregillensis Sabinus in 471 BC, but anachronistic elements of the narrative there suggest ahistoricity. The middle republican writer Polybius, however, in a detailed narrative, suggests that by the middle republic it was established, if not in practice at least otherwise, as a rhetorical construct. Two other instances are reported in Frontinus but are undated. Associated with the careers of Fabius Rullianus and an unknown Aquilius, these events (if historical) could not have taken place after 259 BC.

Literary evidence relating to punishment for military offences in the middle republic generally indulges in rhetorical exaggerations. If any instances of decimatio occurred between c. 315 BC and the historical instance under Crassus in 72, they were likely small enough not to be recorded. Indeed, the Polybian narrative suggests counts of victims fewer than twenty. If expanded by a factor of ten, the units involved were small and did not exceed c. 200 men. The presence of other non-lethal punishments meted for cowardice and lapses of military discipline – eg demotion, exile of Sicily, subsistence on barley rations, pay deductions, etc – that are well documented in the sources of the period also suggest that decimatio was essentially a rhetorical myth.

By the early second century BC, the extension of provocatio rights to the military also made it illegal for magistrates to kill or scourge their citizen soldiers, with similar rights also extended late in the second century to allied soldiers under Roman command. Cases of soldiers collectively resisting mass punishments and the necessity of their active participation also suggest that decimation was not at all commonly practicable. Moreover, actual practice of decimation would have alienated Roman citizen voters from the presiding general, who was accountable before both the law courts and the voters.

=== Revival during the first century ===
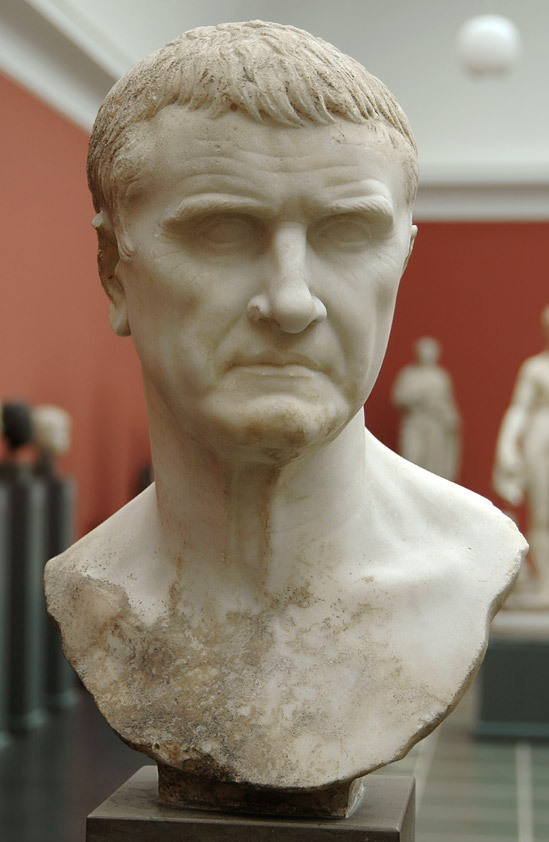
Bust traditionally identified as depicting Marcus Licinius Crassus

The first historical instance of decimation was in 72 BC under the command of Marcus Licinius Crassus during the Third Servile War. A unit of 500 men who fled from battle was decimated, with some fifty men executed. The narratives in Appian that Crassus decimated either two legions or his entire army (producing fatalities of around 1,000 and 4,000 respectively) are rejected as exaggerations.

The historian Michael Taylor identifies three major factors for this revival. First, the war being fought was against a slave revolt and therefore constituted a genuine emergency for the Roman state, especially after the defeat of that year's consuls' armies. Second, the ascendency of the Sullan regime in the aftermath of the recent civil war and its proscriptions may have set a precedent for ignoring citizen provocatio rights against arbitrary punishment. Third, there was at the time an elite antiquarian intellectual movement which may have suggested to Crassus the hitherto unprecedented option to reviving a punishment last used, if at all, centuries previously. Indeed, by the first century BC, the Romans had no knowledge of the practice's origins. The exigencies of the moment may have been sufficient to insulate Crassus from any social or political punishment for his unprecedented actions, which may have also set the precedent for ignoring provocatio rights on campaign, even if contrary to law.

After Crassus' use in 72 BC, the next possible instances were under Julius Caesar in 49 BC and Mark Antony in 44. However, both were applied only to small groups (in the former killing a tenth of the 120 ringleaders of a mutiny) or with a smaller proportion (in the latter Cicero describes only a targeted killing of supposedly disloyal centurions). Further instances appear during the civil war where Caesar's soldiers demand decimation to forego demobilisation in the aftermath of mutiny or defeat. In these instances, decimation was brought up essentially to demonstrate absolute loyalty to Caesar, who in all cases refused. The latter instance, if Appian is to be believed, also failed to restore discipline, instead increasing anger against Antony's command. A further instance in 39 BC under Gnaeus Domitius Calvinus, proconsular governor of Spain, is documented in Dio: however, the more contemporary source Velleius Paterculus reports only the execution of the fleeing unit's commander.

The next firmly documented instance was in 36 BC when Mark Antony decimated two cohorts after defeats against the Parthians, producing some 80 fatalities. Plutarch's biography attests that after a defeat in Media:

Antony was enraged, and visited those who had played the coward with what is called decimation. That is, he divided the whole number of them into tens, and put to death that one from each ten upon whom the lot fell. For the rest he ordered rations of barley instead of wheat.

A second instance follows in 34 BC under Octavian for a unit which fled during his campaign in Illyricum. After this instance in 34, over fifty years elapse before the next under Lucius Apronius c. AD 18–20 for defeats in Numidia and then another fifty years elapse to Galba's usage during the Year of the Four Emperors against a unit of soldiers who refused to be demoted to naval service.

=== Late antiquity ===
G. R. Watson notes that "its appeal was to those obsessed with nimio amore antiqui moris" – that is, an excessive love for ancient customs – and notes, "decimation itself, however, was ultimately doomed, for though the army might be prepared to assist in the execution of innocent slaves, professional soldiers could hardly be expected to cooperate in the indiscriminate execution of their own comrades". After the Principate, the punishment also falls into obscurity until late antiquity, when it may have been used by the emperor Julian during his Persian campaign. The emperor Macrinus instituted a less harsh centesimatio, the execution of every 100th man.

The Eastern Roman Emperor Maurice forbade in his Strategikon the decimatio and other brutal punishments. According to him, punishments where the rank and file saw their comrades dying by the hands of their own brothers-in-arms could lead to a collapse of morale. Moreover, it could seriously deplete the manpower of the fighting unit.

== Post-classical instances ==
=== 16th century ===
The Huguenot garrison of Brouage surrendered to Royalist forces in August 1577 during the French Wars of Religion. When the 800 survivors arrived at La Rochelle the city officials, judging their surrender to have been premature, decimated them.

=== 17th century ===
Von Sparr's cuirassier regiment in Gottfried Heinrich Graf zu Pappenheim's corps fled the field during the 1632 Battle of Lützen of the Thirty Years' War. The imperial commander, Wallenstein, appointed a court martial, which directed the execution of the officer in command, Colonel Hagen, together with Lt Col Hofkirchen, ten other officers and five troopers. They were beheaded with the sword, while two men found guilty of looting the baggage were sentenced to a less honourable death, by hanging. The remaining troopers were decimated, one in every ten cavalrymen being hanged; the others were assembled beneath the gallows, beaten, branded and declared outlaws. Their standards were burned by an executioner after the emperor's monogram had been cut from the fabric.

Similarly, during the Battle of Breitenfeld (1642), near Leipzig, Colonel Madlo's cavalry regiment was the first that fled without striking a blow. This was followed by the massive flight of other cavalry units, an early turning point in the battle. It ended in a decisive victory for the Swedish Army under the command of Field Marshal Lennart Torstenson over an Imperial Army under Archduke Leopold Wilhelm of Austria and his deputy Ottavio Piccolomini, Duke of Amalfi.

Leopold Wilhelm assembled a court-martial in Prague which sentenced the Madlo regiment to exemplary punishment. Six regiments, which had distinguished themselves in the battle, were assembled fully armed, and surrounded Madlo's regiment, which was severely rebuked for its cowardice and misconduct, and ordered to lay down its arms at the feet of General Piccolomini. When they had obeyed this command, their ensigns (flags) were torn in pieces; and the general, having mentioned the causes of their degradation, and erased the regiment from the register of the imperial troops, pronounced the sentence that had been agreed upon in the council of war, condemning the colonel, captains and lieutenants to be beheaded, the ensigns (junior officers) to be hanged, the soldiers to be decimated and the survivors to be driven in disgrace out of the army.

Ninety men (chosen by rolling dice) were executed at Rokycany, in western Bohemia, now in the Czech Republic, on December 14, 1642 by Jan Mydlář (junior), the son of Jan Mydlář, the famous executioner from Prague. On the first day of the execution, the regiment's cords were broken by the executioner. On the second day, officers were beheaded and selected men hanged on the trees on the road from Rokycany to Litohlavy. Another version says that the soldiers were shot, and their bodies hanged from the trees. Their mass grave is said to be on the Black Mound in Rokycany, which commemorates the decimation to this day.

=== 19th and 20th century ===
On September 3, 1866, during the Battle of Curuzu, during the Paraguayan War, the Paraguayan 10th Battalion fled without firing a shot. President Francisco Solano López ordered the decimation of the battalion, which was accordingly formed into line and every tenth man shot.

In 1914, in France, there was a case in which a company of Tunisian tirailleurs (colonial soldiers) refused an order to attack and was ordered decimated by the divisional commander. This involved the execution of ten men.

Italian general Luigi Cadorna, when he was commander-in-chief of the Italian Army during the First World War used both decimation and summary executions of stragglers for units that retreated without orders or fled the field of battle. It was also used to punish offences by units when determining the ringleaders was not possible. During the war there were at least five cases of decimation, with about a dozen soldiers killed in each case. Most of the men executed by Cadorna's harsh discipline were, however, by the form of the summary executions of individual stragglers. The first well-documented incident was in May 1916, when twelve men (including an officer and three sergeants) were drawn by lot and shot for having been part of a unit that fled when under attack. The commanding officer who undertook the summary executions – which did not have to be reported up the chain of command before being executed – was commended by Cadorna. The most famous instance of decimation under Cadorna's command was the killing, in two groups on 16 July 1917, of sixteen and twelve soldiers from the 6th company of the 142nd regiment of the Catanzaro brigade. The first were killed after the brigade rebelled during the night; the following twelve were killed for having fired on other Italian troops. All of the men were selected for death by lot. After the significant Italian defeat at the Battle of Caporetto in 1917, Cadorna was sacked and the new Italian commander-in-chief immediately ended the practice; this harsh discipline, exemplified by decimation, in Italian ranks was regardless ineffective at creating an effective army.

During the German Revolution of 1918–1919, 29 men from the Volksmarinedivision were executed after 300 men turned up to receive their discharge papers and back pay. The Red Army also engaged in decimation during the Russian Civil War. By May 1920, Leon Trotsky had twice ordered decimation, with the killing of every tenth man in two occasions where units had retreated without orders on the Volga front. The practice in the Red Army ended after 1920.

Decimation can be also used to punish the enemy. In 1918, during the Finnish Civil War, White troops, after conquering the Red city of Varkaus, summarily executed around 80 captured Reds in what became known as the Lottery of Huruslahti. According to some accounts, the Whites ordered all the captured Reds to assemble in a single row on the ice of Lake Huruslahti, selected every tenth prisoner, and executed him on the spot. The selection was not entirely random though, as some prisoners (primarily Red leaders) were specifically selected for execution and other individuals were intentionally spared.

During the Spanish Civil War, 46 men of the Republican 84th Mixed Brigade were executed by firing squad at Mora de Rubielos on 20 January 1938. The reason for the decimation was due to the brigade's poor performance in the harsh winter combat actions in the later stages of the Battle of Teruel and the soldiers of the brigade being branded as disloyal and untrustworthy.

== Usage ==
The term decimation was first used in English to mean a tax of one-tenth (or tithe). Through a process of semantic change starting in the 17th century, the word evolved to refer to any extreme reduction in the number of a population or force, or an overall sense of destruction and ruin, not strictly in the punitive sense or to a reduction by one-tenth. Despite its history, criticism of the broader sense has been noted by some language experts, including Bryan A. Garner, H. W. Fowler, and the Lake Superior State University annual "Banished Words List" in 2008.

== See also ==
- Outline of capital punishment
- Fustuarium
- Lachesis – measured the thread of life with her rod; her Roman equivalent was Decima (the tenth)

== Bibliography ==
=== Modern sources ===
- Broughton, Thomas Robert Shannon (1951). The magistrates of the Roman republic. Vol. 1. New York: American Philological Association.
- Engel, Carlos (1999). Historia de las brigadas mixtas del Ejército Popular de la República (in Spanish). Almena Ediciones. ISBN 978-84-922644-7-6.
- Faszcza, Michal N (2018). "The social perception of the Spartacus revolt and the decimation of Crassus' soldiers in 71 BC". In Słapek, Dariusz (ed.). Spartacus: history and tradition. Lublin: Maria Curie-Skłodowska University Press. ISBN 978-83-227-9145-5.
- Goldberg, Charles (2015). "Decimation in the Roman republic". Classical Journal. 111 (2): 141–164. doi:10.1353/tcj.2015.0014. ISSN 2327-5812.
- Pearson, Elizabeth (2019). "Decimation and unit cohesion: why were Roman legionaries willing to perform decimation?". Journal of Military History. 83 (3): 665–688.
- Statiev, Alexander (2012). "Blocking units in the Red Army". Journal of Military History. 76 (2): 475–95.
- Taylor, Michael J. (2022). "Decimatio: myth, discipline, and death in the Roman republic". Antichthon. 56: 105–120. doi:10.1017/ann.2022.9. ISSN 0066-4774.
- Watson, G R (1969). The Roman soldier. Cornell University Press.
- Wilcox, Vanda (2005). "Discipline in the Italian army, 1915–1918". In Purseigle, Pierre (ed.). Warfare and belligerence. History of warfare, vol. 30. Brill. pp. 73–100. doi:10.1163/9789047407362_007. ISBN 978-90-474-0736-2.

=== Ancient sources ===
- Dio. Roman history – via LacusCurtius.
- Livy (1905) [1st century AD]. From the founding of the city . Translated by Roberts, Canon – via Wikisource.
- Plutarch. "Life of Antony". Parallel lives – via LacusCurtius.
- Polybius (1922–27) [2nd century BC]. Histories. Loeb Classical Library. Translated by Paton, W R – via LacusCurtius.
- Suetonius. "Life of Augustus". The twelve Caesars – via LacusCurtius.
- Suetonius. "Life of Galba". The twelve Caesars – via LacusCurtius.
- Tacitus. Annales – via LacusCurtius.
