= Enrique Fernández Prado =

Spanish businessman (1940–2018)

Enrique Fernández Prado (Langreo, June 30, 1940-Cancún, Quintana Roo; March 24, 2018) was a Spanish businessman based in Mexico. Director and owner of the Atlético Celaya Futbol Club in the First Division of the Mexican football league from 1995 to 2002.

Fernández was the owner of the Atlético Celaya Futbol Club in the 90s. He acquired the franchise when the team was in the Liga Premier – Serie A and obtained the promotion to the maximum circuit after winning 1-0 to Pachuca in the final. Thanks to his love for football and the heavy investment he made, he was able to bring the "Buitre" Butragueño (1995-1998) and "Míchel" Miguel González (1996-1997) to the Mexican football, as well as repatriate Hugo Sánchez (1996-1997) to the country, from the Dallas Burn of the MLS.
