= José Riquelme y López Bago =

Spanish soldier

Lieutenant General José Riquelme y López Bago
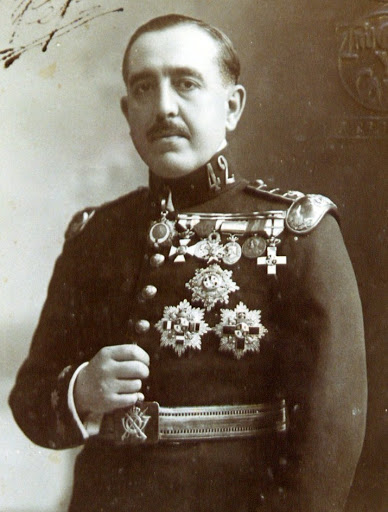
- Born: 31 August 1880; Tarragona, Spain
- Died: 28 January 1972 (aged 91) Paris, France
- Buried: Père Lachaise Cemetery
- Allegiance: Kingdom of Spain; Spanish Republic
- Branch: Spanish Army; Spanish Republican Army
- Service years: ?–1938
- Rank: Lieutenant General
- Conflicts: Rif War: Battle of Annual; Battle of Tétouan; Spanish Civil War: Siege of the Alcázar; Battle of Guadarrama; Battle of Talavera de la Reina

José Riquelme y López-Bago (31 August 1880 – 28 January 1972) was a Spanish soldier noted for his involvement in the Second Moroccan War and the Spanish Civil War. He opposed the dictatorship of General Primo de Rivera. In 1987 he was honoured posthumously by King Juan Carlos who restored to him the rank of Lieutenant general.

== Career ==
Riquelme spent most of his military career in Africa, during the Rif War. In 1921 he was Colonel and Chief of the Indigenous Police. After the Battle of Annual, he was involved in a confrontation with General Sanjurjo over the Expediente Picasso. In 1924 he participated in the Battle of Tétouan.

In 1929 he was a member of the military court that tried José Sánchez Guerra for the artillery revolt at Ciudad Real. The acquittal of the Conservative politician caused Riquelme to be overlooked for further appointments.

The chief minister and Minister of War, Alejandro Lerroux submitted Decree of 15 February 1935 for the signature of the President of the Republic, appointing Riquelme as chief of the Second Organic Division, based in the city of Seville.

He served as commander in chief of the First Military Region from the early days of the General Franco uprising and, at the end of the war, occupied the post of Commander General of the interior zone of the eastern region (Catalonia).

As General of the Infantry Brigade he remained faithful to the Republican government from the early days of the Spanish Civil War. He was appointed head of the Organic Division I, occupying the vacant position that existed after the failed coup of July 18. He commanded the forces that attacked Toledo and later fought in the Battle of Guadarrama. However, in early September his forces suffered heavy defeats in Oropesa and Talavera de la Reina that caused processing. Discharged in 1938, he returned to service as military commander for Barcelona.

== Exile and death ==
From 1939, after the fall of Catalonia, López-Bago was exiled to France until his death in Paris in 1972. His remains are interred in the Père Lachaise Cemetery, Paris.

== Personal life ==
López-Bago married Milagros Ojeda Varona, his first wife, who was President of the Red Cross in Larache and his second wife, Manuela Ruiz Juan, who was president of the Red Cross committee for the Spanish Republic in exile in France. He has a granddaughter in Mexico from his first wife, Maria Rosa Judez Riquelme, and two great-grandchildren, Francisco and Diego Alberto Flores Judez.
