= Enrique Fernández Heredia =

Spanish civil war commander

Enrique Fernández de Heredia Gaztáñaga was a military commander in the Spanish Civil War fighting on the Republican side. He was a commander of artillery in the Spanish Republican Army before the war and was promoted to command the 31st Division. He later commanded the XVIII Corps at Brunete and Teruel.
