= Francisco Antón =

Spanish communist leader

Francisco Antón Sanz
- Francisco Antón in July 1937
- Born: 20 April 1909; Madrid, Spain
- Died: 14 January 1976 (aged 66); Paris, France
- Occupation: Communist leader
- Known for: Lover of Dolores Ibárruri

Francisco Antón Sanz (also Paco Antón Sanz, 20 April 1909, Madrid – 14 January 1976, Paris) was a Spanish communist leader. He is known as the lover of Dolores Ibárruri during and after the Spanish Civil War (1936–1939). After the Republican defeat in 1939 he went into exile in France, Moscow, Mexico, Poland and Czechoslovakia. During an internal power struggle in the early 1950s he was ousted from the leadership of the Spanish Communist Party (PCE), but was later rehabilitated.

== Early years (1909–1936) ==
Francisco Antón Sanz was born on the 20th of April, in 1909, in Madrid. (Note: A document issued when Antón entered Mexico in December 1943 said Francisco Antón Sanz was born in Málaga in 1906.) He found work with the Northern Railway Company (Compañía de Ferrocarriles del Norte). He joined the Spanish Communist Party (Partido Comunista Español, PCE) in 1930 with the help of his brother Gregorio, who was secretary of the party in Madrid. At the outbreak of the Civil War Antón was secretary of the Madrid Provincial Committee of the PCE.

== Spanish Civil War (1936–1939) ==
In the first months of the Spanish Civil War, which began in July 1936, Antón was active in spreading propaganda in the 5th Regiment.

The Popular Front's Comité Provincial de Investigación Pública (CPIP) became the center of a revolutionary terror network targeting Fascist suspects. Under Antón's leadership the Madrid Provincial Federation was associated with the CPIP squads and ran revolutionary tribunals.

He became the lover of the communist leader Dolores Ibárruri. Ibárruri's relationship with Anton, who was thirteen years younger than her, was frowned upon by the puritanical party leadership. José Hernández publicized the affair in an effort to discredit Ibárruri.

From 1937, Antón was a candidate member of the Politburo.

He was appointed inspector-commissar of the Madrid front, which included several army corps.The army was demoralized. There were many deserters, and some of the commissars had themselves fled from the fighting. Antón redefined the role of the brigade commissars in the Army of the Center as being to prevent panics and to reestablish order. He recommended that some of the most trusted soldiers be placed in the rear to shoot soldiers who retreated, and to shoot the officers who had allowed them to retreat. He also told commissars and political delegates that they should remove distinctive badges, which made them favored targets for enemy snipers.

On 21 October 1937, the Minister of Defense Indalecio Prieto issued a decree that political commissars who qualified for the army draft would be limited to the ranks of company, battalion and brigade commissar. The move may have been aimed at young Communist commissars such as Antón. Prieto replaced Antón by the Socialist Fernando Piñuela. The Communist ministers Vicente Uribe and Jesús Hernández Tomás protested at Antón's demotion to brigade commissar on the static Teruel front but Prieto stood his ground and Anton had to leave his post, although he refused to report to the brigade headquarters. Antón became an aide to General Vicente Rojo Lluch.

In October 1938, Antón was assigned responsibility, with Palmiro Togliatti and Gyula Alpári, for conducting an international campaign to discredit the anti-Stalinist Workers' Party of Marxist Unification (POUM) as counter-revolutionary Trotskyites.

In February 1939 Antón was in Toulouse, as were Antonio Mije, Luis Cabo Giorla, Santiago Carrillo and Enrique Líster. Líster flew back to Spain, but the others chose to remain in France.

The Republic fell the next month.

== World War II (1939–1945) ==
Most of the exiled PCE leaders were welcomed by the USSR, making their way by boat from the northeast of France, including Ibárruri, José Díaz, Jesús Hernández Tomás, Juan Modesto, Enrique Lister, Irene Falcón, Antonio Mije, Vicente Uribe and Santiago Carrillo. Antón remained as the party representative in France. When the Molotov–Ribbentrop Pact was signed in August 1939 just before the start of World War II (1939–45), the communists were outlawed in France. Antón was arrested and interned at Camp Vernet in Ariège.

After the German invasion of France, at Ibárruri's request the Russians obtained Antón's release and transfer to Moscow. In Moscow, Antón and others organized the independent Spanish radio station, Radio Pirenáica. Antón was a PCE representative on the Executive Committee of the Communist International in 1940–43 and was dispatched to Mexico in 1943–44. He arrived in Mexico in December 1943, admitted as a political refuge. In 1945 Antón was made a full member of the Politburo.

== Later career (1945–1976) ==
Dolores Ibárruri temporarily withdrew from the PCE leadership due to sickness in the summer of 1947, and Vicente Uribe and Antonio Mije began feuding with Antón and Santiago Carrillo.

On 7 September 1950, the Spanish communists were outlawed in France. Uribe moved to Prague, Czechoslovakia with Mije and Líster, while Carrillo and Antón remained underground in Paris. Antón and Ibárruri broke up. Santiago Carrillo said that Ibárruri had been forced to break off her relationship with Antón in order to become general secretary of the PCE.

In the early 1950s, Antón married a young activist named Carmen Rodríguez. They had two daughters, one with Down syndrome. Antón lived with his wife in Warsaw, where he worked long hours in a factory for poor wages. Carrillo convinced the PCE bureau to pass a resolution in July 1953 that removed Antón from the bureau and the central committee. In April 1954 the bureau sent Líster to Warsaw to tell Antón he had been demoted to the rank and file. The decision was confirmed by the bureau in November 1958. According to Líster his behavior included "crude and brutal anti-Leninist means of leadership, as well as vanity and blind ambition." Antón was also criticized for having been a Jesuit student in the past.

In 1964, Antón was readmitted to the central committee. He moved to Czechoslovakia, where he applauded the reforms of Alexander Dubček and the Prague Spring of 1968. When this was crushed by the Soviet forces he became disillusioned with the USSR and moved towards Eurocommunism.

He died in Paris on 14 January 1976.

== Sources ==
- Alba, Víctor (1983-01-01). The Communist Party in Spain. Transaction Publishers. ISBN 978-1-4128-1999-2.
- "Antón Sanz, Francisco's card file". Ministry of Education, Culture and Sport, Spain.
- Argüelles, José Luis (2010-12-26). "El último amor de Pasionaria". La Nueva España (in Spanish). Editorial Prensa Ibérica.
- Bolloten, Burnett (1991). The Spanish Civil War: Revolution and Counterrevolution. Univ of North Carolina Press. ISBN 978-0-8078-1906-7.
- Byron, Kristine (Autumn 2004). "Writing the Female Revolutionary Self: Dolores Ibárruri and the Spanish Civil War". Journal of Modern Literature. 28 (1, Autobiography and Memoir). Indiana University Press: 138–165. doi:10.1353/jml.2005.0015. JSTOR 3831783. S2CID 153900964.
- Dimitrov, Georgi (2008-10-01). The Diary of Georgi Dimitrov, 1933-1949. Yale University Press. ISBN 978-0-300-13385-1.
- Kirschenbaum, Lisa A. (Fall 2012). "Exile, Gender, and Communist Self-Fashioning: Dolores Ibárruri (La Pasionaria) in the Soviet Union". Slavic Review. 71 (3). Association for Slavic, East European, and Eurasian Studies: 566–589. doi:10.5612/slavicreview.71.3.0566. JSTOR 10.5612/slavicreview.71.3.0566. S2CID 163213049.
- Pike, David Wingeate (June 1980). "Review:The Spanish Revolution: The Left and the Struggle for Power during the Civil War. By Burnett Bolloten". The Journal of Modern History. 52 (2). The University of Chicago Press: 333–335. doi:10.1086/242125. JSTOR 1878260.
- Puigsech Farràs, Josep (2008). "El PSUC, una nueva sección oficial de la Internacional Comunista". Ayer (in Spanish) (72, Espectáculo y sociedad en la España contemporánea). Asociacion de Historia Contemporanea and Marcial Pons Ediciones de Historia. JSTOR 41325996.
- Romero Salvadó, Francisco J. (2013). Historical Dictionary of the Spanish Civil War. Rowman & Littlefield. ISBN 978-0-8108-5784-1.
- Ruiz, Julius (2014-04-30). The 'Red Terror' and the Spanish Civil War. Cambridge University Press. ISBN 978-1-107-05454-7.
- Sagrario Arenas Dorado (2015). "Antón Sanz, Francisco". MCN Biografias.
- Seidman, Michael (2002-11-23). Republic of Egos: A Social History of the Spanish Civil War. Univ of Wisconsin Press. ISBN 978-0-299-17863-5.
- "Vicente Uribe Galdeano". Proyecto filosofía. 29 May 2015.
