= Battle of Talavera de la Reina (1936) =

Coordinates: 39.9583°N 4.8328°W

- Part of the Spanish Civil War
Date	3 September 1936
Location	Talavera de la Reina, Spain
Result	Nationalist victory

Belligerents
(Spain) Second Spanish Republic	(Francoist Spain) Nationalists

Commanders and leaders
General Riquelme; Juan Modesto; Moisés Gamero; José Asensio Torrado	Juan Yagüe; Carlos Asensio Cabanillas; Antonio Castejón Espinosa

Strength
10,000 regulars and militia	3,500 regulars

Casualties and losses
500 dead 1,000 captured	1,000 dead or wounded

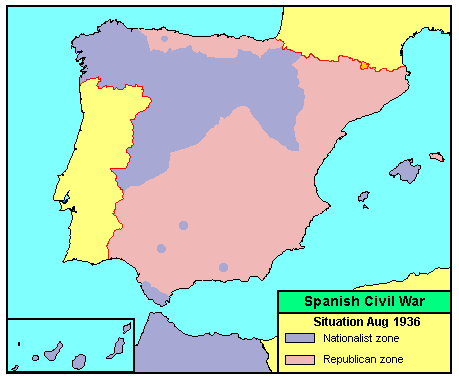

The Battle of Talavera de la Reina was fought on 3 September 1936 in the Spanish Civil War. The Republicans, attempting to bar the road to Madrid at Talavera de la Reina, were defeated by the professional army of the Nationalists, with heavy casualties on both sides.

In the first days of September, after a fitful retreat along the Tagus, the government militias established themselves in a strong position on the heights above Talavera. Rather than risk the Republic's army defending open country in earlier battles, General Riquelme had yielded ground constantly, allowing him to conserve his forces and muster over 10,000 men at Talavera. A strong complement of artillery and an armoured train were placed at his disposal. The weary and shot-torn Nationalists, meanwhile, had advanced several hundred miles with hardly a moment's pause.

At dawn on 3 September General Yagüe raced Colonel Asensio and Major Castejón up the flanks of the defenders. The two columns soon seized the city's train station and aerodrome. Once again the Republican militias lost their nerve, knowing their fate should they be surrounded and captured. Many soldiers deserted their posts and fled the battlefield in buses.

At midday Yagüe assaulted the city proper. Although the Republicans clung on for most of the afternoon, little resistance was offered in the streets and by evening Talavera had been lost. The assault cost the Nationalists 1,000 dead or wounded. The Republicans lost 500 dead, 1,000 captured, and 42 guns. More alarmingly, they lost their last line of defence before Madrid, which would soon be put under siege.

The defeat had as consequence the fall of the government of José Giral and a new designation to the new Government of Francisco Largo Caballero.

== See also ==
- List of Spanish Nationalist military equipment of the Spanish Civil War
- List of Spanish Republican military equipment of the Spanish Civil War
- Quinto Regimiento

== Bibliography ==
- Carr, Raymond (1974). Estudios sobre la República y la Guerra Civil Española. Barcelona: Ariel. p. 336. ISBN 9788434424586.
- Preston, Paul (2011). El Holocausto Español. Odio y Exterminio en la Guerra Civil y después. Barcelona: Penguin Random House Grupo Editorial España. ISBN 9788499920498.
- Thomas, Hugh (1961). The Spanish Civil War. New York: Harper & Brothers. p. 1096. ISBN 9780375755156.
