= Celadas =

- Municipality
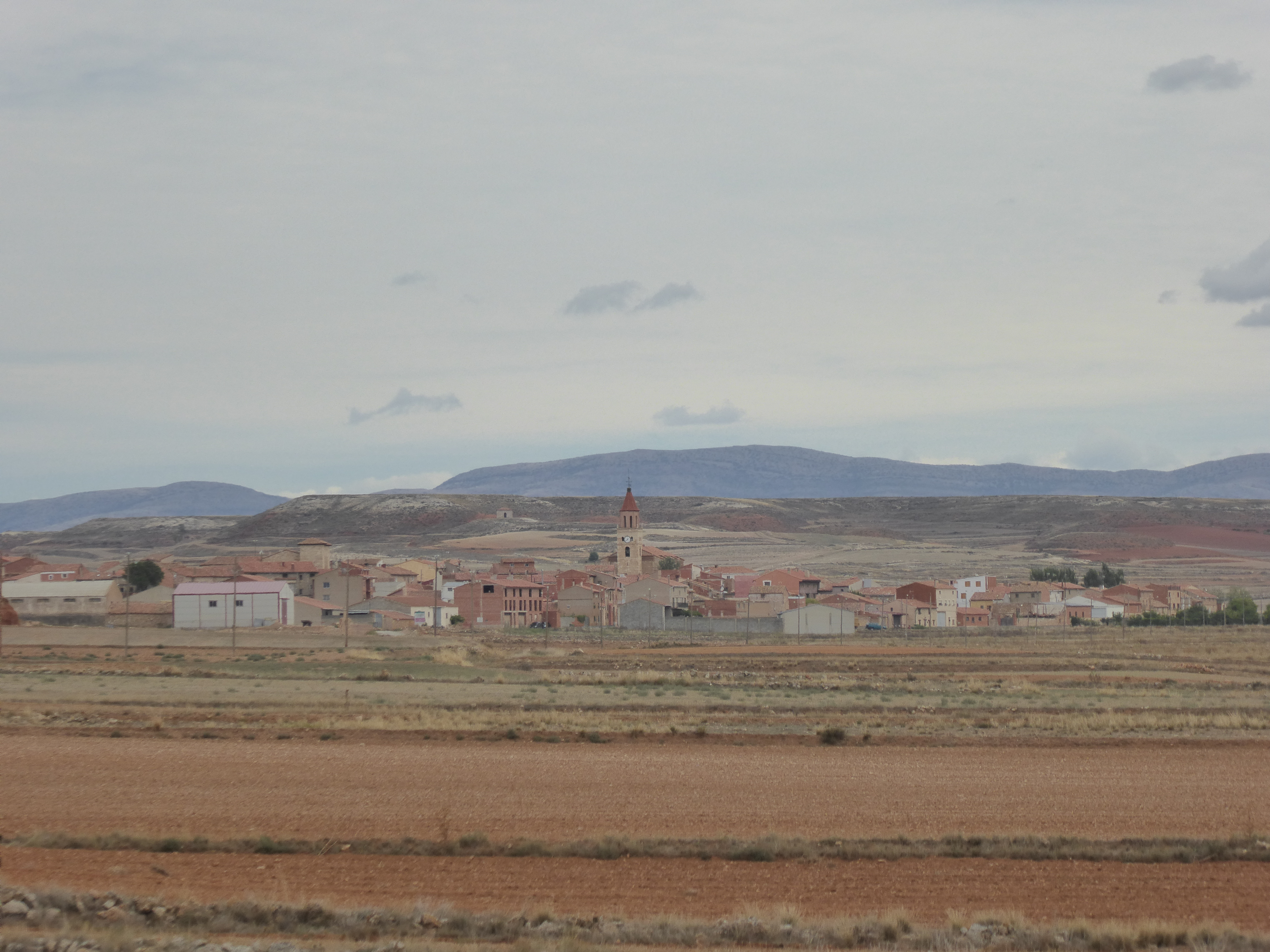

- Location within Spain
- Coordinates: 40°28′N 1°9′W
- Country: Spain
- Autonomous community: Aragon
- Province: Teruel
- Municipality: Celadas

Area
  - Total: 100 km^{2} (39 sq mi)

Population (2025-01-01)
  - Total: 331
  - Density: 3.3/km^{2} (8.6/sq mi)
- Time zone: UTC+1 (CET)
  - Summer (DST): UTC+2 (CEST)

Celadas is a municipality located in the province of Teruel, Aragon, Spain. According to the 2018 census (INE), the municipality has a population of 396 inhabitants.

== See also ==
- List of municipalities in Teruel
