= José Asensio Torrado =

Spanish general (1892–1961)

- Born: José Asensio Torrado; 1892
- Died: 1961 (aged 68–69)
- Military career
- Allegiance: Kingdom of Spain (1904–1932); Spanish Republic (1931–1936)
- Service years: 1936–1939
- Rank: General
- Commands: Under-secretary of war 1936–1937
- Conflicts: Spanish Civil War: Battle of Talavera de la Reina

José Asensio Torrado (1892–1961) was a Spanish general.

== Life ==
Before the Spanish Civil War, he was a major in the Republican Army and a member of the Republican Antifascist Military Union. He was one of the few Africanistas officers who remained loyal to the Republican government, and he led a militia column on the Somosierra front. He led the Republican troops on the Tagus front and reorganised the Republican troops but was unable to stop the Nationalist offensive.

On 24 October, he was appointed subsecretary of war by Prime Minister Francisco Largo Caballero and in November 1936 was appointed commander of the Central Army. He reorganised the Republican Army and aided in the forming of the mixed brigades, which merged the militia troops with the remains of the prewar army, the first troops of the republican army capable of open-field fighting.

Nevertheless, he was rejected by the communists and the anarchists because he wanted to impose discipline on the Republican Army, and Soviet Ambassador Marcel Rosenberg, wanted him to be dismissed. On 21 February 1937, he was dismissed after the fall of Málaga.
