= Domingo Rey d'Harcourt =

Spanish military officer, colonel

- Born: 1883; Pamplona, Spain
- Died: February 7, 1939 (aged 55–56); Ponts de Molins, Catalonia
- Military career
- Allegiance: Kingdom of Spain (1900–1931); Spanish Republic (1931–1936); Nationalist Spain (1936–1939)
- Branch: Spanish Army
- Service years: 1901–1939
- Rank: Colonel of artillery
- Commands: Teruel Garrison
- Conflicts: Spanish Civil War

Domingo Rey d'Harcourt (1883 – February 7, 1939) was a Nationalist commander during the Spanish Civil War.

He had risen to Colonel of artillery, and joined the military rising against the Republican Government that became the Spanish Civil War.

During the Civil War Rey d'Harcourt was the commander of the Nationalist garrison of the city of Teruel during the Battle of Teruel. Heavily outnumbered, Rey d'Harcourt made a last stand in four key points of the city; the Civil Governor's Building, the Bank of Spain, the Convent of Santa Clara and the Seminary. Republican Radio Barcelona announced that Teruel had fallen, but Rey d'Harcourt and the remnants of the 4,000 man garrison still held out. With no water, few medical supplies and little food he was finally forced to surrender on January 8, 1938.

He was jailed for treason against the Republic first in Valencia and then in Barcelona. During the Nationalist Catalonia Offensive he was taken towards the French border and was murdered by his guards along with forty-two other prisoners of the Battle of Teruel, including Anselmo Polanco, Bishop of Teruel.
