= 2019 European heatwaves =

Meteorological history
- Duration: 24 June 2019 - 28 July 2019
- Heat wave
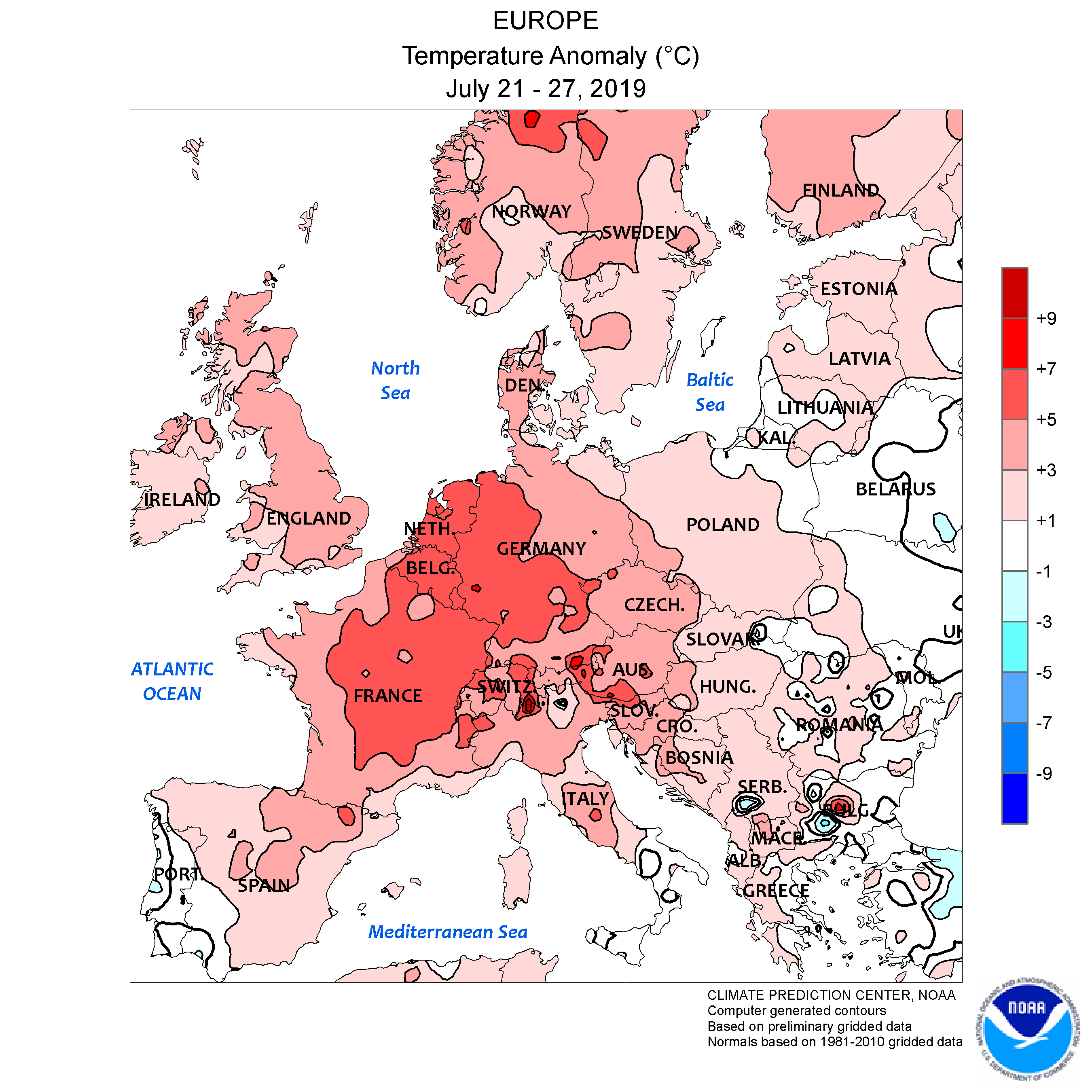
- Temperature anomalies during the week from 21 to 27 July with values of +5 to +9 in the red area.

Overall effects
- Fatalities: 3,951+ deaths: Belgium: 716; France: 1,435; Germany: 500; Netherlands: 400; United Kingdom: 900
- Areas affected: Europe

In late June and late July 2019 there were two temporally distinct European heat waves, which set all-time high temperature records in Belgium, France, Germany, Luxembourg, the Netherlands, and the United Kingdom.

The first heat wave, in late June, killed over 567 people, and according to meteorologists it was caused by high pressure and winds from the Sahara Desert affecting large parts of the continent. It resulted in record-breaking temperatures for the month of June at many locations. France experienced temperatures in excess of 45 °C (113 °F) for the first time in recorded history. A national all-time record high temperature of 46.0 °C (114.8 °F) occurred on 28 June in Vérargues.

In late July, a second heat wave occurred, during which all-time records were broken by 3 °C (5.4 °F) in Belgium, by 2.1 °C (3.8 °F) in Germany and the Netherlands, by 0.3 °C (0.5 °F) in Luxembourg, and by 0.2 °C (0.4 °F) in the United Kingdom. The deaths of 868 people in France and one person in Belgium were reported, along with thousands of animals when ventilation systems in barns were overwhelmed. Due to high river water temperatures and sluggish flows, particularly in France and to some extent Germany, a number of thermal power stations that use once-through cooling and do not have cooling towers had to reduce output or shut down to avoid breaching environmental limits on river water temperature designed to protect aquatic life.

== Meteorological history ==
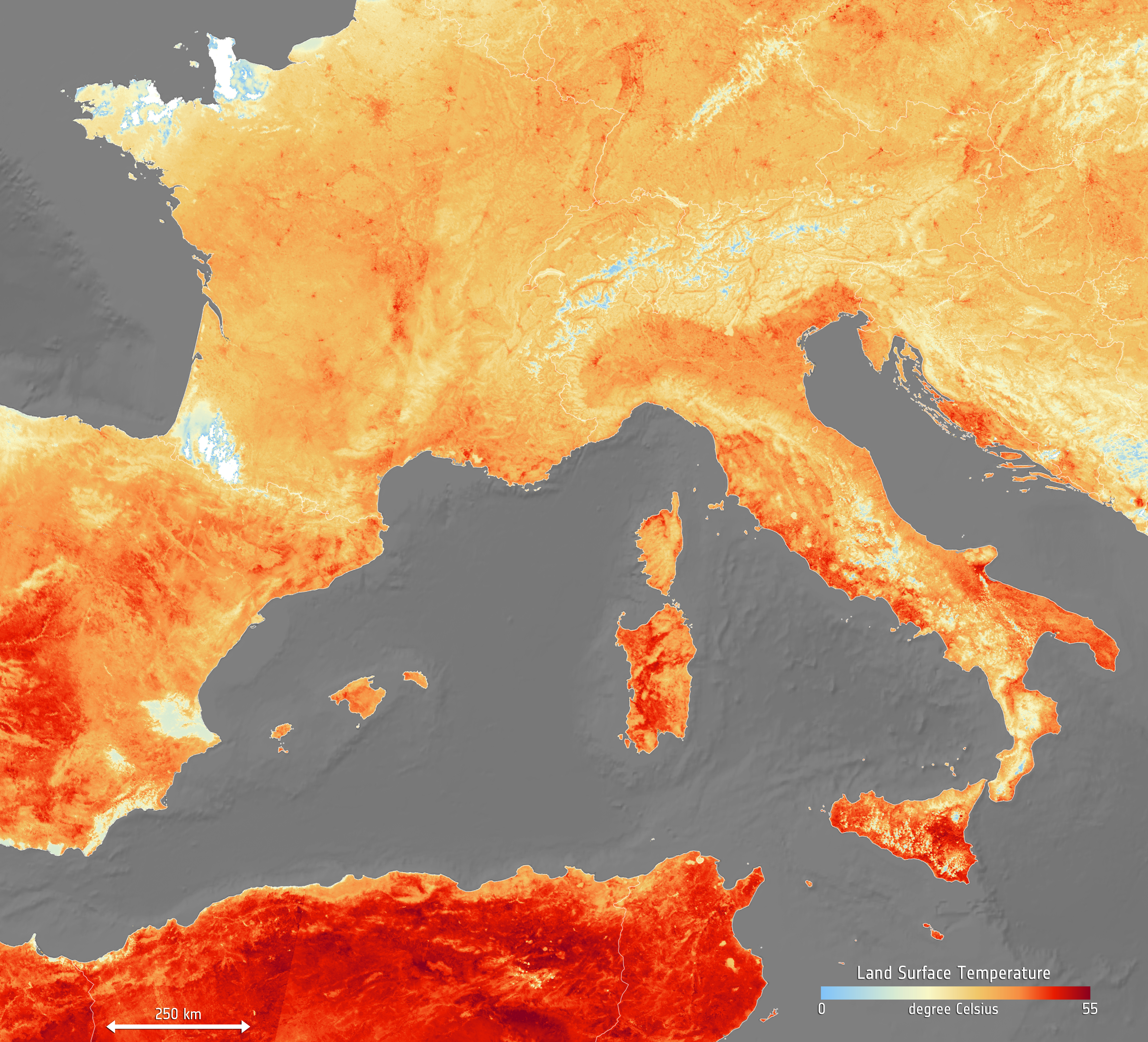
Temperatures on 26 June.

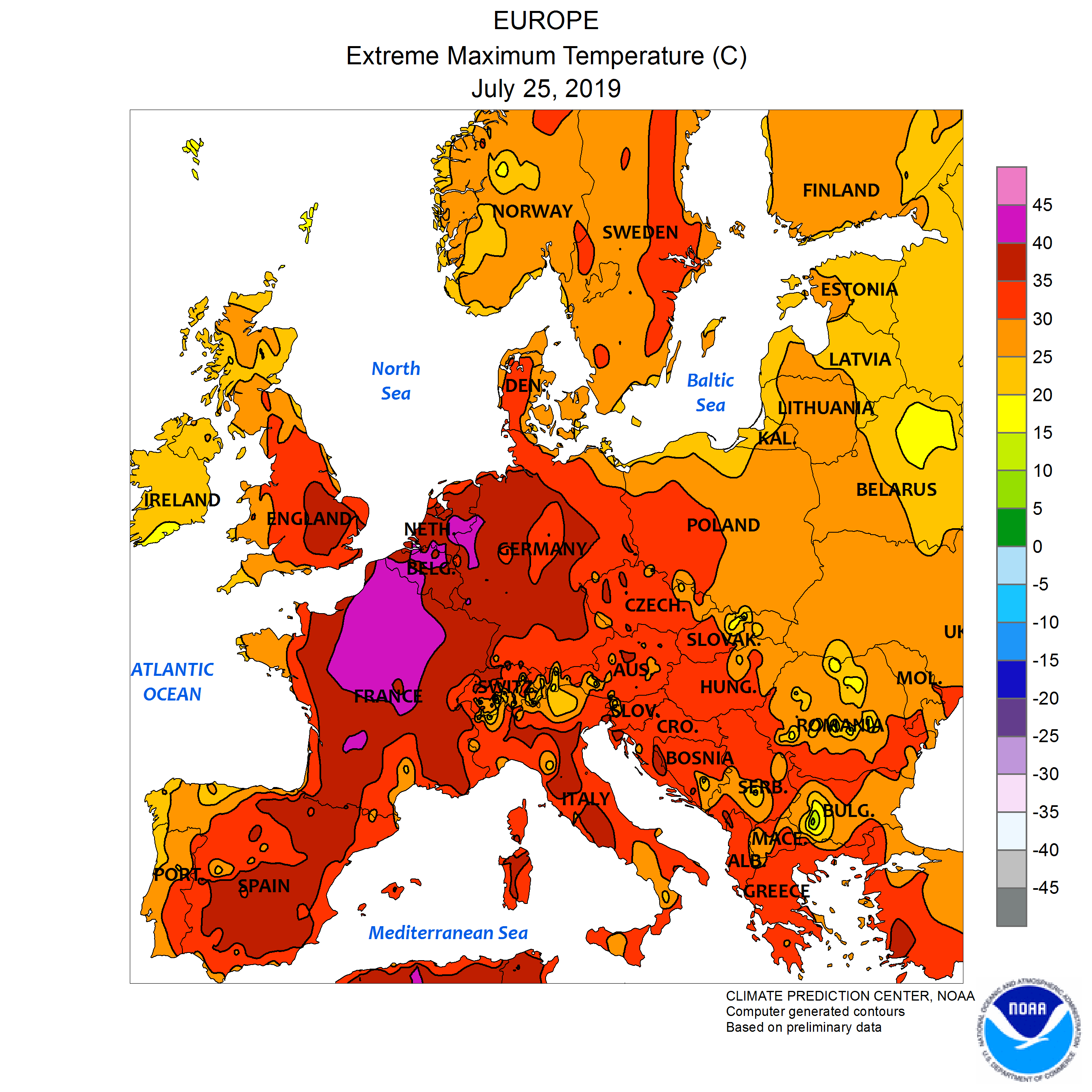
Maximum temperatures on 25 July.

The above-normal hot condition in June is caused by an anomalous long-lasting anticyclone in the upper troposphere, which advects warm air from the Sahel and Mediterranean region and enhances incoming solar radiation and surface turbulent fluxes. The anomalous anticyclone results from an unusually-intensified British-Baikal Corridor pattern and a synoptic Rossby wave breaking event over Europe.

The July heat wave was caused by a strong omega block, consisting of hot, dry air from North Africa, trapped between cold storm systems. The high-pressure area of hot air, called Yvonne, stretched from the central Mediterranean to Scandinavia and was pinned between two low-pressure areas, one over western Russia and the other over the eastern Atlantic.

== Fatalities ==
Total excess deaths are estimated to be around 2,500 during the summer months in 2019. Most of these were indirectly caused and were observed in statistical modeling later that year. Based on individual country counts, that figure may be an under estimate. The Dutch government reported 400 excess deaths in the week of the June heat wave, a figure comparable to those recorded during the 2006 European heat wave.

France estimated 1,435 additional deaths due to the heatwave. Public Health England reported 900 excess deaths from the heatwave. The Robert Koch institute reported 500 excess deaths in Berlin alone. Belgium reported at least 716 excess deaths during the summer.

== By country ==
=== Austria ===
In June heat records were broken, on 30 June the temperature reached 38.5 °C (101.3 °F) in Innsbruck. This was a heat record for June in Austria, and also the highest temperature measured during the heatwaves.

=== Belgium ===
Belgium recorded three consecutive days exceeding 30 °C (86 °F); 25 June was the hottest day during this period, with many places exceeding 32 °C (90 °F) and other places nearly reaching 35 °C (95 °F).

During the period of hot weather, environmental officials warned of poor air quality levels, which would especially affect the young, elderly and people with respiratory illnesses. It also affects small countries that rely on tourism as their main source of income.

On 24 July, the highest ever recorded temperature in Belgium was measured, reaching 40.2 °C (104.4 °F) in the town of Angleur, exceeding the previous record of 38.8 °C (101.8 °F), reached in 1947. On the same day, passengers were evacuated from a Eurostar train that had broken down between Halle and Tubize, as many began to fall ill due to the extreme temperatures. On 25 July, the national record was broken again, reaching 41.8 °C (107.2 °F) in Begijnendijk (Flemish Brabant). One death was reported.

The official KMI weather station in Uccle reported a maximum temperature of 39.7 °C (103.5 °F), while many other weather stations, some even close to the North Sea, reported temperatures in excess of 40.0 °C (104.0 °F).

=== Czech Republic ===
The temperature record for June was recorded in Doksany and was 38.9 °C (102.0 °F). High temperatures also complicated rail transport in the Czech Republic.

=== Denmark ===
On 22 July 2019 the DMI issued a warning for high temperatures possibly up to 35 °C (95 °F). On 24 July, the temperature reached 30.9 °C (87.6 °F) in Åbenrå, Svendborg and Nykøbing Falster. On 25 July the temperature reached 32.0 °C (89.6 °F) in Vordingborg & Holbæk. Temperatures for that day were forecasted up to 35 °C (95 °F), but due to afternoon thunderstorms the temperature only reached a maximum of 32.0 °C (89.6 °F).

=== Finland ===
On 28 July, Helsinki recorded a temperature of 33.2 °C (91.8 °F), breaking the city's previous record. On the same day, 33.7 °C (92.7 °F) was recorded in Porvoo.

=== France ===
Map of France Legend No particular vigilance Warning Vigilance required Absolute vigilance

Weather warnings in place for 24–25 July in France No particular vigilance Warning Vigilance required Absolute vigilance

France was one of the most affected countries from the heatwave, with much of the country exceeding 32 °C (90 °F) on 26 June. Météo France issued an Orange Alert for much of the country due to exceptionally hot temperatures, excluding coastal regions, e.g. Brittany and the northern part of Hauts-de-France. Four departments of France were put on Red Alert: Bouches-du-Rhône, Gard, Hérault and Vaucluse. Owing to building codes with old structures common across the country, numerous buildings in France lack air conditioning.

The French Government acted more proactively for the heat wave in light of its failings during the 2003 European heat wave. 15,000 people died during that event in France. Approximately 4,000 schools closed nationwide. Authorities in Paris opened public cooling rooms. Parks and pools extended operation hours in multiple cities. Museums with air conditioning allowed free entry for all people.

France observed temperatures in excess of 45 °C (113 °F) for the first time in recorded history. A national all-time record of 46.0 °C (114.8 °F) was recorded by a staffed weather station in Vérargues on 28 June, verified by Météo France on 19 July. Earlier, the highest temperature considered to have been reliably recorded during the heat wave was 45.9 °C (114.6 °F) by an automatic weather station in Gallargues-le-Montueux, also on 28 June. These exceeded the previous record of 44.1 °C (111.4 °F), recorded in Conqueyrac and Saint-Christol-lès-Alès.

Twelve other locations observed temperatures above the previous record high. Villevieille experienced temperatures of 45.1 °C (113.2 °F) on this day. Numerous records were broken along the Mediterranean coastline. Montpellier observed a temperature of 43.5 °C (110.3 °F), shattering the previous all-time by 5.8 °C (10.4 °F). Nantes and Bourges saw their highest low-temperature ever during the overnight of 27–28 June at 24.7 °C (76.5 °F) and 23.8 °C (74.8 °F), respectively.

Five people died nationwide: four from drowning and one from heat stroke. Police noted an increase in instances of illegal fire hydrant openings. A six-year-old child was hospitalised in critical condition after being hit by a stream of water from an illegally opened hydrant. Hospitals reported a significant increase in cases of cramps, dehydration, dizziness, and heart conditions.

In July 2019, France experienced its second heat wave in less than a month, beating several regional and national temperature records. In the previous month, a national record temperature of 46.1 °C (115.0 °F) was measured in the southern commune of Gallargues-le-Montueux. More than 50 French cities exceeded their previous high temperature records in this heat wave.

On 23 July 80 departments of France were included in an orange heat wave alert by Météo-France, and 20 departments were included in a red alert the next day. On 24 July, a temperature of 41.2 °C (106.2 °F) was registered by Météo-France in Bordeaux, breaking the city's previous record of 40.7 °C (105.3 °F) in 2003. Similarly, on 25 July, a temperature of 42.6 °C (108.7 °F) was recorded in Paris, also breaking the city's previous record of 40.4 °C (104.7 °F) in July 1947.

On the night of 24–25 July, France saw its hottest night since records began, as the whole country averaged an overnight low of 21.4 °C (70.5 °F), exceeding the record from the 2003 heat wave. Bordeaux saw an overnight low of 26.8 °C (80.2 °F), beating the previous record of 25 °C (77 °F, 2006); Lille saw 23.2 °C (73.8 °F), exceeding the July 2007 record of 22.5 °C (72.5 °F). Lille also saw a high of 41.5 °C (106.7 °F) the following day, above the record of 37.6 °C (99.7 °F) that had been set the previous year.

On 25 July, the chief architect of the Notre-Dame de Paris cathedral told media that he feared that the heat wave could cause the cathedral's vaulted ceilings, damaged in an April 2019 fire, to collapse. While he indicated the stone walls were still stable for the time being, he explained that the walls were still saturated with water sprayed by firefighters during the blaze, and rapid drying from the extreme temperatures could adversely affect the stability of the structure.

Two nuclear reactors in southwest France were shut down and the output of six reactors were curtailed to avoid breaching environmental limits on the temperature of the rivers they use for cooling water. This reduced French nuclear power generation by around 5.2 gigawatts at a time of increased electricity demand due to the use of cooling devices.

According to the French Ministry of Health, 567 were reported to have died during the June heat wave, and 868 people died as a result of the July heat wave.

=== Germany ===
Most of Germany recorded temperatures exceeding 32 °C (90 °F) on 26 June as well as large parts of the country exceeding 35 °C (95 °F). Temperatures as high as 37.5 °C (99.5 °F) were recorded in Berlin-Tempelhof, and Brandenburg had temperatures reaching 38.6 °C (101.5 °F), exceeding the previous June record of 38.2 °C (100.8 °F) recorded in Frankfurt. Nationwide, the average temperature for all of June reached 19.8 °C (67.6 °F), marking the warmest June in 140 years of record-keeping.

Four people died from drowning nationwide.

On 25 July, a temperature of 42.6 °C (108.7 °F) was recorded in Lingen, Lower Saxony. This beat the record for the highest ever temperature recorded in Germany, following its previous record of 40.5 °C (104.9 °F) measured a day earlier. Twenty-five weather stations in the country reported temperatures of 40 °C (104 °F) or higher on 25 July. Prior to this heat wave, the highest recorded temperature in Germany was 40.3 °C (104.5 °F) in Kitzingen in 2015.

At the end of the heat wave, on the evening of 26 July, a maximum purple alert for storms was issued for three districts (Landkreise) of the Land Baden-Württemberg, namely Freudenstadt, Böblingen and Calw.

=== Greenland ===
After the heat wave ended in mainland Europe, the mass of warm air traveled north to Greenland, causing a heat wave that led to a melting of some 197 gigatonnes (217 billion short tons) of ice in July. The melting was forecast to peak on 1 August. For comparison, the entire melt season in 2012 caused 290 gigatonnes (320 billion short tons) of ice loss. A record 56.5 percent of Greenland Ice Sheet was showing signs of melting on 31 July. US National Snow and Ice Data Center estimated ice loss during the first week of August at 11–22 gigatonnes (12–24 billion short tons) per day with a total loss of 230 gigatonnes (250 billion short tons) for the melt season to date.

A wild fire which has been burning near Sisimiut since early July necessitated dispatching firefighters from Denmark, as the fire was endangering inhabited areas and had the potential to continue burning through the winter. Forest fires are exceedingly rare in Greenland.

=== Italy ===
By 28 June, Italian authorities placed 16 cities under high alert for dangerous temperatures. Civil security services distributed water to tourists visiting Rome.

A 72-year-old man died of heat stroke in the Milano Centrale railway station.

=== Luxembourg ===
On 25 July, a red alert for extreme heat was put in place for the entire country by Meteolux. The same day, a temperature of 40.8 °C (105.4 °F) was measured in Steinsel, the highest ever recorded in the country, beating the record of 40.5 °C (104.9 °F) set in Remich in 2003.

The high heat and dry conditions caused several fires during the heat wave. On 24 July, a fire broke out near Schumannseck, and hay bales caught fire in a field. On 25 July, a bush fire occurred in Hamm, and a fire truck exploded when it became engulfed in flames whilst attending the scene.

=== Netherlands ===
On 25 June, much of the inland areas of the Netherlands exceeded 32 °C (90 °F). The KNMI issued a code yellow warning for large parts of the country due to the heat, and RIVM also put National Heat Plans into force in areas issued under code yellow.

De Bilt, where the headquarters of the KNMI is located, recorded a temperature of 33.2 °C (91.8 °F), and parts of Uden and Gelderland recorded temperatures as high as 36 °C (97 °F).

In July in the Netherlands, an orange alert was put in place for the entire country due to the extreme heat. The previous high temperature heat record 38.6 °C (101.5 °F), set in Warnsveld in 1944, was broken on 24 July in Eindhoven (North Brabant) where the temperature reached 39.3 °C (102.7 °F). The following day, 40.7 °C (105.3 °F) was measured in Gilze-Rijen (also North Brabant). The West Frisian Islands was the only region for which no weather alert had been issued but there was a heatwave for the first time ever on Vlieland and Terschelling since measurements started in 1996.

On 27 July, the KNMI ended the orange alert for South Holland, Zeeland, North Brabant and Limburg. The same day at 22:32 CEST they ended the orange alert for the whole country.

On 22 July, ProRail announced code red for traffic controllers, as extra alertness was necessary for disturbances on the tracks and other problems due to heat. On 25 July, NS cancelled services on the Schiphol–Antwerp high-speed railway between Amsterdam—Schiphol— Rotterdam, and the connection between Amsterdam—Eindhoven and Eindhoven—Heerlen. As trains were exposed to high temperatures, more maintenance was required and some were taken out of service. Units without air conditioning or openable windows were also taken out of service. This continued into the following day, except with four other routes made unavailable; Amsterdam—Alkmaar, Amsterdam—The Hague, Duivendrecht—Lelystad and Schiphol—Nijmegen.

Many farm animals died as a result of the high temperatures, mainly due to ventilation systems failing. Due to a power failure in a chicken barn in Neer, 4,000 chickens died. Hundreds of chickens also died whilst being transported to Poland on 24 July because of rising temperatures. On the same day, hundreds of pigs died in Middelharnis because of power failure in ventilation systems, and 2,100 pigs died in Maarheeze as barns reached temperatures of 40 °C (104 °F).

Nearly 400 extra people were reported to have died during the heatwave compared to a regular summer week.

=== Norway ===
On 26 July, a temperature of 33.4 °C (92.1 °F) was recorded in Bergen Municipality in Norway, setting a new temperature record for the city. A day later, at Laksfors railway station south of Mosjøen, a temperature of 35.6 °C (96.1 °F) was recorded, equalling the national all-time temperature record first set in June 1970. However, the Norwegian Meteorological Institute later did not approve the recording due to too much gravel and too high vegetation near the station.

The highest recording approved was 35 °C (95 °F) at the Mosjøen Airport on 27 July, the warmest temperature ever recorded in Northern Norway and a tie with the all-time national high for July. The same day, a temperature of 34.6 °C (94.3 °F) was recorded further north in Saltdal Municipality. This is highest temperature ever recorded inside the Arctic Circle in Norway. On 27 July, Trondheim Airport recorded a new all-time high with 33.5 °C (92.3 °F) and saw five consecutive days with high above 32 °C (90 °F).

At Sømna-Kvaløyfjellet, a weather station on a coastal hill 302 m (991 ft) ASL in Nordland in Northern Norway (65°13′16″N 11°59′34″E), the overnight low on 28 July did not go below 26.1 °C (79.0 °F), beating the previous national record for the warmest night of 25.5 °C (77.9 °F) recorded 6 degrees of latitude further south in Halden Municipality, south of Oslo, in July 1933. The Norwegian Meteorological Institute said that it had recorded "tropical nights" in 20 locations in the south of the country, where temperatures stayed above 20 °C (68 °F) throughout the night.

=== Poland ===
Poland recorded high temperatures early in June, with much of the country exceeding 30 °C (86 °F) on 12 June. Like much of Western and Central Europe, most of Poland recorded temperatures as high as 33 °C (91 °F) on 26 June. Poland has also exceeded its previous June record, recording 38.2 °C (100.8 °F) in Radzyń.

=== Spain ===
Large parts of Spain recorded temperatures exceeding recorded 35 °C (95 °F) on 27 June, and recorded its hottest temperatures in the north east of the country, with temperatures reaching as high as 39.6 °C (103.3 °F) in Bilbao and exceeding 40 °C (104 °F) in Zaragoza on 27 June. Albuquerque, Badajoz recorded 44.4 °C (111.9 °F) on 29 June.

Zaragoza Airport registered 43.2 °C (109.8 °F) in June 2019, Zaragoza was forecasted to reach temperatures as high as 44 °C (111 °F), exceeding the June temperature record for the city.

At least two heat stroke deaths occurred in the country: a 93-year-old man in Valladolid and a 17-year-old boy in Córdoba.

A wildfire broke out in La Torre de l'Espanyol within the Province of Tarragona in Catalonia on 26 June. According to local authorities, the fire ignited from decomposing chicken feces exposed to prolonged sunlight. Strong winds caused the fire to expand, with the blaze covering 6,500 hectares (16,000 acres) by 28 June. It was said to be the worst wildfire in Catalonia in 20 years.

By 28 June more than 600 firefighters and six aircraft were deployed to combat the blaze. Dozens of people were displaced, including at least 30 in Flix. Near the village, more than 200 sheep, 2 horses, and a donkey died in the fire. One of Ascó's Nuclear Power Plant evacuation power lines was near the site the fire started, so it was subsequently switched off in an attempt to aid with the fire extinguishing tasks. The plant continued to operate normally throughout the days.

=== Sweden ===
Sweden was only affected in the southern portion of the country. On 30 June Oskarshamn measured 33.7 °C (92.7 °F) the highest June temperature since 1970.

On 26 July, a temperature of 34.8 °C (94.6 °F) was recorded in Markusvinsa, the highest temperature recorded in the north of Sweden since 1945. The Swedish Meteorological and Hydrological Institute issued a Class 1 heat warning for parts of the country, as well as a warning for potential water shortages in August in 15 counties. To prevent forest fires due to the heat and dry weather, fire bans were put in place in several locations in Sweden. A meteorologist at the institute stated that although above average, temperatures in the south of the country were not as extreme. Mainly, the reason for this was that July started with a cool spell in Northern Europe in between the two heat waves.

=== Switzerland ===
In Switzerland, heat records were broken for the month of June at nearly 30 locations across the country. Temperatures reached as high as 35.5 °C (95.9 °F) in Zürich and 35.3 °C (95.5 °F) in Basel on 26 June.

Areas with high altitudes also exceeded 30 °C (86 °F), with temperatures reaching as high as 30.3 °C (86.5 °F) in Col Des Mosses and Adelboden.

MeteoSwiss issued a Level 3 hazard due to high temperatures for much of the country, with large parts of Valais and Ticino under a Level 4 hazard, meaning high danger due to the exceptional heat.

The highest temperature measured during the heatwaves was 37.4 °C (99.3 °F) on 25 July in Basel.

=== United Kingdom ===
On 29 June large parts of England, including the South and the Midlands, faced temperatures exceeding 30 °C (86 °F) with the highest temperature of 34.0 °C (93.2 °F) recorded at Heathrow Airport and RAF Northolt. The heatwave was rather short lived in the United Kingdom, with temperatures dropping to near normal the next day.

One child drowned in the River Irwell in Greater Manchester after diving in to cool off during high temperatures.

On 23 July, Public Health England renewed a heat warning for the whole of the United Kingdom, urging people to "keep hydrated, find shade and take protection against the sun". On the same night, widespread thunderstorms affected the country, with BBC Weather reporting around 48,000 lightning strikes overnight.

On 25 July, the Met Office announced that the United Kingdom had its hottest July day on record, with a temperature of 38.6 °C (101.5 °F) recorded in Rainham Kent. This beat the previous July record of 36.7 °C (98.1 °F) in 2015, and marked the second time in history that the UK had recorded a temperature higher than 38.5 °C (101.3 °F). On 29 July, sensors at the Cambridge University Botanic Garden recorded a temperature of 38.7 °C (101.7 °F) on 25 July, breaking the national all-time record of 38.5 °C (101.3 °F) set in Brogdale, Kent, on 10 August 2003. Brogdale broke the highest temperature recorded in SE England for July with 38.4 °C (101.1 °F), 0.1 °C off its previous record in 2003.

New local temperature records were set in towns and cities across the country on 25 July, including 31.6 °C (88.9 °F) in Edinburgh and 35.1 °C (95.2 °F) in Sheffield.

==== Impact on British transport and flights ====
On 25 July, Network Rail began to impose speed restrictions across its network to reduce buckling rails, as track temperatures surpassed 50 °C (122 °F). Measures included painting railway tracks white to reduce the temperature of the steel, and cancelling services. East Midlands Trains, Southeastern and Greater Anglia advised passengers against all but essential travel.

Many heat-related incidents on the country's rail network caused widespread disruptions, especially affecting intercity services from London. Damage to overhead line equipment occurred in Peterborough, Handsworth and Camden, as well as a trackside grass fire caused by cables snapping near West Hampstead. Trains arriving and departing from Birmingham New Street and around the West Midlands were also disrupted. Passengers were advised not to start new journeys as the overheating of overhead cables rendered many services unable to run.

On 26 July, all but essential travel had been advised against, after the extreme heat and storms caused severe disruption to the rail network and airports. Thameslink ran reduced services, with half of its lines unavailable. East Midlands Trains services between Sheffield, Nottingham, Derby and London St Pancras were disrupted due to overhead wire damage from the heat of the previous day, and an emergency timetable was put in place. All Eurostar services to and from Paris were suspended for an "undetermined amount of time" due to an exploded cable, as well as delays lasting up to an hour on Brussels services.

Several flights were cancelled and delayed from Heathrow, Gatwick and London City airports due to "extreme weather conditions across Europe". A spokesperson from Heathrow said that flights had been affected by overnight storms as a result of the heat.

== Highest temperature per country ==
Country	Temperature	Date	Location
Andorra	39.4 °C (102.9 °F)	28 June	Borda Vidal
Austria	38.5 °C (101.3 °F)	30 June	Innsbruck
Belgium	41.8 °C (107.2 °F)	25 July	Begijnendijk
Czechia	38.9 °C (102.0 °F)	25 July	Doksany
Denmark	32.0 °C (89.6 °F)	25 July	Holbæk & Vordingborg
Finland	33.7 °C (92.7 °F)	28 July	Porvoo
France	46.0 °C (114.8 °F)	28 June	Vérargues
Germany	42.6 °C (108.7 °F)	25 July	Lingen
Ireland	29.8 °C (85.6 °F)	27 June	Ardfert, County Kerry
Liechtenstein	37.2 °C (99.0 °F)	30 June	Eschen
Lithuania	35.7 °C (96.3 °F)	12 June	Kaišiadorys
Luxembourg	40.8 °C (105.4 °F)	25 July	Steinsel
Netherlands	40.7 °C (105.3 °F)	25 July	Gilze-Rijen
Norway	35.0 °C (95.0 °F)	27 July	Mosjøen Airport
Poland	38.2 °C (100.8 °F)	26 June	Radzyń
Portugal	43.1 °C (109.6 °F)	11 July	Alvega, Santarem
Spain	44.4 °C (111.9 °F)	29 June	Badajoz
Sweden	34.8 °C (94.6 °F)	26 July	Markusvinsa
Switzerland	37.4 °C (99.3 °F)	25 July	Basel
United Kingdom	38.7 °C (101.7 °F)	25 July	Cambridge University Botanic Garden

== Research ==
As of 1 August, the World Meteorological Organisation considered July 2019 to be at least tied for the hottest month ever recorded, based on global average temperature. Previously, June 2019 was found to be the hottest June on record. This was confirmed on 5 August by EU Earth Observation Network, which found it 0.04 °C (0.072 °F) hotter than the previous record-holder, July 2016. 2019 on the whole was found to be on track for the new hottest year on record.

A study of the event, a collaboration between several European climatological organisations and institutes, was published on 2 August 2019. It found that the temperatures experienced during the heat wave would have been 1.5 to 3 °C (2.7 to 5.4 °F) lower had it not been for anthropogenic global warming, and that temperatures recorded in France and Netherlands would have occurred there on average less than once a millennium. According to the study's lead author, at the current pace of warming, such heatwaves will be another 3 °C (5.4 °F) stronger by 2050.

== See also ==
- 2003 European heatwave
- 2006 European heatwave
- 2018 European heatwave
- 2022 European heatwaves
- 2023 European heatwaves
- 2024 European heatwaves
- 2025 European heatwaves
- 2026 European heatwaves
- 2019 Siberia wildfires
- List of weather records
- List of heat waves in 2019
- Climate change in Europe
