= Ascó =

- Municipality
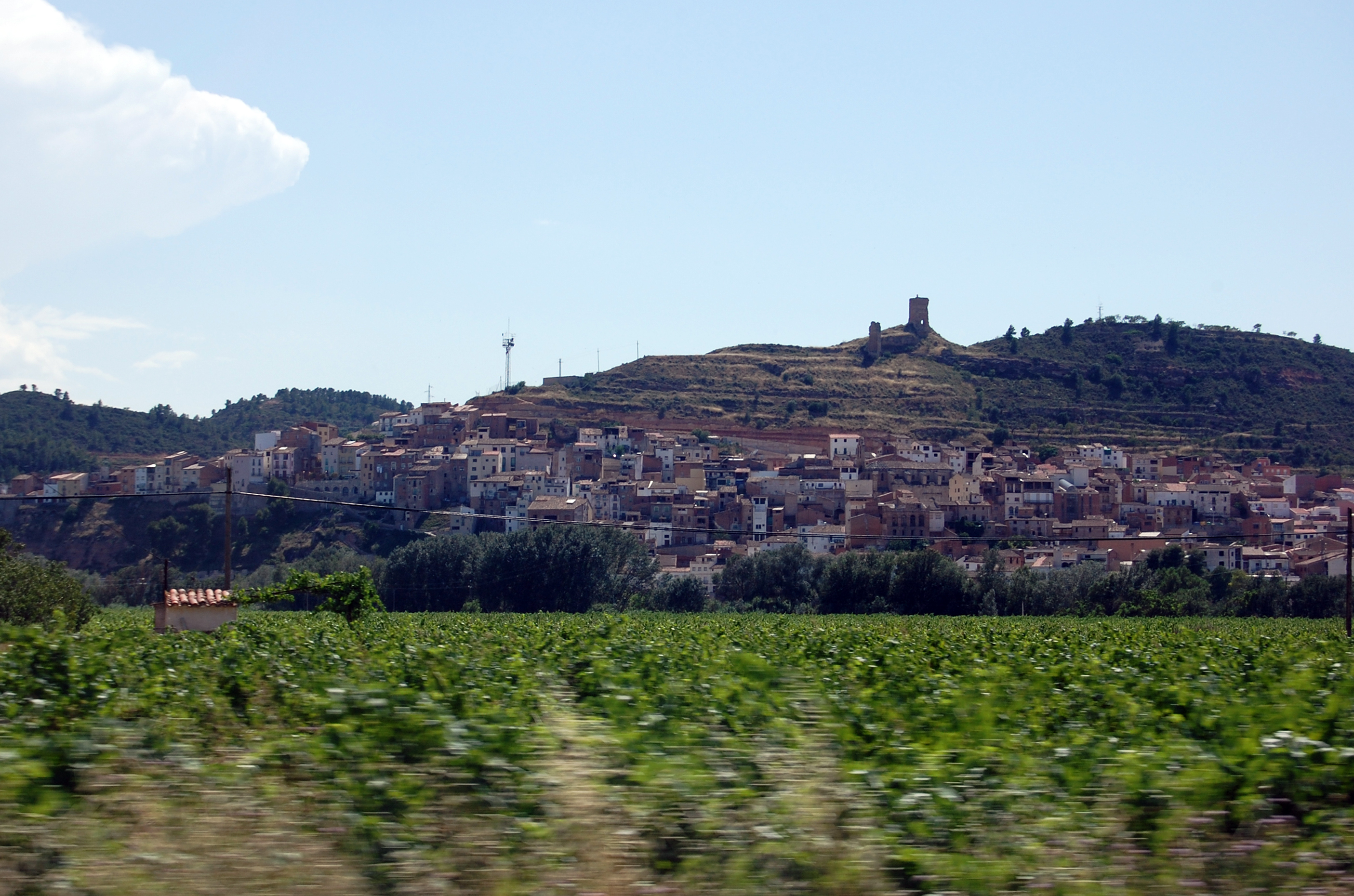
- Ascó

- Coat of arms

- Location of Ascó Ascó (Catalonia) Ascó (Spain)
- Coordinates: 41°11′N 0°34′E
- Country: Spain
- Community: Catalonia
- Province: Tarragona
- Comarca: Ribera d'Ebre

Government
  - Mayor: Josep Ma. Buixeda Ruana (2015)

Area
  - Total: 73.6 km^{2} (28.4 sq mi)
- Elevation: 70 m (230 ft)

Population (2025-01-01)
  - Total: 1,589
  - Density: 21.6/km^{2} (55.9/sq mi)
- Demonym(s): Asconenc, asconenca
- Website: asco.cat

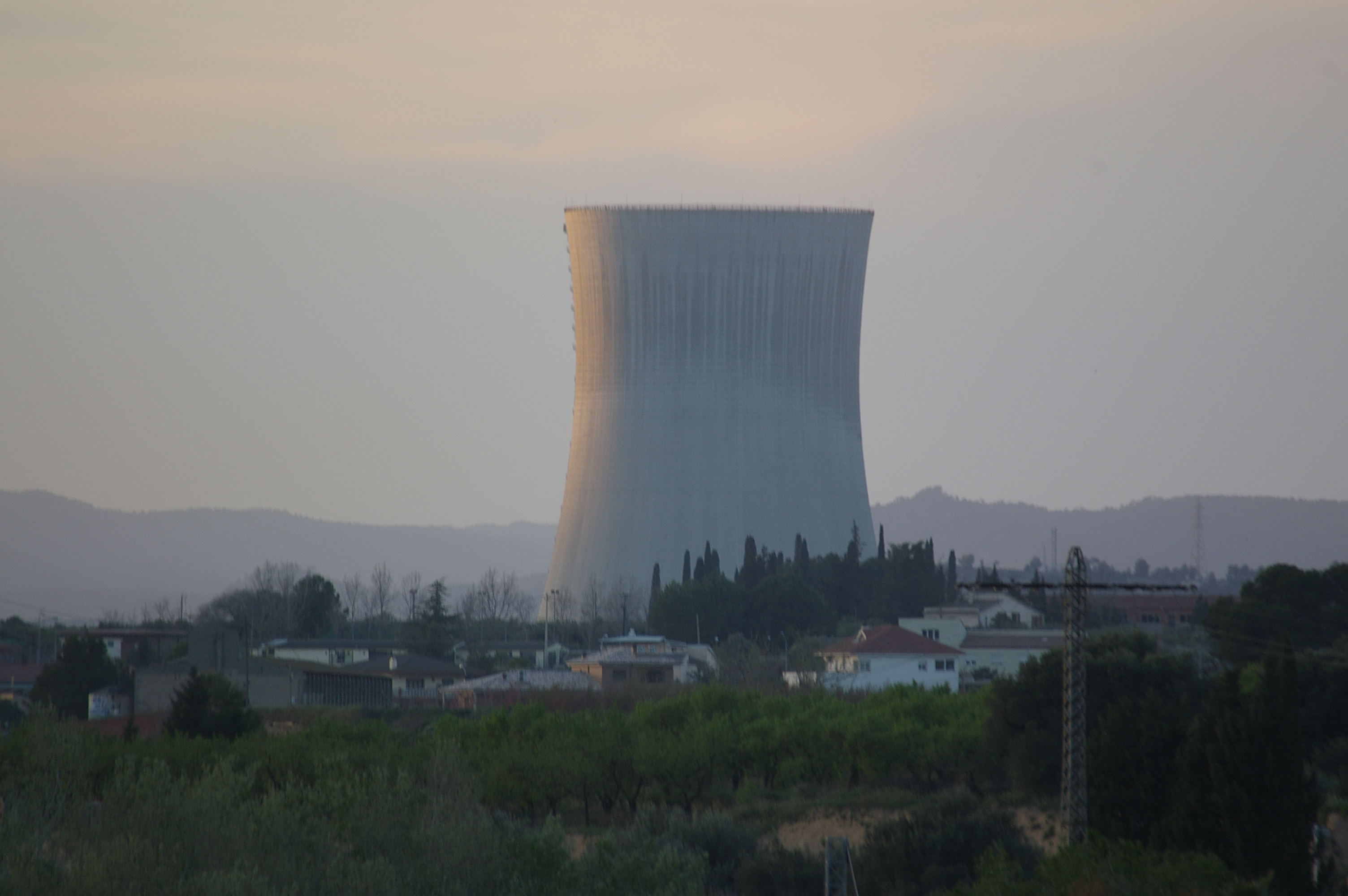
Ascó Nuclear Power Plant

Ascó (Catalan pronunciation: [asˈko]) is a large village in the comarca of Ribera d'Ebre, Catalonia, Spain, on the right bank of the Ebre river at the feet of the Serra de la Fatarella range. The village of Ascó is known for its nuclear power station, and for excellent fishing in the river.

The local economy is based upon agriculture and work at the power station. The local area is studded with groves full of almonds, olives, grapes, and occasionally citrus fruits. It is approximately 26 km (16 mi) from Mequinenza, 4.7 km (2.9 mi) from Flix, 8.6 km (5.3 mi) from Riba-roja d'Ebre and 16 km (9.9 mi) from Gandesa, in the area where the Battle of the Ebro was fought during the Spanish Civil War. The terrain is a mixture of flatland, hills, mountains, forests and farmland.

== Attractions and amenities ==
Ascó has shops, a bank, a post office, a restaurant, several tapas bars, a bakery, pharmacy, news stand, cafés, etc., all within a 3-minute walk from the river bank. There are also schools, a college, and a railway station on the main line to Valencia, Barcelona, and Zaragoza. It is less than an hour drive from Reus airport and Salou.

The village is built on the side of a hill overlooking the river and has the remains of a ruined castle on its summit. There are cycle paths and walking paths known as Vias Verdes (green ways) which follow the river and which offer views of the Ebro valley.

== Fishing ==
Zander, carp, catfish, mullet, and bass fishing is available in the river which has easy access and low banks. There are fishing guides who specialise in fishing this area. The fishing is not free and night fishing is banned. A fishing licence for Catalonia is required. Carp fishing is best in winter when the carp form huge shoals. Catfishing is best in summer when the catfish go on huge feeding frenzies. Local catfishing guides at Ascó usually stock bait and tackle.

== Demographics ==
It has a population of 1,589 (register office, 2025).

1900	1930	1950	1970	1986	2007
2499	2422	1885	1630	1847	1616

== Notable people ==
- Peter Sanz (Ascó, 22 September 1680 - Fuzhou, 26 May 1747) (Catalan: Pere Sans i Jordá, Spanish: Pedro Sans i Jordá) was a Catalan Dominican friar who was sent as a missionary bishop to China.

== Bibliography ==
- Panareda Clopés, Josep Maria; Rios Calvet, Jaume; Rabella Vives, Josep Maria (1989). Guia de Catalunya, Barcelona: Caixa de Catalunya. ISBN 84-87135-01-3 (Spanish). ISBN 84-87135-02-1 (Catalan).
