= Barranc de Gàfols =

First Bronze Age sight

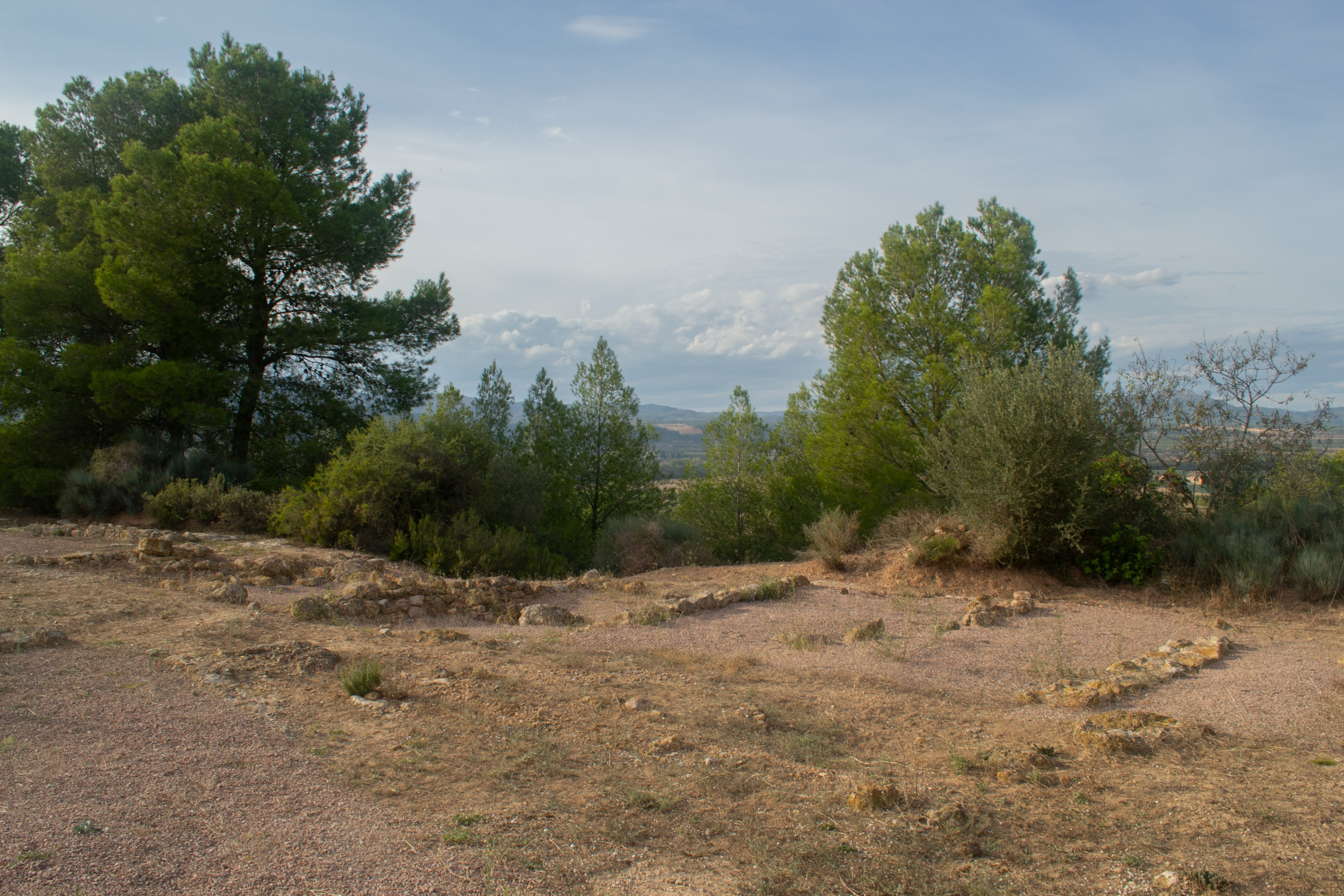
- Iron Age buildings

- Location within Catalonia
- 41°02′02″N 0°37′38″E
- Type: Settlement
- Periods: Late Bronze Age; First Iron Age
- Location: Ginestar, Province of Tarragona, Catalonia, Spain

History
- Abandoned: c. 550 BC

Site notes
- Area: 300 m^{2} (3,200 sq ft)
- Public access: Opened to public

The Barranc de Gàfols, also referred as Pomeralet, is an archaeological site in Ginestar, Catalonia. It is one of the most important First Iron Age sites in Catalonia, since it presents a continuous occupation since the Last Bronze Age.

== Geography ==
The site is located 1 km (0.62 mi) south of Ginestar, in the west bank of the river Ebro. "Barranc de Gàfols" itself is the denomination of the ravine leading close to the Ebro west of the site. In the northern part, the site is limited by cliffs. Because of this orography, the site flourished in a natural platform, 64 m (210 ft) above sea level.

== History ==
The site was first occupied during the Late Bronze Age, when cottages were established. During the First Iron Age, relatively complex rectangular and trapezoid buildings were planned, with the creation of at least 17 households and 3 streets. The structures were built with stone baseboards and adobe walls. Some of these buildings correspond to private households, since a fireplace has been found in each one of the structures, except one which has been identified as a common building devoted to agricultural activities, due to the presence of stone mills. A water basin was carved in the natural rock, possibly for animal maintenance. The economy of the settlers was based on agriculture (grapevine, acorn) and livestock and relied in subsistence, but eventually succeed in the creation of surplus, thus leading to a more complex society. Contact with Phoenician traders took place, since the presence of Phoenician amphorae has been recorded on the site. The site suffered a devastating fire that interrupted any kind of human activity around 550 BC, coinciding with the beginning of the Second Iron Age.

== Excavations ==
The site was discovered in 1988 while surveying the Rivera and Baix Ebre. In 1990, excavation works began in Gàfols and continued until 1998. Later, the unearthed structures were subjected to restoration works.
