= Norma Pujol =

Catalan teacher and politician

Member of the Congress of Deputies of Spain
- Incumbent
- Assumed office 16 May 2019
- Constituency: Tarragona

Member of Flix Municipal Council
- Incumbent
- Assumed office 2015

Personal details
- Born: Norma Pujol i Farré; 9 February 1988 (age 38) Flix, Catalonia, Spain
- Citizenship: Spanish
- Party: Republican Left of Catalonia
- Other political affiliations: Republican Left of Catalonia–Sovereigntists
- Education: University of Lleida; Autonomous University of Barcelona
- Occupation: Teacher

Norma Pujol i Farré (born 9 February 1988) is a Spanish teacher and politician from Catalonia and a member of the Congress of Deputies of Spain.

== Early life ==
Pujol was born on 9 February 1988 in Flix, (Note: Another source gives Pujol's place of birth as Lleida.) Catalonia. She has a diploma in music education from the University of Lleida (UdL) (2009) and a postgraduate qualification in music education from the Autonomous University of Barcelona (2010). In 2018 she received a postgraduate degree in management and management of educational centers from UdL.

== Career ==
Pujol has taught music in several municipalities in Catalonia since 2010 and from 2015 she worked in Ebre Zona Escolar Rural (rural school zone). She has taught music as an after-school activity at the Maristes Montserrat de Lleida and was a collaborator with the Flix Municipal School of Music and the Tivissa Music School. She was territorial co-ordinator for Terres de l'Ebre between 2016 and 2018. In September 2018 she was appointed Director General of Youth for the Government of Catalonia.

Pujol is a member of several cultural and sports organisations including the Agrupació Sardanista, Assemblea Nacional Catalana, Associació Cultural la Cana, Associació de Jocs Tothom a Taula, Centre d'Estudis de la Ribera d'Ebre, Flexus Teatre, Grup Natura Freixe and Joventut Esportiva de Flix. She was chairperson of the Flix Yacht Club from 2012 to 2015. She was part of the editorial staff of La Veu de Flix, a local news magazine, from 2008 to 2015.

Pujol has been associated with Republican Left of Catalonia (ERC) since 2007. She contested the 2015 local elections as an Entesa per Flix–Acord Municipal (EpF-AM) electoral alliance candidate in Flix and was elected. She was re-elected at the 2019 local elections. She contested the April 2019 general election as a Republican Left of Catalonia–Sovereigntists electoral alliance candidate in the Province of Tarragona and was elected to the Congress of Deputies. She was re-elected at the November 2019 general election.

== Electoral history ==
Electoral history of Norma Pujol
Election	Constituency	Party	Alliance	No.	Result
2015 local	Flix	Republican Left of Catalonia	Entesa per Flix–Acord Municipal	4	Elected
2019 April general	Province of Tarragona	Republican Left of Catalonia	Republican Left of Catalonia–Sovereigntists	2	Elected
2019 local	Flix	Republican Left of Catalonia	Esquerra Republicana de Catalunya- Entesa per Flix–Acord Municipal	3	Elected
2019 November general	Province of Tarragona	Republican Left of Catalonia	Republican Left of Catalonia–Sovereigntists	2	Elected
