= Peter Sanz =

Catalan Dominican friar, missionary and martyr (1680-1747)

Saint Peter Sanz OP
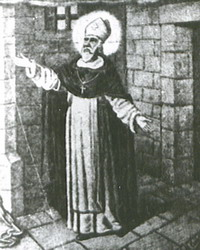
- Portrait from 18th century

Martyr
- Born: 22 September 1680; Ascó, Spain
- Died: 26 May 1747 (aged 66); Fuzhou, China
- Venerated in: Roman Catholic Church
- Beatified: 14 May 1893 by Pope Leo XIII
- Canonized: 1 October 2000 by Pope John Paul II
- Feast: 9 July (with the Martyr Saints of China)
- Attributes: Dominican habit with a mitre and pectoral cross

Peter Sanz (22 September 1680 – 26 May 1747) (Catalan: Pere Sans i Jordá, Spanish: Pedro Sans i Jordá) was a Catalan Dominican friar who was sent as a missionary bishop to China. He was declared a martyr and canonized by the Catholic Church.

== Early life ==
Sanz was born 22 September 1680 in Ascó, Ribera d'Ebre, in the Catalan region of Spain. In 1697 he professed religious vows as a member of the Dominican Order in Lerida. After completing his theological studies, he was ordained a priest on 22 September 1704.

== Mission in China ==
Sanz later volunteered and was accepted to serve in China. He was sent to the Philippines in 1713 to prepare for this mission, where he studied the Chinese language for two years. He then entered China with a small band of fellow friars, where he began a ministry which lasted over 30 years. In January 1728, the Sacred Congregation for the Propagation of the Faith named him as Coadjutor Vicar Apostolic of Fujian, for which he was consecrated a bishop on 22 February 1730 with the new titular see of Maurocastrum by the Bishop of Nanking, Emmanuel de Jesus-Maria-Joseph, with João de Casal, Bishop of Macau, and Francisco da Purificação da Rocha Froes, Bishop of Beijing, serving as co-consecrators. He succeeded to the office of Vicar in January 1732, upon the death of Magino Ventallol, who had been unable to be consecrated a bishop during the thirteen years of his administration.

== Martyrdom ==
Sanz was arrested by imperial authorities in 1741, along with four other friars. They suffered torture and a long imprisonment in Fuzhou. Finally, on 26 May 1747, Sanz was beheaded at Fuzhou. In October 1748, word came that one of his companions had been named his coadjutor bishop by the Holy See. The other friars were executed immediately upon that news.

== Beatification and canonization ==
He and his companions were beatified by Pope Leo XIII on May 14, 1893. They were included among a group of 120 saints known collectively as the Martyr Saints of China who were canonized on 1 October 2000 by Pope John Paul II. The group was given the feast day of 9 July.

Previously, their feast day was kept on June 3, which is still the date kept by Dominicans who follow the General Roman Calendar of 1960 as part of the traditional Dominican Rite, which was in place before the changes that occurred after Vatican II. The keeping of the General Roman Calendar of 1960 is in accordance with the universal permissions which were clarified in Summorum Pontificum.
