= Puntal dels Escambrons =

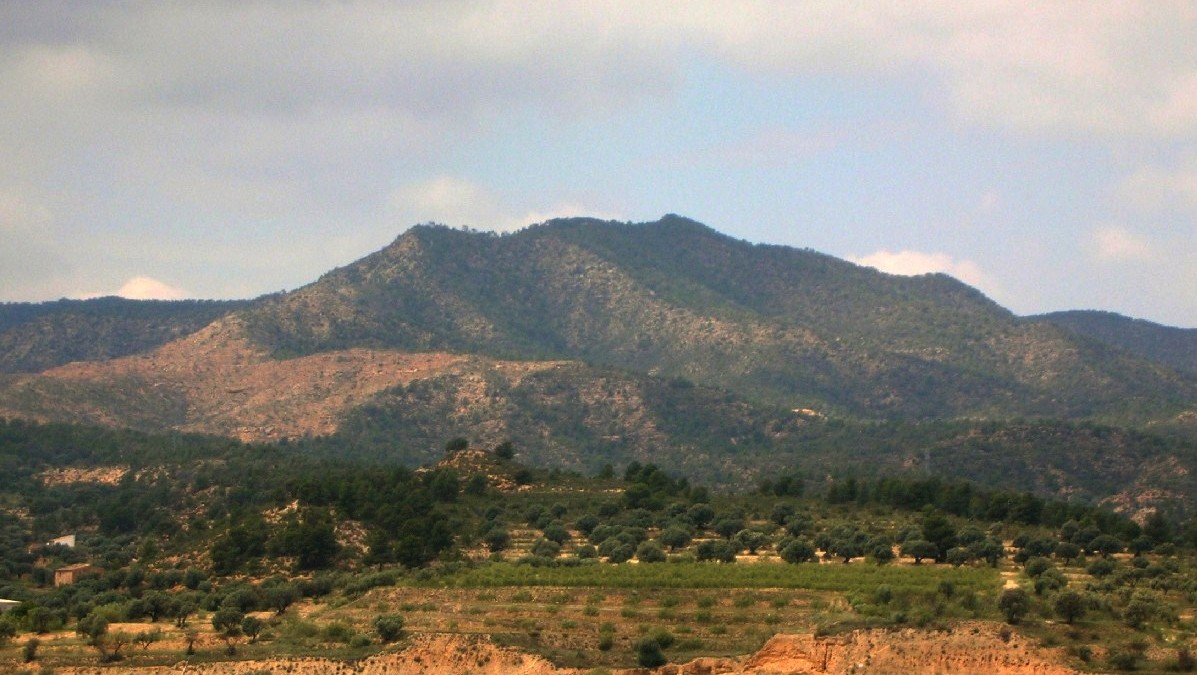
- Puntal dels Escambrons seen from Riba-roja d'Ebre

Highest point
- Elevation: 495 m (1,624 ft)
- Coordinates: 41°16′33″N 0°25′57″E

Geography
- Location within Catalonia
- Location: Segrià, Ribera d'Ebre, Catalonia
- Parent range: Isolated hill in the Catalan Central Depression

Geology
- Mountain type: Conglomerate

Climbing
- First ascent: Unknown
- Easiest route: From Riba-roja d'Ebre or Almatret

Puntal dels Escambrons is a mountain of Catalonia, Spain.

== Geography ==
With an elevation of 495 metres above sea level the Puntal dels Escambrons is the highest hill of the Segrià comarca. It is located in the Almatret, Segrià, and Riba-roja d'Ebre, Ribera d'Ebre, municipal limits.

A wind farm, the Parc Eòlic Els Escambrons is being built on this mountain and neighboring ridges.

== See also ==
- Mountains of Catalonia
