= Miravet =

- Municipality
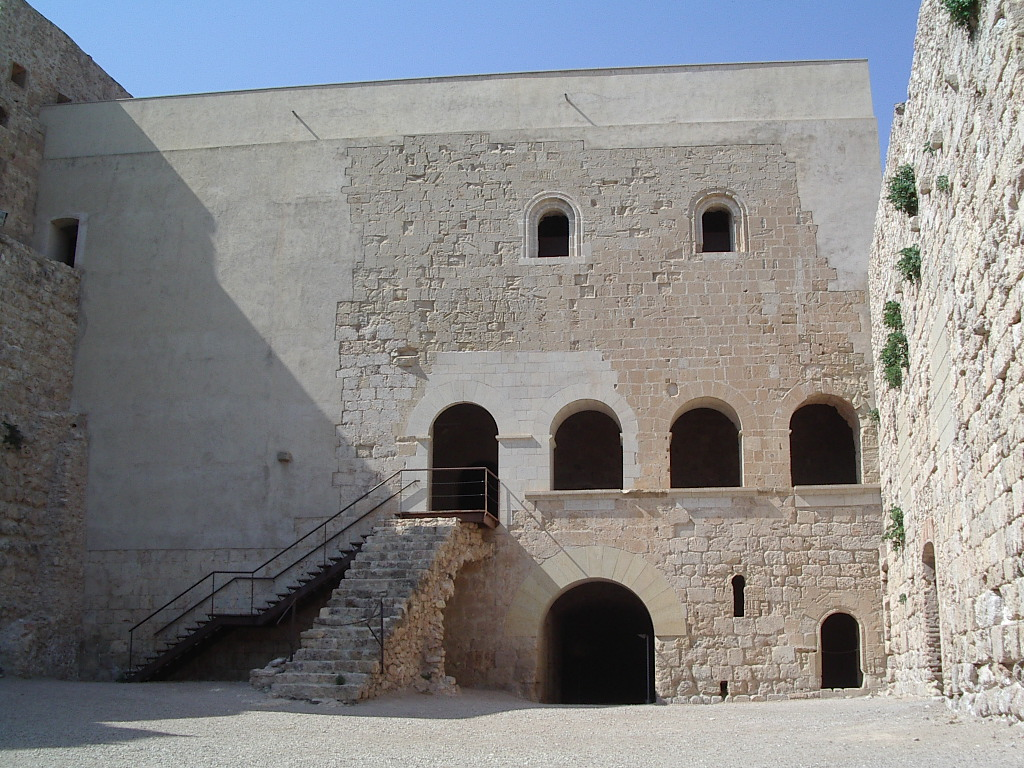
- Inner courtyard at Miravet castle

- Coat of arms

- Location in Catalonia
- Coordinates: 41°2′N 0°36′E
- Country: Spain
- Community: Catalonia
- Province: Tarragona
- Comarca: Ribera d'Ebre

Government
  - Mayor: Antoni Borrell Vives (2015)

Area
  - Total: 32.3 km^{2} (12.5 sq mi)

Population (2025-01-01)
  - Total: 703
  - Density: 21.8/km^{2} (56.4/sq mi)
- Website: www.miravet.cat

Miravet (Catalan pronunciation: [miraˈβet]) is a municipality in the comarca of Ribera d'Ebre in the Province of Tarragona, Catalonia, Spain. It has a population of 703 (register office, 2025).

The village and the castle was founded by the Moors and rebuilt by the Knights Templar and transformed into a fortress-monastery, after the conquest of 1153. It is considered to be the largest fortified complex in Catalonia, and one of the best examples of Romanesque, religious and military, architecture of the Templar order in the whole Western world.

== History ==
In the Spanish Civil War of 1936-1939 it was one of the scenes of the Battle of the Ebro. The 4th November 1938, the fascists occupied Miravent and continued east of the Ebro river.

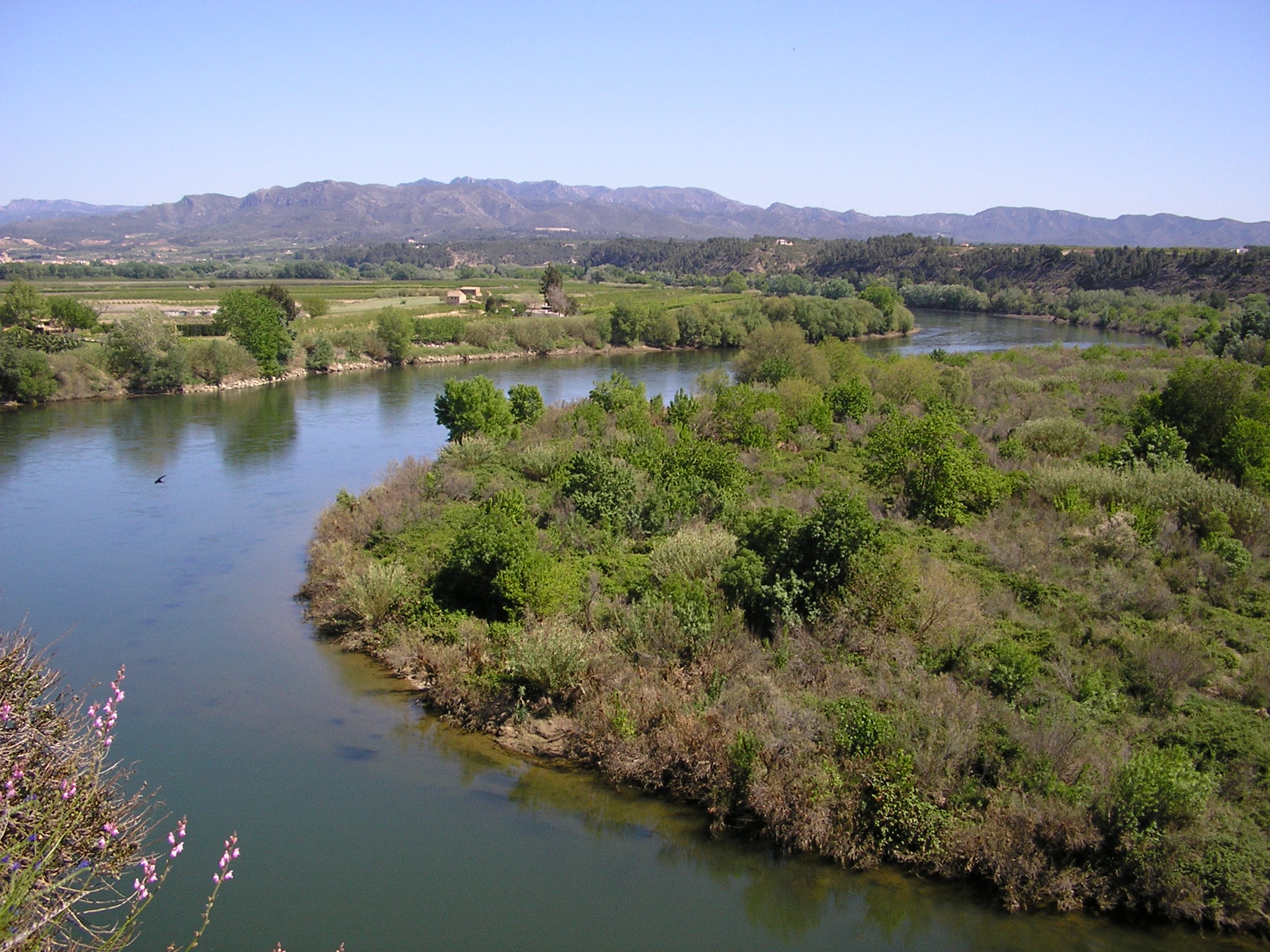
Ebre in Miravet
