= Vinebre =

- Municipality
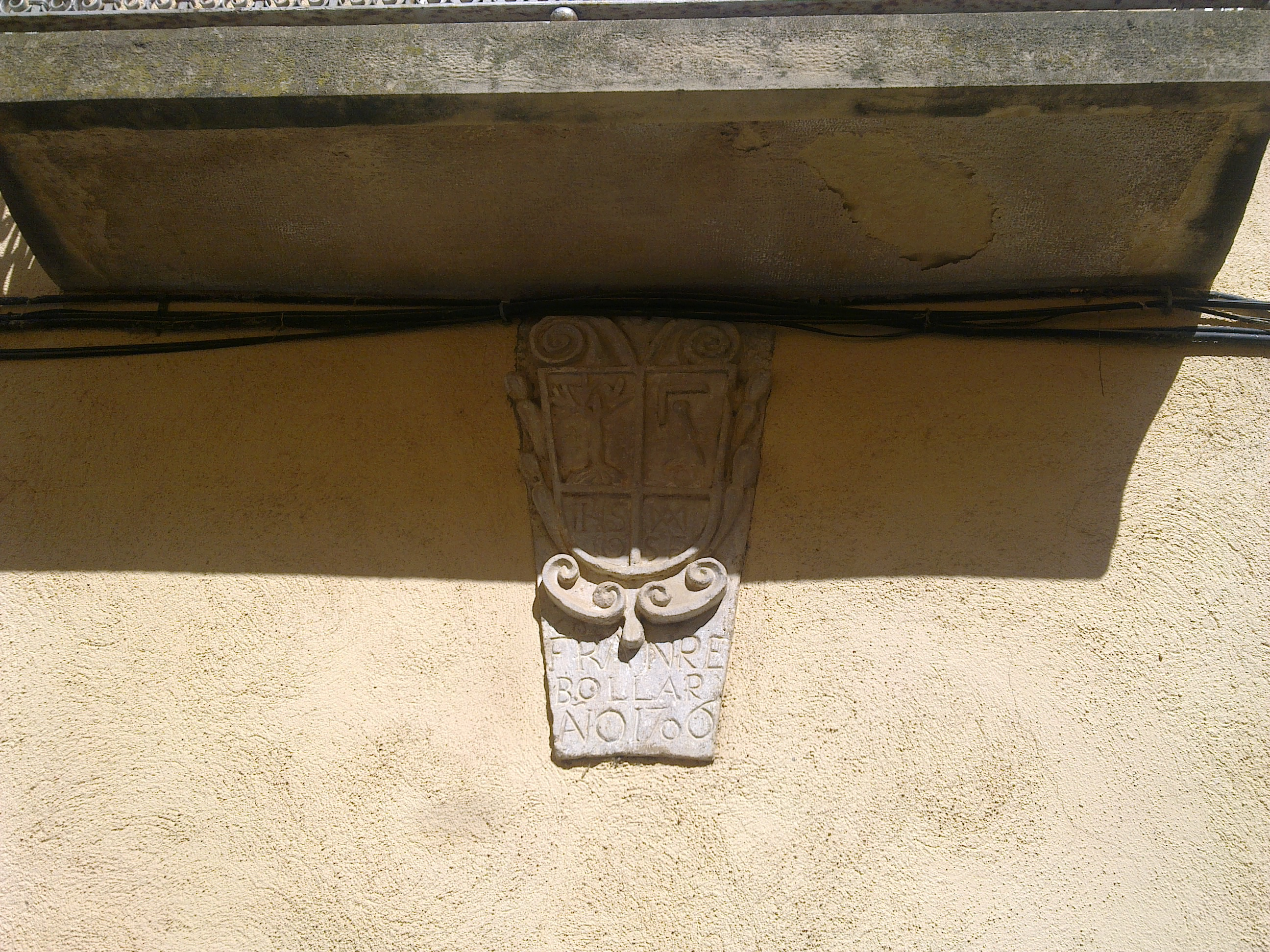
- Coat of arms on Ca Martí, a national monument

- Coat of arms

- Location in Catalonia
- Coordinates: 41°11′09″N 0°35′25″E
- Country: Spain
- Community: Catalonia
- Province: Tarragona
- Comarca: Ribera d'Ebre

Government
  - Mayor: Gema Carim Gironès (2015)

Area
  - Total: 26.4 km^{2} (10.2 sq mi)
- Elevation: 34 m (112 ft)

Population (2025-01-01)
  - Total: 427
  - Density: 16.2/km^{2} (41.9/sq mi)
- Demonym: Vinebrà
- Postal code: 43792
- Website: www.vinebre.cat

Vinebre (Catalan pronunciation: [biˈneβɾe]) is a municipality in the comarca of Ribera d'Ebre in the province of Tarragona, Catalonia, Spain. It has a population of 427 (register office, 2025).

== Notable people ==
- Enric d'Ossó i Cervelló
- Albert Viaplana i Veà
