= Betekom =

Village in Belgium

Coordinates: 50°59′12″N 4°46′54″E

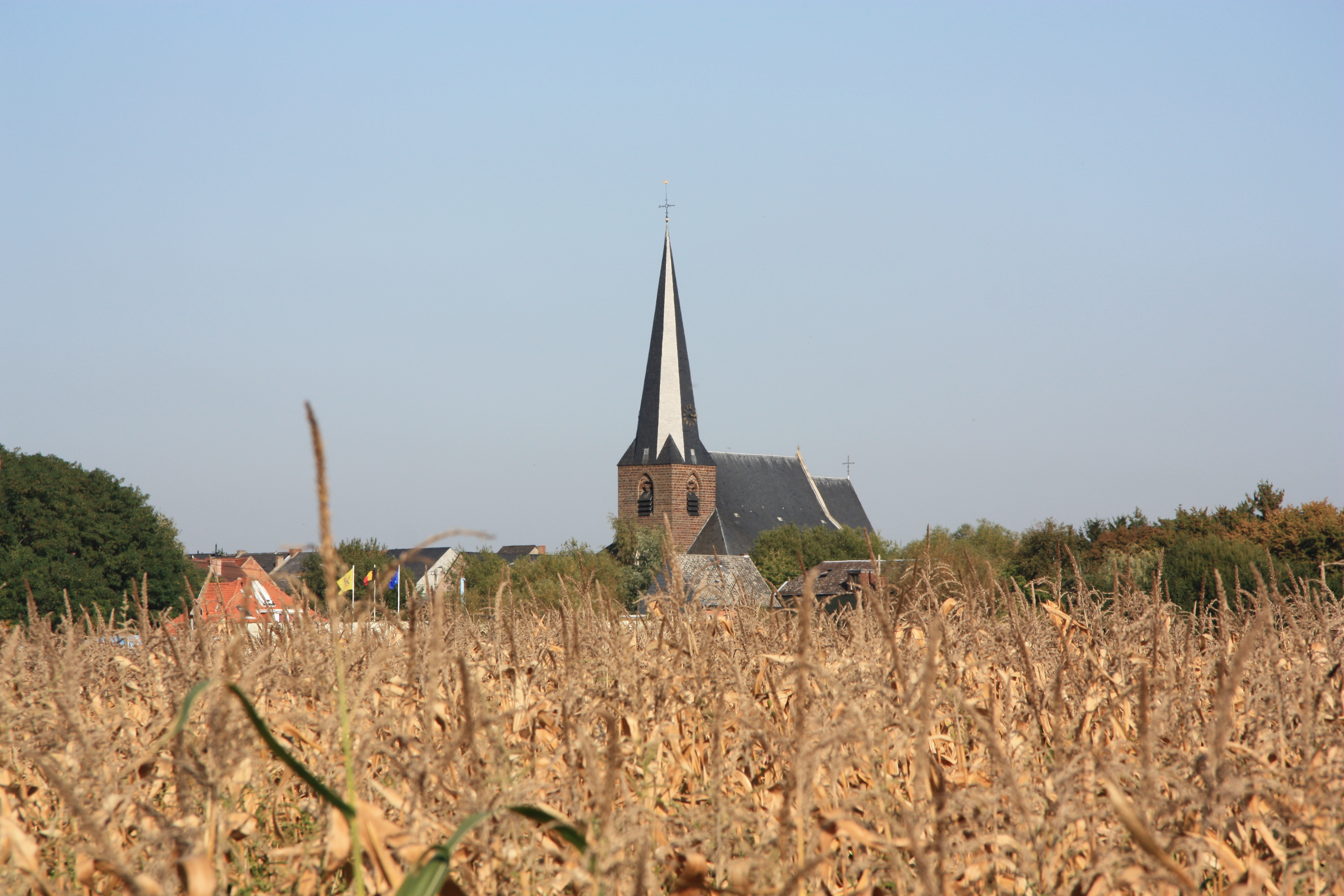
Betekom with the church visible

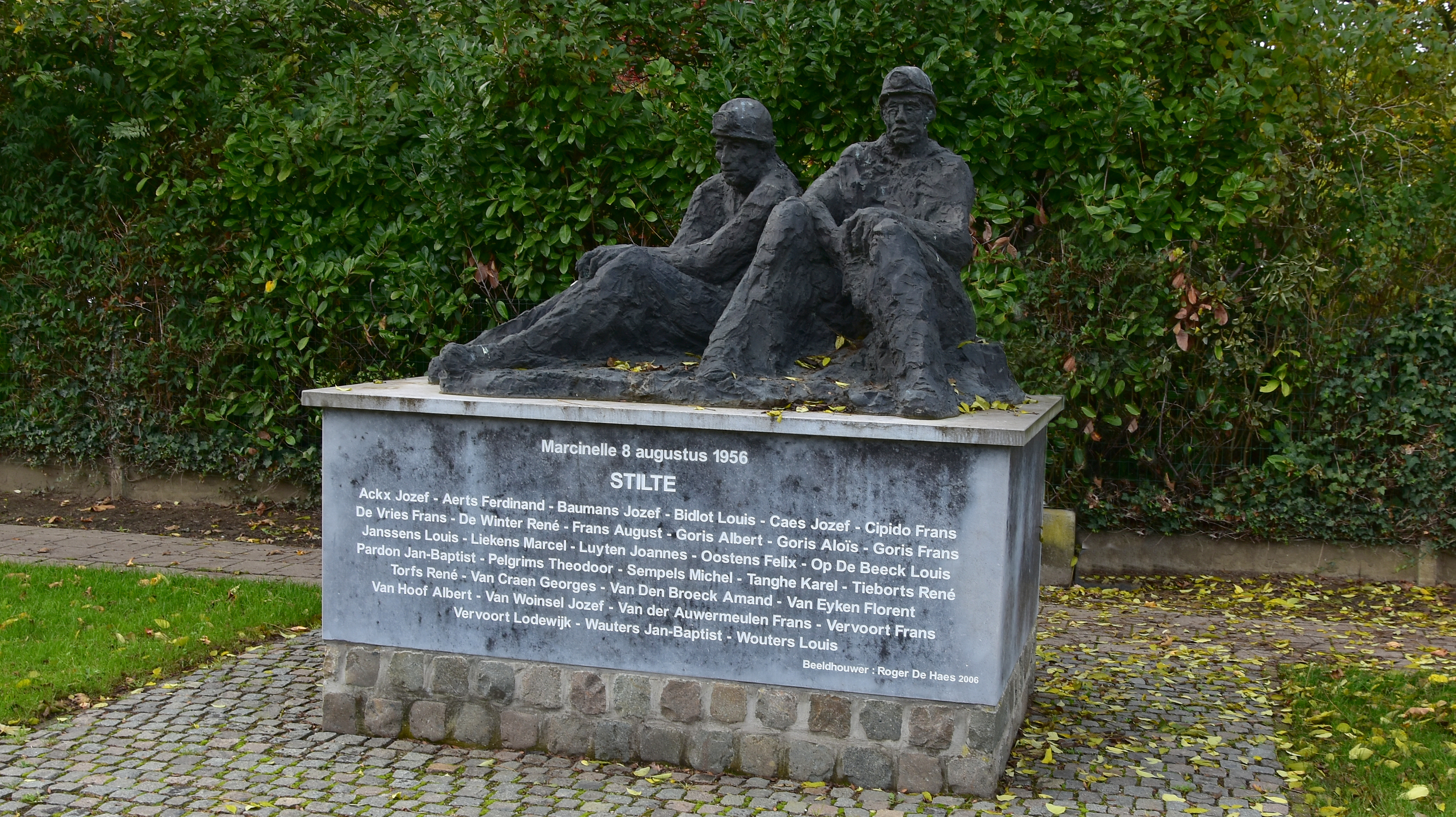
The memorial for the miners in Betekom who died in the Marcinelle mining disaster

Betekom is a village in the Belgian province of Flemish Brabant and is a submunicipality of Begijnendijk. It was an independent municipality until the municipal reorganization of 1977. Rene Goriens, mayor of since 1964, became the mayor of the new formed municipality.

The water mill Leefdaele mill was built before 1378 and is a protected monument.

The village centre has been a protected townscape since 1980 and has been an architectural heritage site since 2021. There are several 18th and 19th century buildings.
