= Maurocastrum =

Town in Ukraine

The town of Maurocastrum (Medieval Greek: Μαυρόκαστρον, lit. 'Black Castle') was a settlement on the banks of the Dniester River, now the city of Bilhorod-Dnistrovskyi, Ukraine, in the 6th century BC. It later came under successive Greek, Roman and Byzantine rule. Under the Treaty of Nymphaion of 1261, the city came under the control of the Republic of Genoa. Called Mauricastro by them, it then became a base for trading by Genoese merchants with both the Byzantine Empire and the Mongol Empire.

The city was historically known in Romanian as Cetatea Albă, as well as in Turkish as Akkerman, or variations of the Turkish name.

In 1359 the city became part of the Principality of Moldavia. The fortress city was enlarged and rebuilt in 1407 under Alexander the Good and in 1440 under Stephen II of Moldavia. In 1420, the citadel was attacked for the first time by the Ottomans, but defended successfully by Moldavian Prince Alexander the Good. It fell to Ottoman conquest on August 5, 1487. The Ottomans claimed to have reached an agreement with Prince Stephen, and promised safe passage to the inhabitants and their belongings; however, most of the city-dwellers were slaughtered. Later, attempts by Stephen the Great to restore his rule over the area were unsuccessful. Cetatea Albă was subsequently a base from which the Ottomans were able to attack Moldavia proper.

For Roman Catholics, the territory was part of the Apostolic Vicariate of Tartary, under the spiritual care of the Franciscan friars. It also served as the seat of a local bishop of the Eastern Orthodox Church. The presence of an Orthodox bishop during this period is noted in a list of bishoprics under the authority of the Patriarchate of Constantinople during the reign of the Emperor Andronikos II Palaiologos.

For some time the title of Bishop of Maurocastrum was conferred on titular bishops of the Catholic Church, who were serving mission territories. It was first given in 1728 to Saint Peter Sanz, O.P., who was named a bishop to serve in China. The last bishop to be given this title was Walter Staal, S.J., (1839–1897) a missionary to the Dutch East Indies. Perhaps because of lack of evidence of it having been an ancient bishopric, it is no longer classified as a Catholic titular see and does not appear in the Catholic Church's list of titular sees.
