= Enric d'Ossó i Cervelló =

Spanish Catholic priest (1840–1896)

Saint Enrique de Ossó i Cervelló OCDS
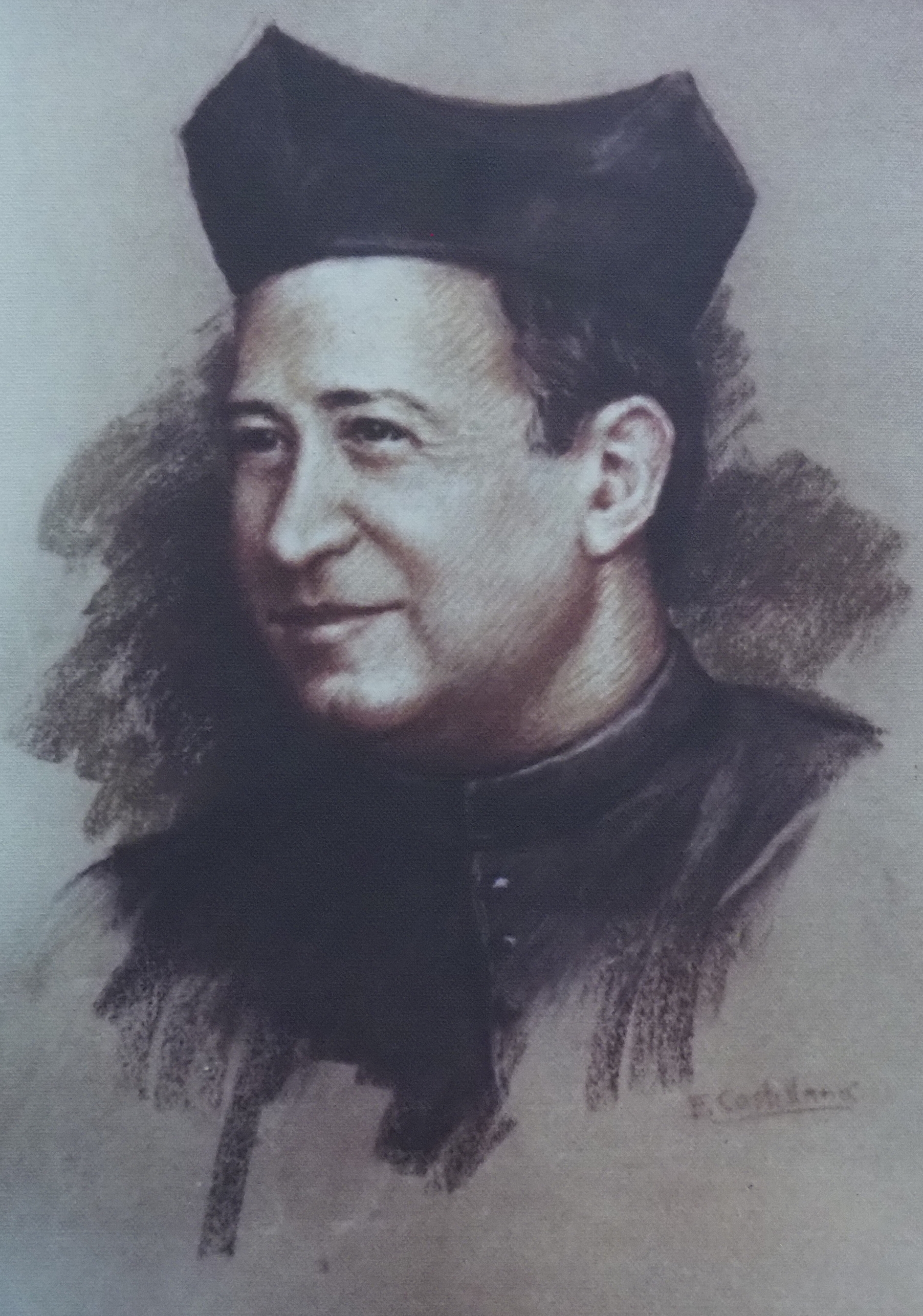
- Born: 16 October 1840; Vinebre, Tarragona, Kingdom of Spain
- Died: 27 January 1896 (aged 55); Gilet, Valencia, Kingdom of Spain
- Venerated in: Catholic Church
- Beatified: 14 October 1979, Saint Peter's Square, Vatican City by Pope John Paul II
- Canonized: 16 June 1993, Madrid, Spain by Pope John Paul II
- Feast: 27 January

Enric d'Ossó i Cervelló (16 October 1840 - 27 January 1896) was a Spanish Catholic priest and the founder of the Society of Saint Teresa of Jesus. He served the role of an educator and an able catechist and published several works on catechesis to that effect while also expressing a keen interest in the value of women and in Teresa of Ávila to whom he dedicated his congregation.

== Life ==
Enric d'Ossó i Cervelló was born on 16 October 1840 as the last of three children born to wealthy farmers Jaime de Ossó and Micaela Cervelló. His brother was Jaime. His brother Jaime's son was Lluís de Ossó who helped found FC Barcelona and was one of its first players.

His father had been opposed to his being a priest (while his mother favored it) and in 1852 therefore sent him to become an apprentice in the textile business in Quinto; despite this setback he learnt the trade from his uncle who took care of him. But it was there that he became ill to the point where his First Communion was received as the Viaticum though he managed to recover and returned home while stopping off at a Marian shrine along the route to give thanks for his health's restoration.

Some time after the death of his mother in 1854 during a cholera outbreak he fled to Montserrat in order to realize his dream and attempted to seek refuge there though his brother Jamie took him home. It was when he returned that his father understood his son's desire and so relented to his son's wishes and agreed to his becoming a priest and so began his studies for the priesthood in 1854. He studied theology in Barcelona where he was made a sub-deacon and later studied at Tortosa before he was ordained to the priesthood on 21 September 1867; he had been a classmate of Emmanuel Domingo i Sol. The new priest celebrated his first Mass in Montserrat on 6 October 1867 and began to teach mathematics to seminarians in Tortosa. The political conflicts, with liberal and anti-Catholic airs, forced him to seclude himself with the seminarians in the episcopal palace as well as in various homes. In this way he was able to continue training them.

In 1873 he founded the Association of Young Catholic Daughters of Mary and Saint Teresa of Jesus (which Pope Pius IX elevated as a confraternity in 1875) and in 1876 founded the Josephine Sisterhood. He became active as a catechist and to that effect wrote various works including one for children. He was seen as a brilliant catechist; he founded and wrote for the publication known as "The Man". In 1871 he began in 1871 publication of the weekly El amigo del pueblo ("The Friend of the People") which was suppressed by the government the following year, but was immediately followed by the monthly magazine "The Teresian Review" (1872). He remained its director until his death. He made a point of aiming most of his writings towards women. He had a particular interest in the value of women and in Teresa of Ávila.

On 23 June 1876, with the help of Teresa Blanch, Osso founded the "Society of Saint Teresa of Jesus" in Tarragona, an order to educate women. It received the decree of praise from Pope Leo XIII on 22 September 1888 and approval from the Spanish government on 1 May 1883. Within his lifetime, it had spread to Portugal, Mexico and Uruguay.

He hailed the release of the latter pope's encyclical "Rerum Novarum" in mid-1881 for its emphasis of Catholic social teachings. He was also particularly concerned with the revival of convents that had been abolished by the Spanish government, which had previously been hostile to religion; thus he became the founder of the convent of the Carmelite nuns in Tortosa and a special promoter of the convent on Montserrat.

His later years were difficult, beset with setbacks, misunderstandings with superiors, and illness. The priest died of a sudden stroke while working with his friend, Emmanuel Domingo i Sol, to develop a Josephine order for men on 27 January 1896 at the Franciscan convent of the Holy Spirit. His remains were later - in July 1908 - relocated into the chapel of his order at Tortosa. His order now exists in places such as France and Costa Rica and as of 2005 had 1620 religious in a total of 220 houses. Full papal approval of the order came from Pope Pius X on 18 December 1903 while the pope's predecessor approved the order's constitutions and Pope Paul VI reconfirmed a new one after it was amended due to the Second Vatican Council.

== Sainthood ==
In 1923 an attempt was made to open the cause for the canonization of Enric d'Ossó, but due to secret denunciations the previous phase was stopped in 1927, but resumed in 1957. The formal introduction to the cause came on 15 July 1965 under Pope Paul VI in which the late priest was titled as a Servant of God.

The newly formed Congregation for the Causes of Saints validated these processes in Rome on 21 June 1969 while their consultants and officials met and approved the cause on 2 December 1975 before the C.C.S. on its own approved it on 27 January 1976. Paul VI approved that the priest lived a life of heroic virtue and titled him as Venerable on 15 May 1976.

The miracle that led to his beatification was that of Antonia Barrera Reig - of his order - who was healed of severe tuberculosis that damaged her stomach and intestines on 15 July 1923. The informative process spanned from 1926 until 1927 while the apostolic process for that same miracle spanned from 1966 until 1967, receiving formal validation from the C.C.S. on 21 June 1969. A medical board approved it on 21 September 1977 as did the C.C.S. and their consultants on 17 October 1978 and then the C.C.S. themselves on 30 January 1979. The newly elected Pope John Paul II approved it on 10 May 1979 and beatified him on 14 October 1979.

The second and final miracle required for full sainthood was investigated and then validated in Rome on 18 May 1990 in a move that allowed for a team of medical experts to approve it on 26 February 1992 and for a board of theologians to do so as well on 30 June 1992; the C.C.S. also did this on 1 December 1992. John Paul II approved it on 21 December 1992 and then canonized the priest on 16 June 1993 while visiting Madrid at the time.

John Paul II also proclaimed him as the patron saint of catechists on 6 November 1998 in a formal decree that the Congregation for Divine Worship and the Discipline of the Sacraments issued.

== See also ==
- Catholic Church in Spain
- Chronological list of saints and blesseds
