= La Palma d'Ebre =

- Municipality
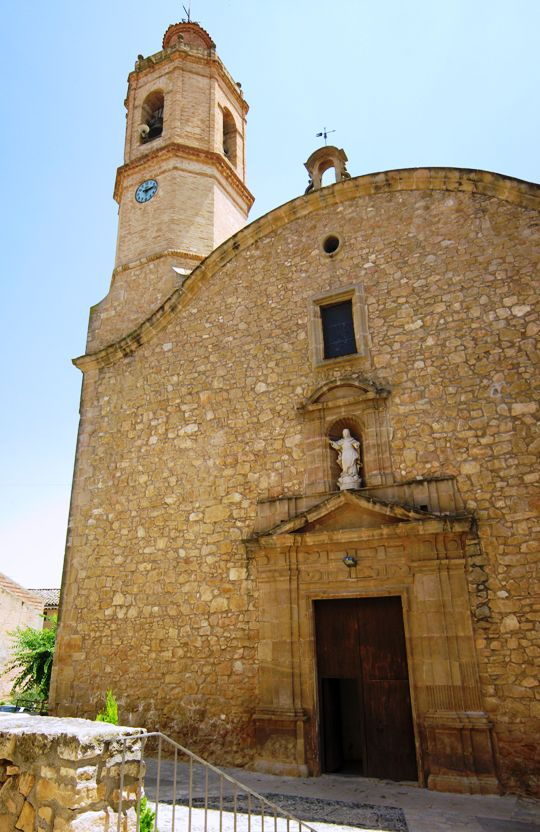
- Church of Mother of God of the Assumption

- Coat of arms

- Location in Catalonia
- Coordinates: 41°17′4″N 0°40′1″E
- Country: Spain
- Community: Catalonia
- Province: Tarragona
- Comarca: Ribera d'Ebre

Government
  - mayor: Gil Marti Jove (2015)

Area
  - Total: 37.9 km^{2} (14.6 sq mi)
- Elevation: 335 m (1,099 ft)

Population (2025-01-01)
  - Total: 333
  - Density: 8.79/km^{2} (22.8/sq mi)
- Demonym(s): Palmenc, palmenca
- Postal code: 43370
- Website: www.palmadebre.cat

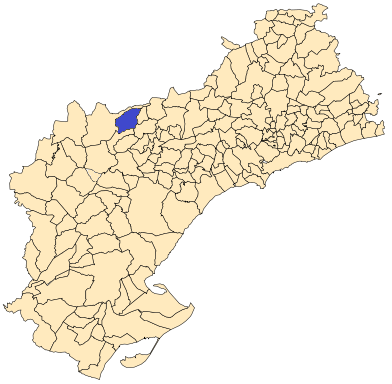
Location of La Palma d'Ebre municipal term within Tarragona Province

La Palma d'Ebre (Catalan pronunciation: [la ˈpalmɛ ˈðeβɾe]) is a municipality in the comarca of Ribera d'Ebre, Tarragona Province, Catalonia, Spain. Despite its name, it is not located close to the Ebre river. There is a reservoir less than 1 km north of the town. It has a population of 333 (register office, 2025).

== Monuments ==
The 12th century Mare de Déu del Roser church, also known as "Església Vella".

== Bibliography ==
- Panareda Clopés, Josep Maria; Rios Calvet, Jaume; Rabella Vives, Josep Maria (1989). Guia de Catalunya, Barcelona: Caixa de Catalunya. ISBN 84-87135-01-3 (Spanish). ISBN 84-87135-02-1 (Catalan).
