= Ginestar =

- Municipality
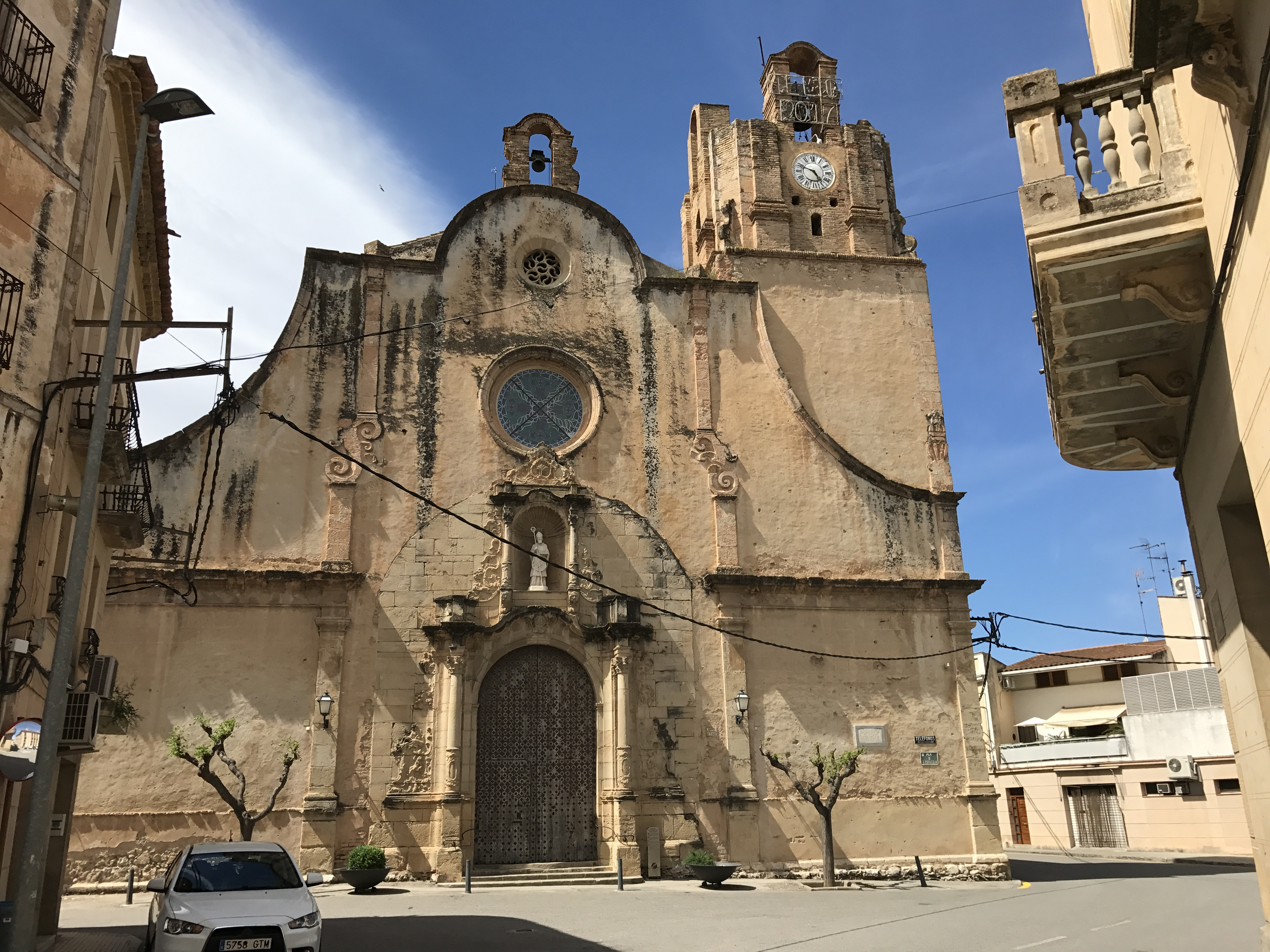

- Flag Coat of arms

- Location in Catalonia
- Coordinates: 41°2′37″N 0°38′5″E
- Country: Spain
- Community: Catalonia
- Province: Tarragona
- Comarca: Ribera d'Ebre

Government
  - Mayor: Concepció Pujol Sarroca (2015)

Area
  - Total: 15.8 km^{2} (6.1 sq mi)

Population (2025-01-01)
  - Total: 800
  - Density: 51/km^{2} (130/sq mi)
- Website: www.ginestar.cat

Ginestar (Catalan pronunciation: [dʒinesˈta]) is a municipality in the comarca of Ribera d'Ebre in the province of Tarragona, Catalonia, Spain.

This traditional Catalan village, with a population of 800 (register office, 2025) , still retains many of its traditions and farming methods, and its broad and narrow streets are lined with traditional Catalan houses.

Located only a short distance from the river Ebro, this is also becoming a popular destination for anglers from all over Europe. It is as well situated in a rich archaeological zone, including the site of the Barranc de Gàfols.

Crops grown in this area are mostly vines, olives and almonds; soft fruits are also grown and the village is alive in the summer months with farmers gathering their crops and preparing them for transport to the wholesalers.

There are several festes majors in Ginestar, which usually commence in April and continue through till November, when the village celebrates its patron saint's day, Sant Martí.
