= Almatret =

Municipality in Catalonia

- Municipality
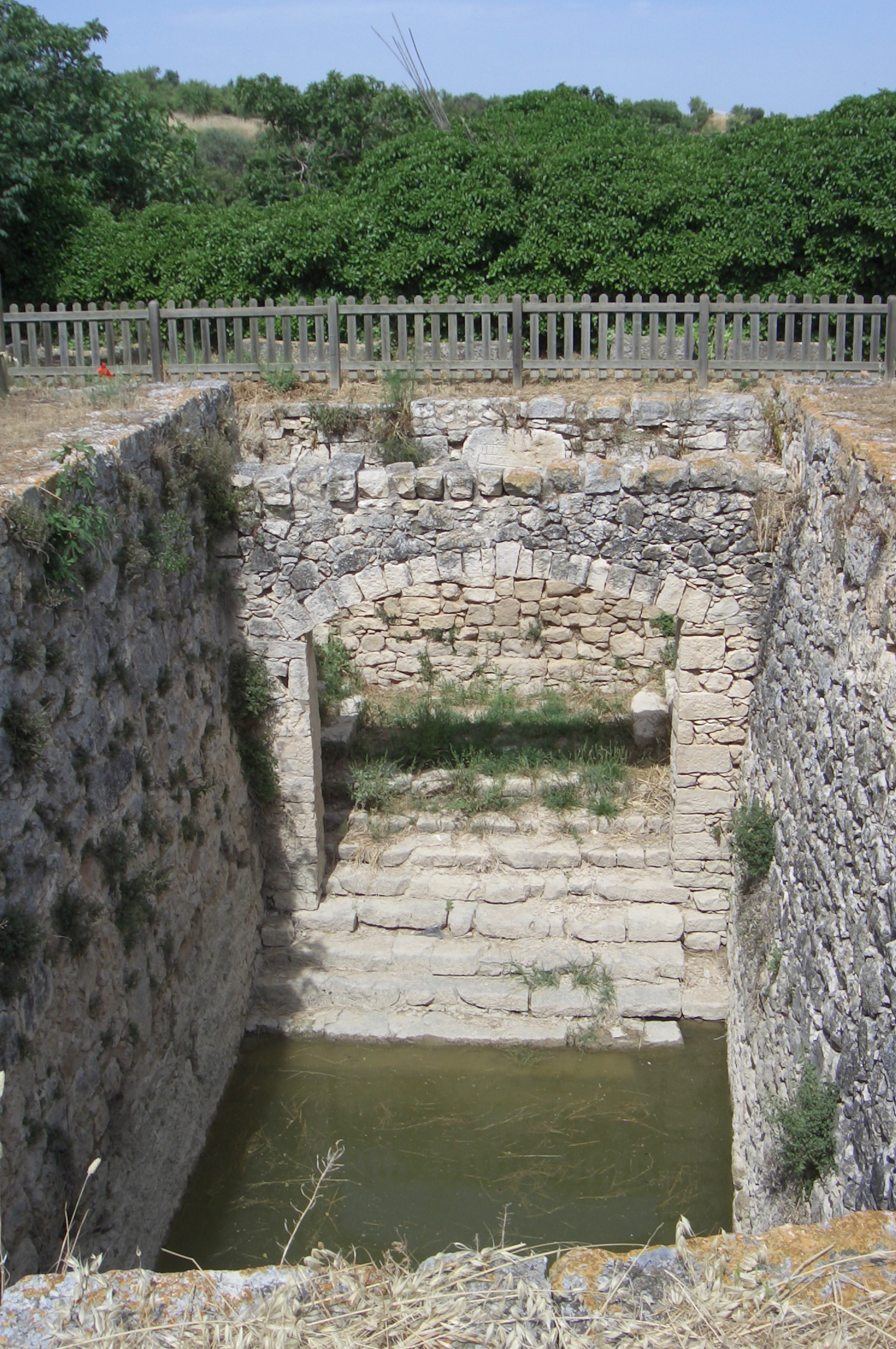
- Well in Almatret

- Flag Coat of arms

- Location in Catalonia
- Coordinates: 41°18′27″N 0°25′30″E
- Country: Spain
- Community: Catalonia
- Province: Lleida
- Comarca: Segrià

Government
  - mayor: David Romaní Vazquez (2015)

Area
  - Total: 56.8 km^{2} (21.9 sq mi)
- Elevation: 462 m (1,516 ft)

Population (2025-01-01)
  - Total: 292
  - Density: 5.14/km^{2} (13.3/sq mi)
- Demonyms: Almatretà, almatretana
- Postal code: 250208
- Website: almatret.cat

Almatret (Catalan pronunciation: [almaˈtɾet]) is a municipality in the comarca of the Segrià in Catalonia, Spain.

The town is standing on a hill overlooking the Ebre River. Almatret has a population of 292 (register office, 2025), it has lost population since year 1920 when it had 1545 inhabitants. The economy is based on the produce of the olive and almond trees growing on the dry slopes of this hilly area.

== See also ==
- Puntal dels Escambrons
