= Angleur =

Section of Liège, Belgium

Angleur Angleûr (Walloon)
- Sub-municipality of Liège
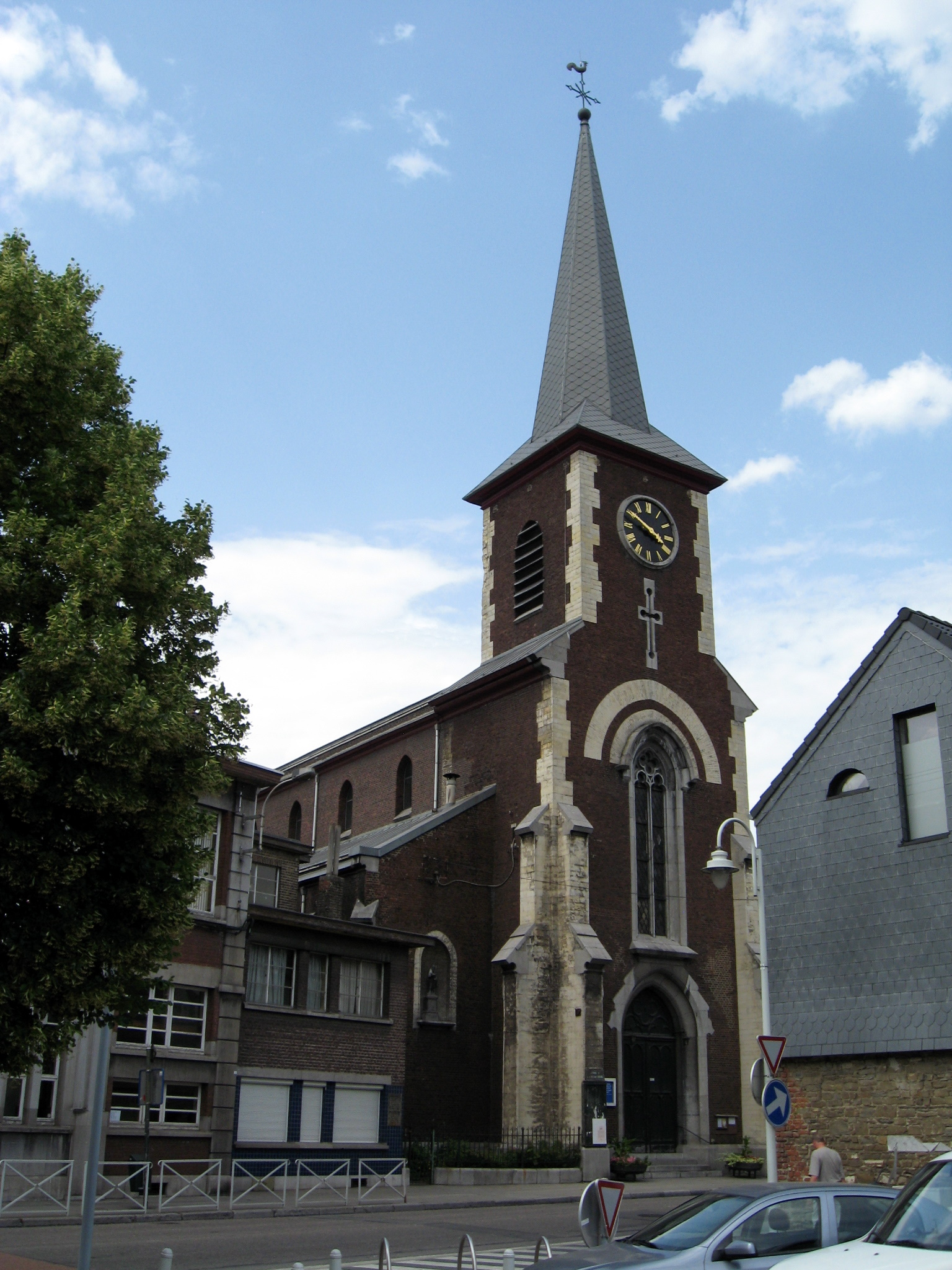
- Saint-Remy church
- Interactive map of Angleur
- Location within Belgium Location within Liège Province
- Coordinates: 50°36′43″N 5°36′00″E
- Country: Belgium
- Community: French Community
- Region: Wallonia
- Province: Liège
- Arrondissement: Liège
- Municipality: Liège

Area
  - Total: 15.02 km^{2} (5.80 sq mi)

Population (2020-01-01)
  - Total: 10,882
  - Density: 724.5/km^{2} (1,876/sq mi)
- Postal codes: 4031
- Area codes: 04

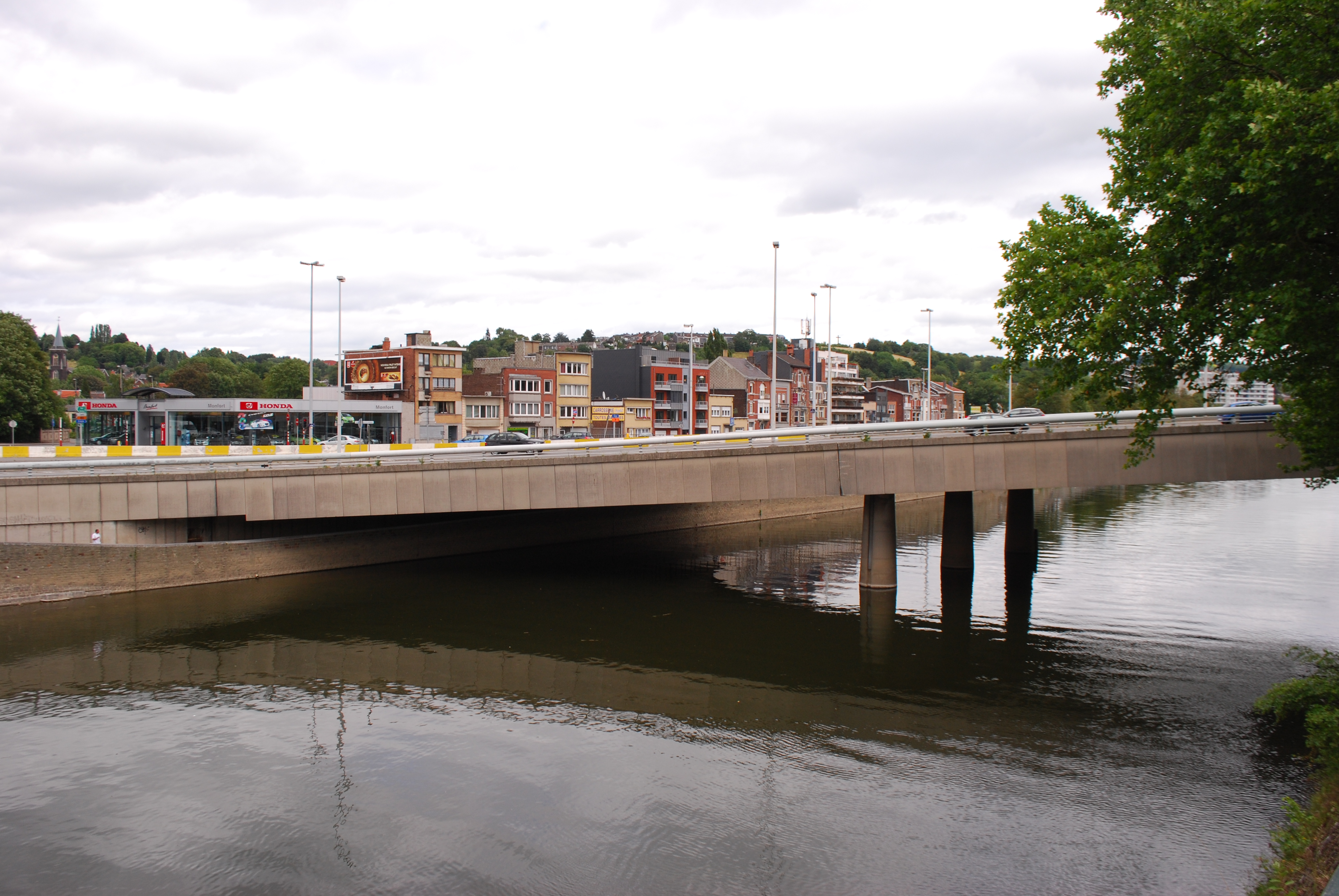
The Grosses Battes bridge, on the Ourthe in Liège.

Angleur (French pronunciation: [ɑ̃ɡlœʁ]; Walloon: Angleûr) is a sub-municipality of the city of Liège located in the province of Liège, Wallonia, Belgium. It was a separate municipality until 1977. On 1 January 1977, it was merged into Liège.

It is located at the foot and on the slope of a hill in the southern part of Liège, located between the rivers Ourthe and Meuse. The lower part involves an area known as Renory and a railway station called Gare d'Angleur and the higher part is located around the roundabout of Sart Tilman where the Liège Science Park is located. Two mansions can be found in the lower part of Angleur : the Chateau Péralta and the Chateau Nagelmackers

On the 24th of July 2019, during the July 2019 European heat wave, the hottest temperate ever recorded in Belgium at the time was recorded in Angleur, a temperature of 40.2 °C, however this recorded was again broken the next day in the Flemish town of Begijnendijk.
