= La Torre de l'Espanyol =

- Municipality
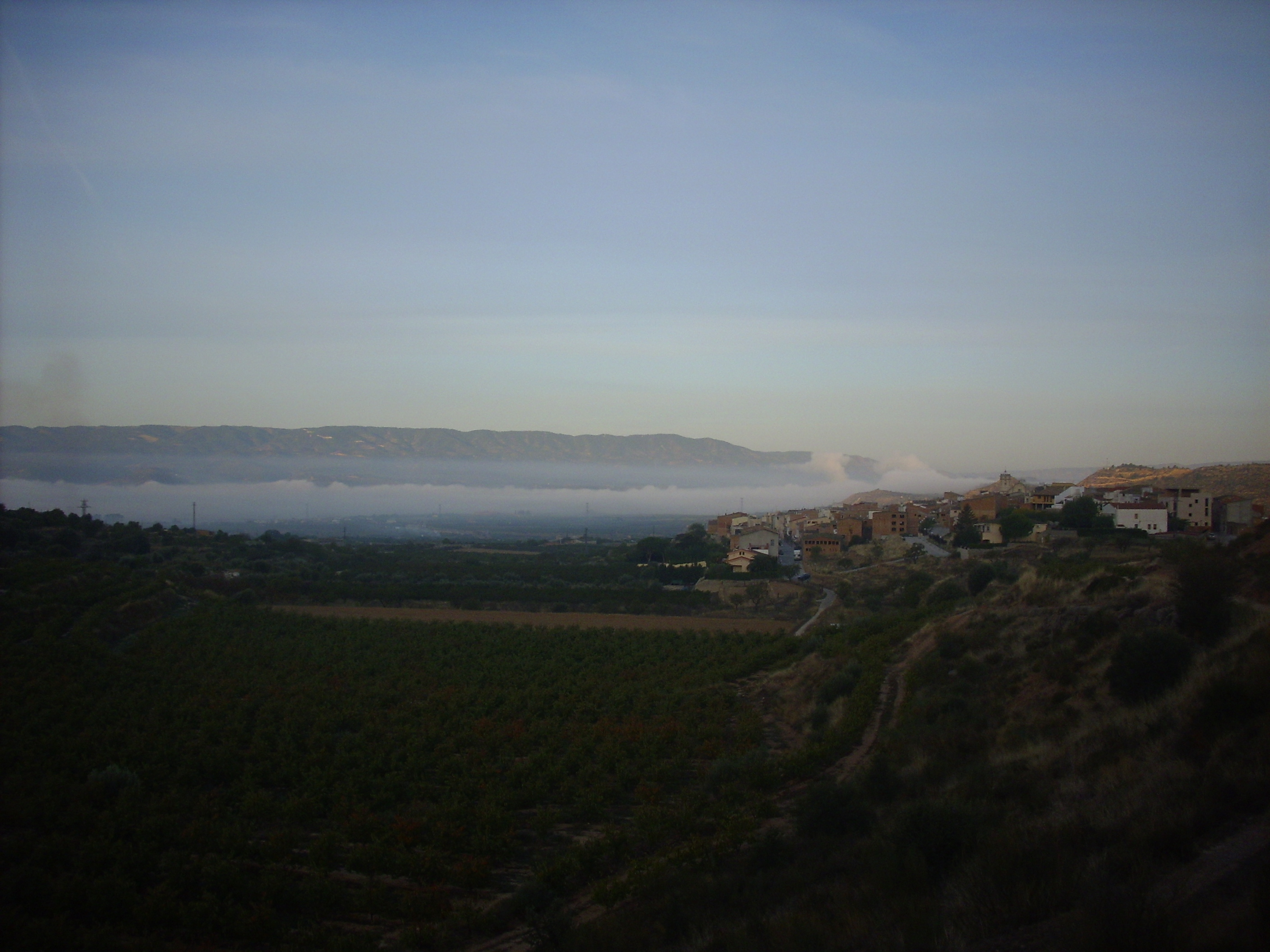

- Flag

- Location in the Province of Tarragona Location in Catalonia Location in Spain
- Coordinates: 41°11′36″N 0°37′36″E
- Country: Spain
- Community: Catalonia
- Province: Tarragona
- Comarca: Ribera d'Ebre

Government
  - mayor: Joan Juncà Cubells (2015)

Area
  - Total: 27.9 km^{2} (10.8 sq mi)
- Elevation: 164 m (538 ft)

Population (2025-01-01)
  - Total: 641
  - Density: 23.0/km^{2} (59.5/sq mi)
- Demonym(s): Torredà, torredana
- Postal code: 43792
- Website: torredelespanyol.cat

La Torre de l'Espanyol (Catalan pronunciation: [la ˈtore ðe laspaˈɲɔl]) is a municipality in the comarca of Ribera d'Ebre, Tarragona Province, Catalonia, Spain. It has a population of 641 (register office, 2025).

Its name originated in the donation of a municipal charter to a person named Espanyol or Espaniol, a name of Occitan origin, in 1175.

== Bibliography ==
- Panareda Clopés, Josep Maria; Rios Calvet, Jaume; Rabella Vives, Josep Maria (1989). Guia de Catalunya, Barcelona: Caixa de Catalunya. ISBN 84-87135-01-3 (Spanish). ISBN 84-87135-02-1 (Catalan).
