= Begijnendijk =

- Municipality
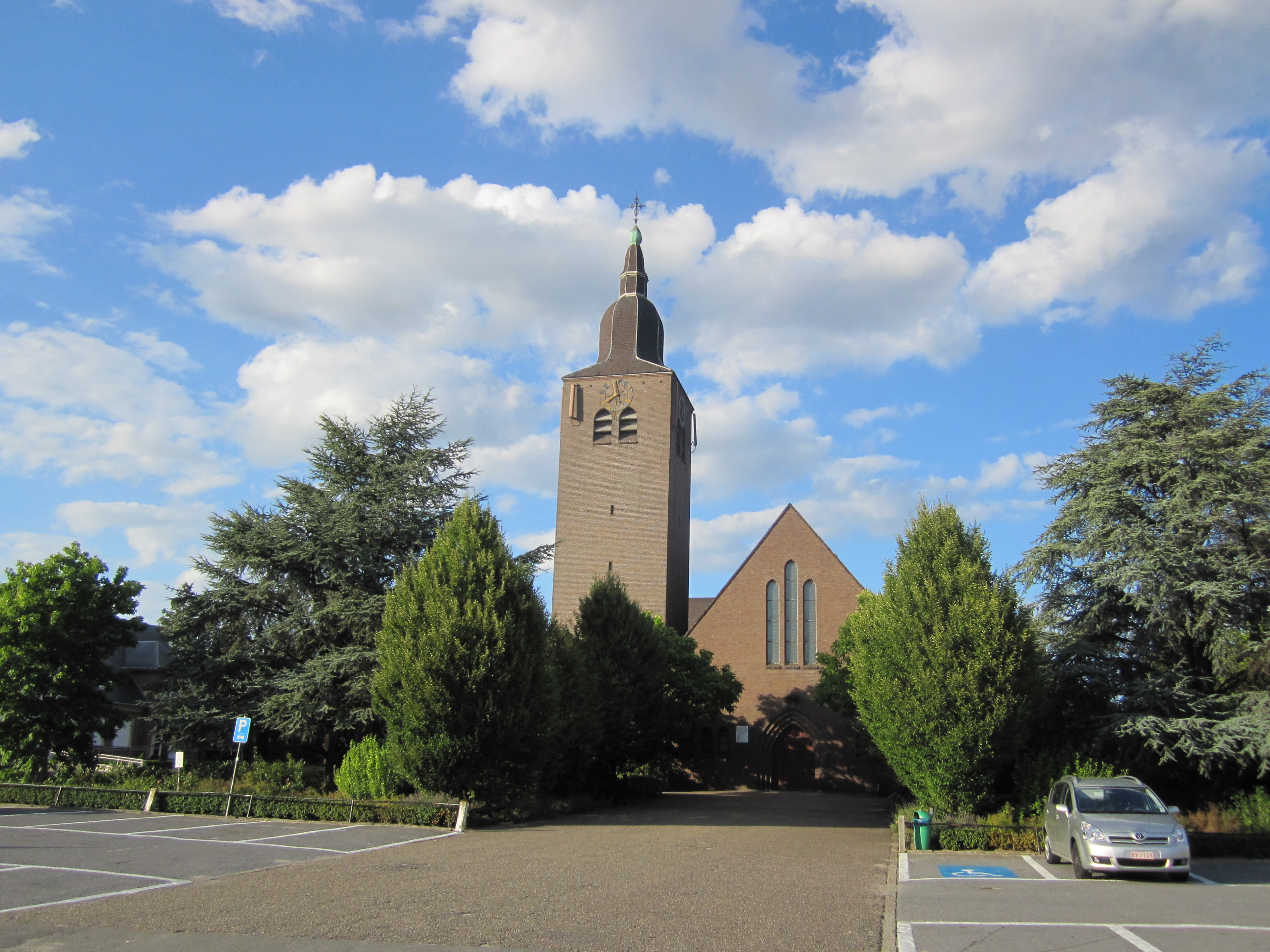

- Flag Coat of arms

- Begijnendijk in the Province of Flemish Brabant
- Interactive map of Begijnendijk
- Location in Belgium
- Coordinates: 51°01′N 04°47′E
- Country: Belgium
- Community: Flemish Community
- Region: Flemish Region
- Province: Flemish Brabant
- Arrondissement: Leuven

Government
  - Mayor: Bert Ceulemans (Samen)
  - Governing parties: Samen, N-VA, S.A.F.E, Leef

Area
  - Total: 17.66 km^{2} (6.82 sq mi)

Population (2018-01-01)
  - Total: 10,053
  - Density: 569.3/km^{2} (1,474/sq mi)
- Postal codes: 3130
- NIS code: 24007
- Area codes: 016 - 015
- Website: www.begijnendijk.be

Begijnendijk (Dutch pronunciation: [bəˈɣɛinə(n)ˌdɛik]) is a municipality located in the Belgian province of Flemish Brabant. The municipality comprises the towns of Begijnendijk proper and Betekom. On January 1, 2006, Begijnendijk had a total population of 9,400. The total area is 17.62 km² which gives a population density of 534 inhabitants per km². The official spoken language is Dutch.

On the 25th of July 2019, the hottest ever recorded in Belgium was recorded in Begijnendijk, the town recording a temperature of 41.8 °C (107.2 °F), beating the temperature of 40.2 °C (104.4 °F) recorded in Angleur, recorded just the previous day.
