= Riba-roja d'Ebre =

- Municipality
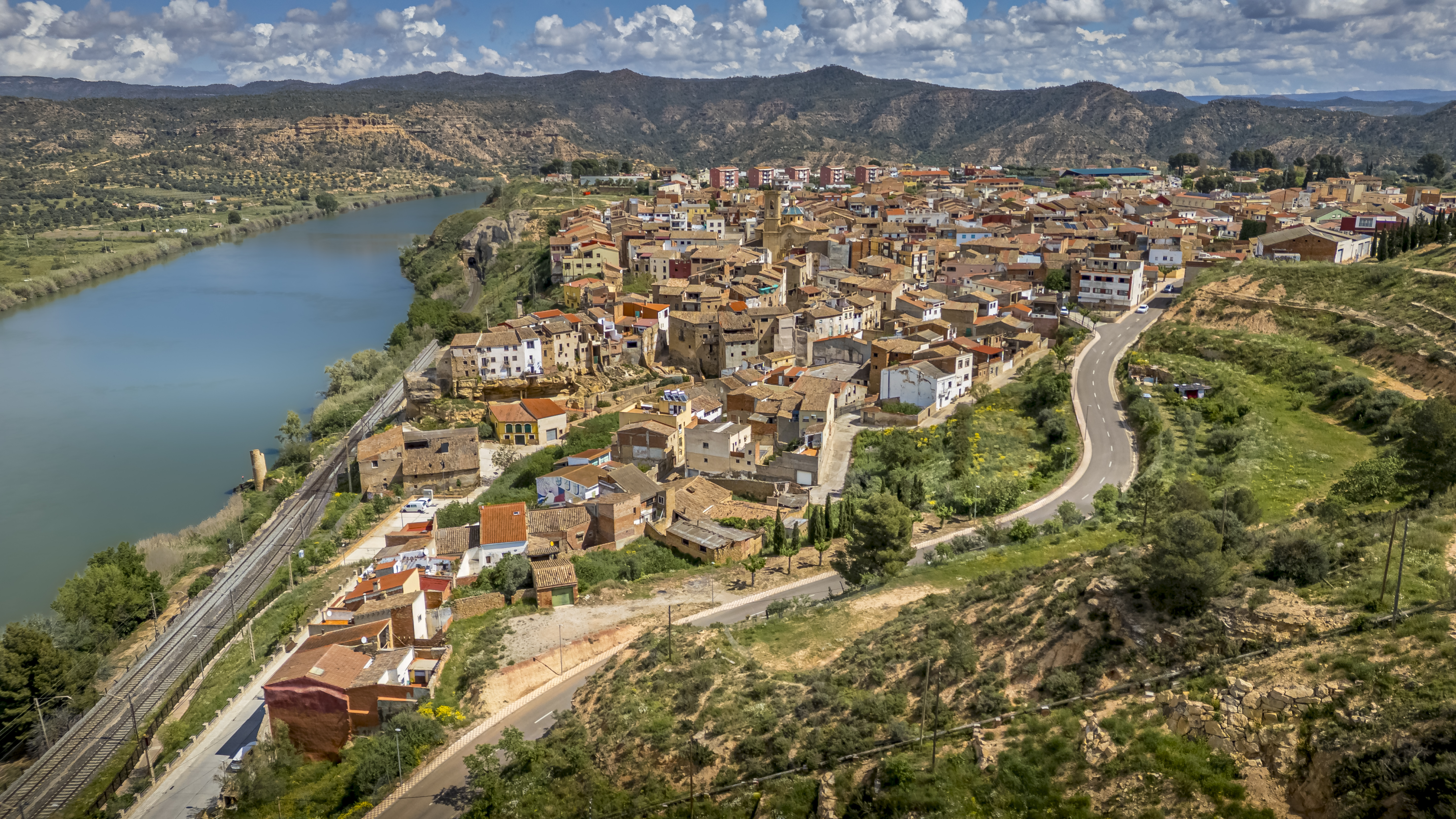
- Aerial view of Riba-roja d'Ebre

- Flag Coat of arms

- Location in Catalonia
- Coordinates: 41°15′08″N 0°29′20″E
- Country: Spain
- Community: Catalonia
- Province: Tarragona
- Comarca: Ribera d'Ebre

Government
  - Mayor: Antonio Suarez Franquet (2015)

Area
  - Total: 99.1 km^{2} (38.3 sq mi)
- Elevation: 76 m (249 ft)

Population (2025-01-01)
  - Total: 1,132
  - Density: 11.4/km^{2} (29.6/sq mi)
- Demonym: Riba-rojà
- Postal code: 43790
- Website: riba-roja.cat

Riba-roja d'Ebre (Catalan pronunciation: [ˌriβaˈrɔjʒa ˈðeβɾe]) is a municipality in the comarca of the Ribera d'Ebre in southern Catalonia, Spain. It has a population of 1,132 (register office, 2025).

It is the site of a large hydroelectric power station, on the Ebro river. The whole area is mountainous.

== See also ==
- Puntal dels Escambrons

== Bibliography ==
- Panareda Clopés, Josep Maria; Rios Calvet, Jaume; Rabella Vives, Josep Maria (1989). Guia de Catalunya, Barcelona: Caixa de Catalunya. ISBN 84-87135-01-3 (Spanish). ISBN 84-87135-02-1 (Catalan).
