= Ascó Nuclear Power Plant =

Nuclear power plant in Catalonia, Spain

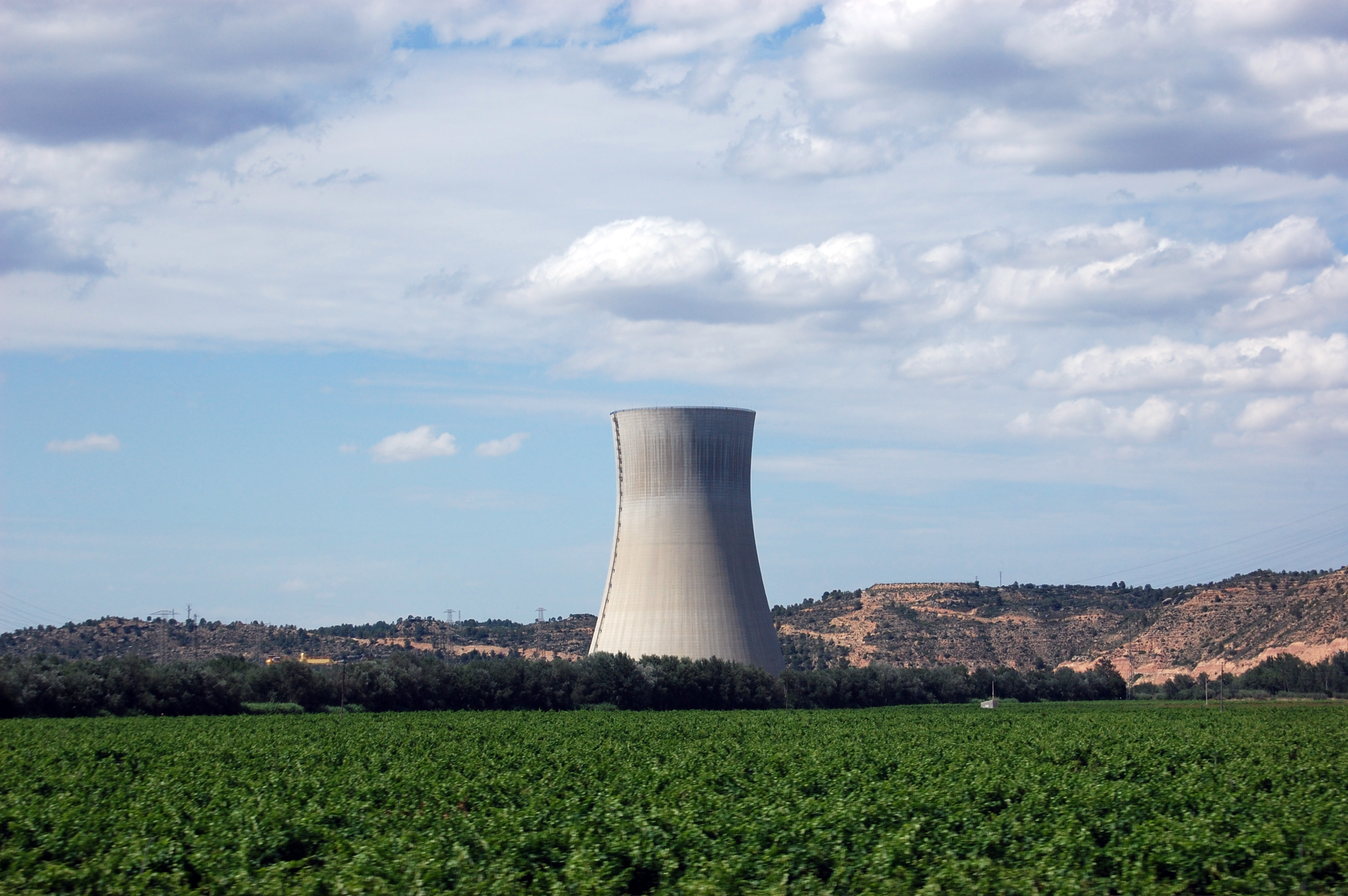
- View of the cooling tower of the Ascó nuclear power plant
- Official name: Central nuclear de Ascó
- Country: Spain
- Coordinates: 41°12′0″N 0°34′10″E
- Status: Operational
- Construction began: 1971
- Commission date: December 10, 1984
- Owner: Endesa
- Operator: Asociación Nuclear Ascó-Vandellòs (ANAV) A.I.E. (ENDESA/ID)

Power generation
- Units operational: 2 totaling 2060 MW
- Nameplate capacity: 1,988 MW
- Annual net output: 15,474 GW·h

External links
- Commons: Related media on Commons

Ascó Nuclear Power Plant (Catalan: Central Nuclear d'Ascó, Spanish: Central Nuclear de Ascó) is a nuclear power station located in Ascó, Catalonia, in Spain.

It consists of two PWRs of 933 and 943 MWe.

== 2007 spill ==
An INES level 2 incident occurred in November 2007 at the Unit 1 reactor. The Spanish Nuclear Safety Council (CSN) was not advised of it until April 4. Although the leak happened in November, particles were not detected outdoors until March 2008. CSN initially estimated that total radioactivity detected was about 235,000 becquerels. The CSN later estimated that a maximum of 84.95 megabecquerels, or 2.3 millicuries, of radioactivity were spilled. CSN announced it was changing the classification of the leak from Level 1 to Level 2 because of "inadequate control of radioactive material and of providing incomplete and deficient information to the controlling body", although the dose "remains very insignificant for the population in the vicinity of the plant" and for workers "in terms of dose, [was] below the legal limits". An investigation was opened and the director of the plant was fired.

== See also ==
- Nuclear power in Spain
