= Ribera d'Ebre =

Coordinates: 41°05′N 0°38′E

- Comarca
- Coat of arms

- Country: Spain
- Autonomous community: Catalonia
- Region: Terres de l'Ebre
- Province: Tarragona
- Capital: Móra d'Ebre
- Municipalities: List: Ascó, Benissanet, Flix, Garcia, Ginestar, Miravet, Móra d'Ebre, Móra la Nova, La Palma d'Ebre, Rasquera, Riba-roja d'Ebre, Tivissa, La Torre de l'Espanyol, Vinebre

Government
  - Body: Ribera d'Ebre Comarcal Council
  - President: Francesc Barbero (ERC)

Area
  - Total: 827.1 km^{2} (319.3 sq mi)

Population (2014)
  - Total: 22,925
  - Density: 27.72/km^{2} (71.79/sq mi)
- Demonym
- Time zone: UTC+1 (CET)
  - Summer (DST): UTC+2 (CEST)
- Largest municipality: Móra d'Ebre
- Website: Official website

Ribera d'Ebre (Western Catalan: [riˈβeɾa ˈðeβɾe]) is a comarca (county) in Catalonia, Spain. It extends to both sides of the Ebre river between the reservoir of Riba-roja and Miravet. It belongs to the Terres de l'Ebre region and its capital is Móra d'Ebre.

== Municipalities ==
Municipality	Population (2014)	Area km^{2}
Ascó	1,654	73.6
Benissanet	1,247	23.1
Flix	3,795	116.9
Garcia	559	52.4
Ginestar	819	15.8
Miravet	774	32.3
Móra d'Ebre	5,578	45.1
Móra la Nova	3,190	15.9
La Palma d'Ebre	371	37.9
Rasquera	858	51.3
Riba-roja d'Ebre	1,195	99.1
Tivissa	1,760	209.4
La Torre de l'Espanyol	676	27.9
Vinebre	449	26.4
• Total: 14	22,925	827.1
