= Flix, Spain =

Flix
- Municipality
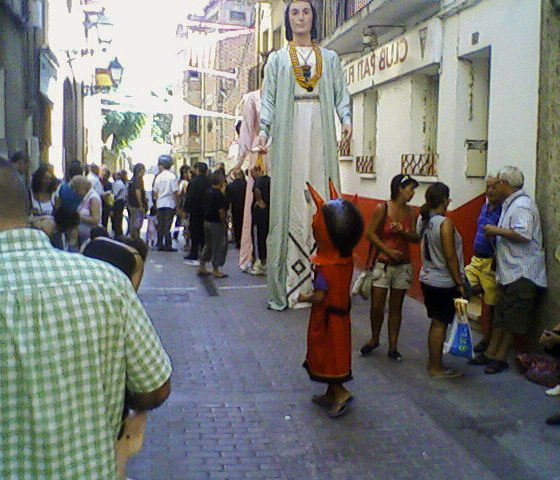

- Flag Coat of arms

- Location in Catalonia
- Coordinates: 41.234°N 0.556°E
- Country: Spain
- Community: Catalonia
- Province: Tarragona
- Comarca: Ribera d'Ebre

Government
  - Mayor: Marc Mur Bages (2015)

Area
  - Total: 116.9 km^{2} (45.1 sq mi)
- Elevation: 48 m (157 ft)

Population (2025-01-01)
  - Total: 3,340
  - Density: 28.6/km^{2} (74.0/sq mi)
- Demonym: Flixenc
- Website: flix.cat

Flix (Catalan pronunciation: [ˈfliʃ]) is a town in the comarca of Ribera d'Ebre, Catalonia, Spain. Situated on a promontory by the Ebro river, the town occupied an important strategic position. Situated on the Madrid–Barcelona railway line, it expanded in the early twentieth century with the construction of a hydroelectric power station in 1948 and a large chemical plant, Electroquímica de Flix.

One of the main tourist attractions is fishing in the horseshoe-shaped bend in the river. Every year there is a large international fishing competition in Flix.

== History ==
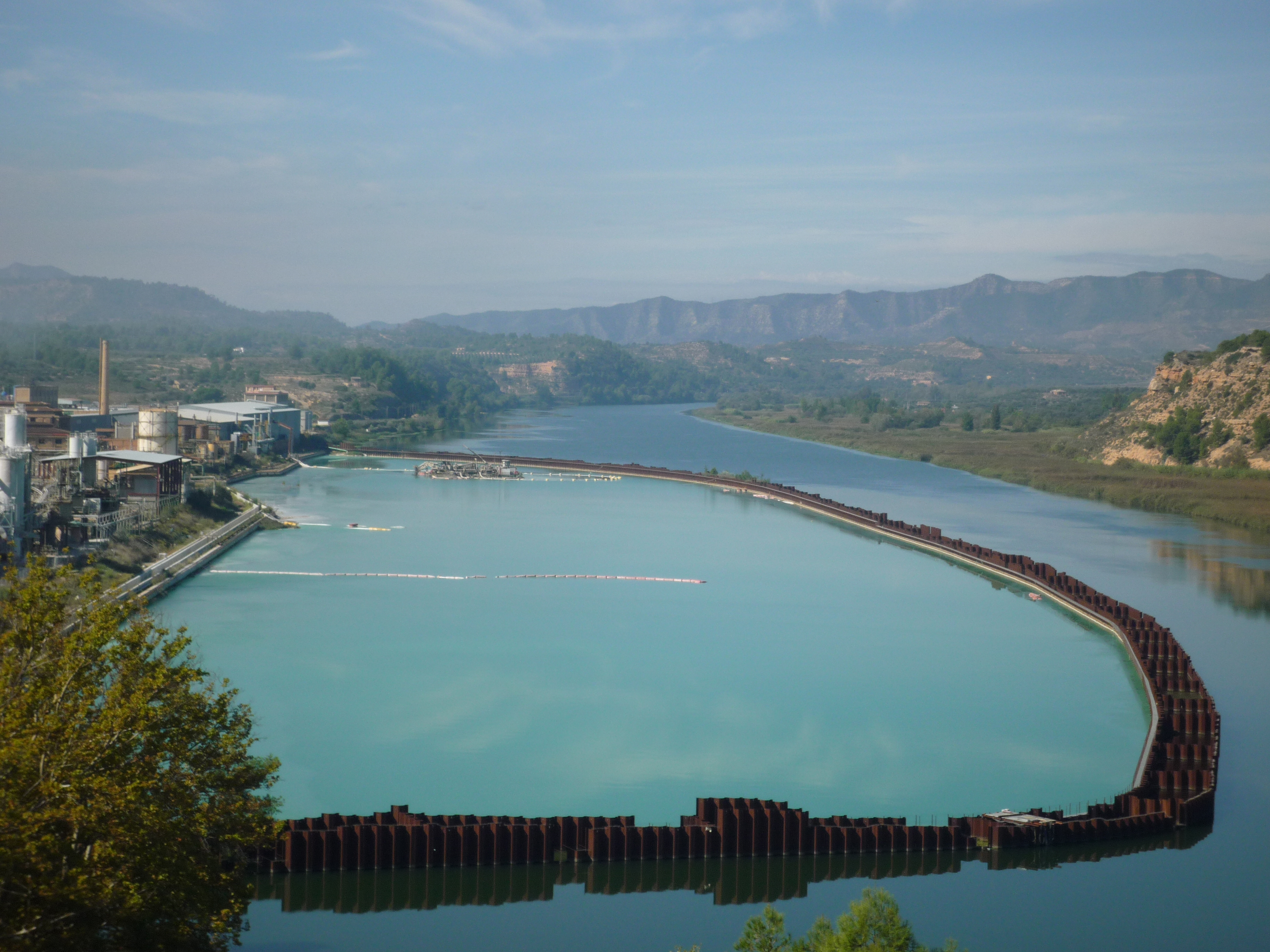
The Flix reservoir and the controversial chemical plant

Flix was the site of a battle in the Spanish Civil War in 1938. The Battle of the Iron Bridge was fought between the International Brigades and the Fascists as part of the Battle of the Ebro. The operation was initially a success for the republicans with the construction of the iron bridge nearly complete by the 3rd Division. However at the end they had lost 3,000 soldiers and the battle. Today there is a memorial to this battle at Flix.

In 2005, the existence of a vast polluted area on the shores of the Flix Reservoir was disclosed. The environmental disaster involving large quantities of toxic waste was caused by the Ercros chemical factory, located by the shore of the artificial lake. Following this disclosure, an ambitious plan to clean up the area was drawn. This plan involves the building of containment barriers and the removal and treatment of the hazardous chemical waste.

== Demographics ==
It has a population of 3,340 (register office, 2025). The population of Flix has grown since 1900 and peaked in the 1980s.

| 1900 | 1930 | 1950 | 1970 | 1986 | 2008 |
|---|---|---|---|---|---|
| 2516 | 3374 | 4272 | 5116 | 5003 | 4054 |
