= 226th Mixed Brigade (Spain) =

226th Mixed Brigade 226.ª Brigada Mixta
- Flag of the 42nd Division, Spanish Popular Army
- Active: 1937–1939
- Country: Spain
- Branch: Spanish Republican Army
- Type: Mixed Brigade
- Role: Home Defence
- Size: Four battalions: The 901, 902, 903 and 904
- Part of: 42nd Division (1938 - 1939)
- Garrison/HQ: La Pobla de Massaluca
- Engagements: Spanish Civil War

Commanders
- Notable commanders: Antonio Ortiz Roldán; José de la Fuente Álvarez

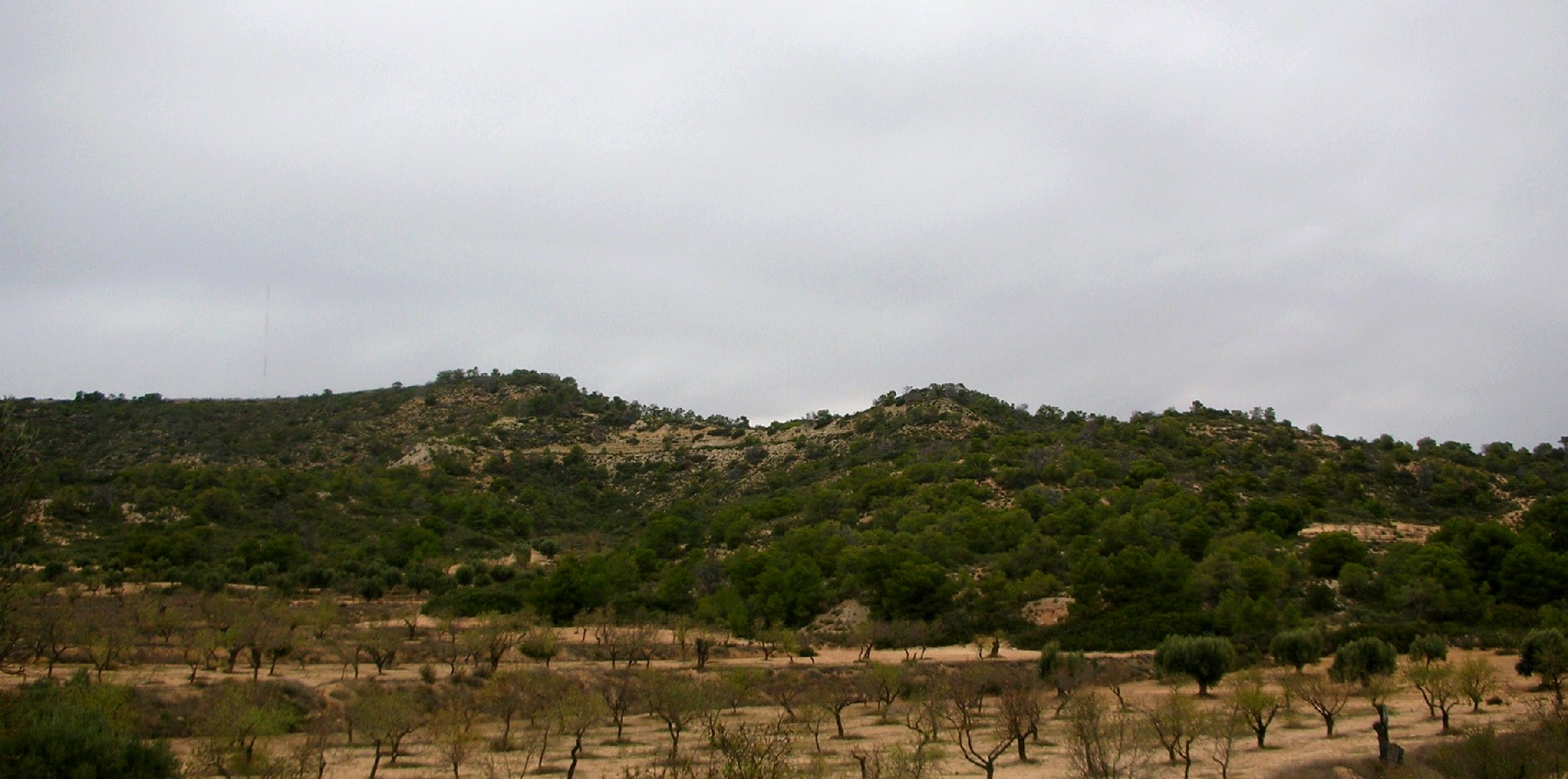
View of the bleak Auts Hills where a great number of the men of the 226th MB perished.

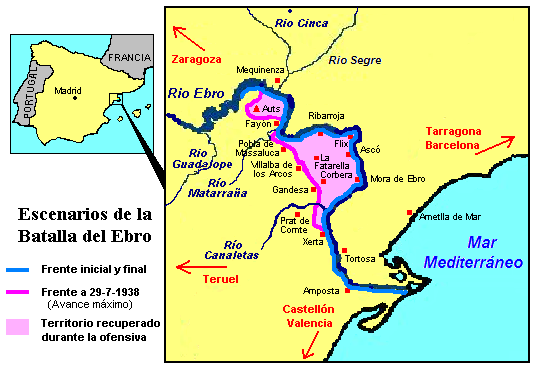
Map of the Battle of the Ebro and location of the Auts

The 226th Mixed Brigade (Spanish: 226.ª Brigada Mixta), was a mixed brigade of the Spanish Republican Army in the Spanish Civil War. Part of its forces had belonged to the former Bautista Garcet Battalion, which had distinguished itself in the combats of the Córdoba offensive at the beginning of the Civil War. Its formation began in August 1937 in Catalonia, but it was delayed for a long time, the brigade not becoming fully operational until 1938. It had four battalions, the 901, 902, 903 and 904.

== History ==
Following a long delay, the 226th Mixed Brigade was finally established on 22 April 1938 and placed under the 42nd Division of the XV Army Corps, at the time part of the Agrupación Autónoma del Ebro (A.A.E.). The command of the unit was assigned to Militia Major Antonio Ortiz Roldán. The political commissar was José Carmona Requena.

=== The bloodbath at the Auts ===
At the onset of the Battle of the Ebro on 25 July 1938 two of the brigade's battalions crossed the Ebro River 2 km to the east of Mequinensa —being one of the first units to cross the river, following which the remainder of the brigade joined them arriving finally to the area of Gilabert after heavy combats. The brigade continued battling the rebel faction between Fayón and Mequinensa, especially at the Fayón-Mequinensa-Fabara road junction, finally being able to occupy the Auts, a semi-arid hilly area east of a bend on the Ebro River. Located at the northern end in the pocket formed on the right bank of the Ebro between Mequinensa and Amposta, the occupation of the Auts was hailed as a strategic success. However, while at the Auts the unit suffered intense aerial bombardment on 29 July and it came under heavy artillery fire between the 4 and 5 August, being prevented from advancing eastwards to capture the towns of Fayón and Mequinensa. Finally the trapped and much battered brigade withdrew from the Auts and crossed back the Ebro river on 6 August, after having suffered a great number of casualties. Two of the battalions of the 226th Mixed Brigade distinguished themselves in the bloody combats of the Auts Hills, the First Battalion (901), under Major Jaramillo, and the Fourth Battalion (904) under a Major nicknamed "Dinamita" (Dynamite).

After covering some of the many casualties the brigade returned to the bridgehead in order to give a much-needed reinforcement to the 45th Division on 20 September, moving to Hill 496 of the Serra de Cavalls. Later it was relocated to the defence of Miravet town, which was lost to enemy forces on 4 November. Together with the also much-battered 227th Mixed Brigade it arrived to Benissanet on 5 November and camped at Mount Picossa by Móra d'Ebre on 7 November. On 12 November the brigade made its last stand of resistance against the rebels at Ascó, but it finally had to withdraw in the face of the vehemence and strength of the enemy onslaught.

=== Withdrawal and extinction of the brigade ===
After the Battle of the Ebro ended badly for the Republican forces the 226th Mixed Brigade was concentrated in La Granadella under the command of Militia Major José de la Fuente Álvarez. When the Catalonia Offensive began, the brigade withdrew to the Serra de Prades. On 5 January 1939 it was reported to be defending the roads leading to Vinaixa. By 13 January it was at the Coll de Prenafeta and Coll de Cabra mountain passes. On 14 January it reached Alcover and on 15 the Gaià River line.

While retreating northwards the brigade offered some resistance at Vilafranca del Penedès. On 25 January in the evening the remainder of the 226th Mixed Brigade gathered at the Tibidabo Mountain over Barcelona, but all new recruits disappeared the following morning as the fall of the city was imminent.

While withdrawing towards France on 7 February the brigade was able to reunite with some disperse troops in the banks of the Fluvià River, retreating further northwards to the line of the Muga River while searching for the protection of natural obstacles in the face of the relentless enemy advance. Finally, on 9 February, what remained of the defeated and exhausted 226th Mixed Brigade crossed the French border at Portbou.

== See also ==
- Spanish Civil War, 1938–39
- Mixed Brigades
- Battle of the Ebro
