= 227th Mixed Brigade (Spain) =

227th Mixed Brigade 227.ª Brigada Mixta
- Flag of the 42nd Division, Spanish Popular Army
- Active: 22 April 1938 – 9 February 1939
- Country: Spain
- Branch: Spanish Republican Army
- Type: Mixed Brigade
- Role: Home Defence
- Size: Four battalions: The 905, 906, 907 and 908
- Part of: 42nd Division (1938 - 1939)
- Garrison/HQ: La Pobla de Massaluca
- Engagements: Spanish Civil War

Commanders
- Notable commanders: Tomás Guerrero Ortega

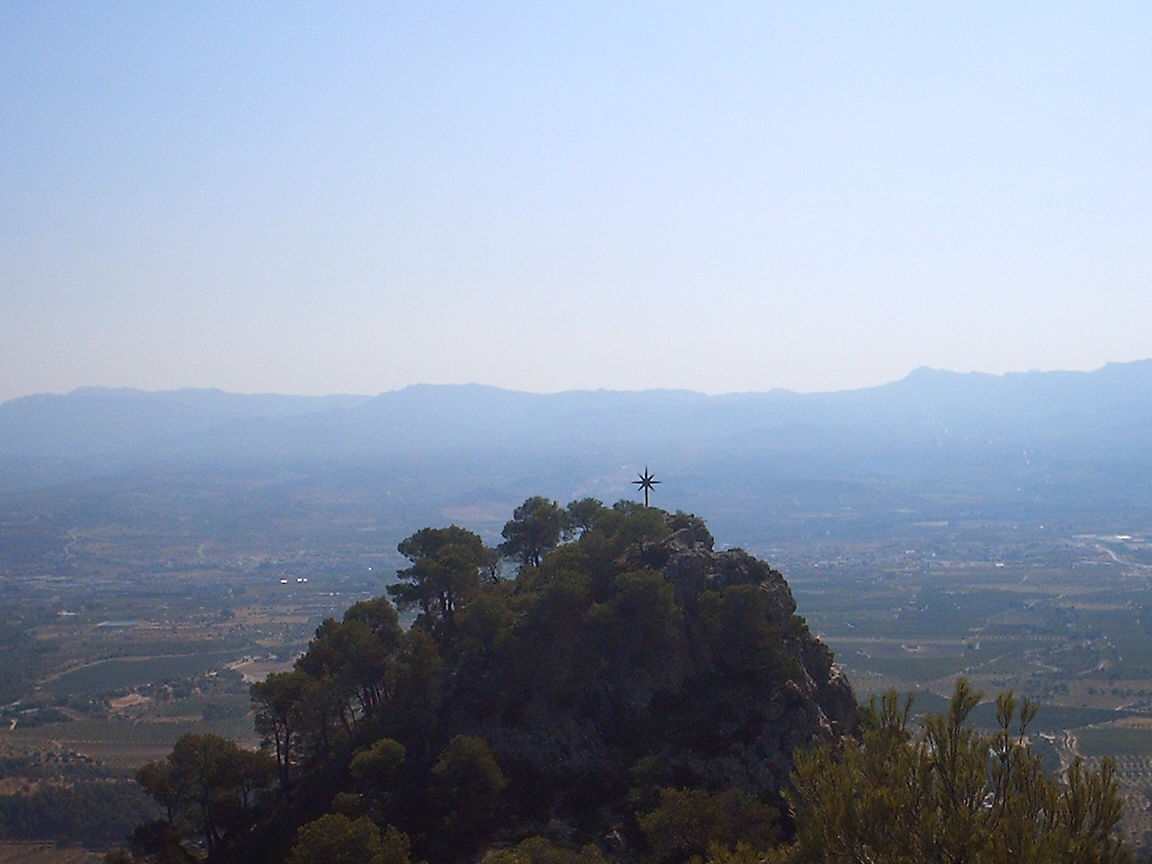
View of Mount Picossa where the 227th MB camped during the northbound withdrawal that followed the bloodbath of the Battle of the Ebro

The 227th Mixed Brigade (Spanish: 227.ª Brigada Mixta), was a mixed brigade of the Spanish Republican Army in the Spanish Civil War. It was formed in the spring of 1938 in Catalonia and had four battalions, the 905, 906, 907 and 908.

== History ==
The 227th Mixed Brigade was established on 22 April 1938 and placed under the 42nd Division of the XV Army Corps, at the time part of the Agrupación Autónoma del Ebro (A.A.E.). The command of the unit was assigned to Militia Lieutenant Tomás Guerrero Ortega. The Chief of Staff leader was Tomás Sánchez Lorda and the political commissar was Lorenzo Arcones Grande.

=== Battle of the Ebro ===
On 25 July 1938 the 227th Mixed Brigade was camped in Almatret and the following day it crossed the Ebro River as part of one of the operations that marked the beginning of the Battle of the Ebro. Its main efforts were directed at recapturing Fayón from the rebel faction, but it was not able to achieve is aim. After lingering for two weeks in the bridgehead area it reached the Auts on 5 August, having to cross back the Ebro on 7 August.

Since it had suffered grievous losses, the 227th Mixed Brigade was moved to La Pobla de Massaluca in order to be reorganized and on 14 September it crossed the Ebro again in order to relieve the forces of the 3rd Division in the Vilalba-Corbera-Vértice Gaeta triangle. On 22 September it replaced units of the 45th Division in the Coll del Coso sector, where it remained until it was replaced by the 44th Division on 6 October.

Owing to the steady and relentless advances of the rebels the brigade returned to first-line combat, defending Miravet on 4 November while initiating the withdrawal along the right bank of the Ebro. It arrived to Benissanet on 5 November and camped at Mount Picossa by Móra d'Ebre on 7 November. Finally it reached Ascó on 12 November where, after a great number of casualties, it had to abandon the bridgehead.

=== Catalonia Offensive and extinction of the brigade ===
At the beginning of the Catalonia Offensive the 227th Mixed Brigade was in La Granadella, under the command of Major Bermejo and commissar Modesto Castrillo, for Major Guerrero was missing in action. On 5 January the brigade was in full withdrawal, marching northeastwards to Vinaixa, where it tried unsuccessfully to defend its road junctions. While the rebels advanced in full force, attacking the retreating Republican troops, the 227th Mixed Brigade continued withdrawing across the Serra de Prades, L'Espluga de Francolí, Alcover and La Selva.

After reaching the Gaià River line, the brigade continued fleeing before the enemy advance. It reached the Tibidabo mountain shortly before the Fall of Barcelona on 25 January. By then the 227th Mixed Brigade had been reduced to a handful of ill-equipped, hungry and demoralized volunteers. Nevertheless, they continued to fight while slowly withdrawing northwards, until they reached the border town of Portbou and crossed the mountains into France on 9 February.

== See also ==
- Spanish Civil War, 1938–39
- Mixed Brigades
- Battle of the Ebro
