= 226th Division =

226th Division may refer to:

- 226th Infantry Division (Wehrmacht), Germany
- 226th Coastal Division, Italy
- 226th Rifle Division, Soviet Union

== See also ==
- List of military divisions by number
- 226th Brigade (disambiguation)
