= Wound Badge =

German military decoration awarded during World War I and World War II

Wound Badge Verwundetenabzeichen
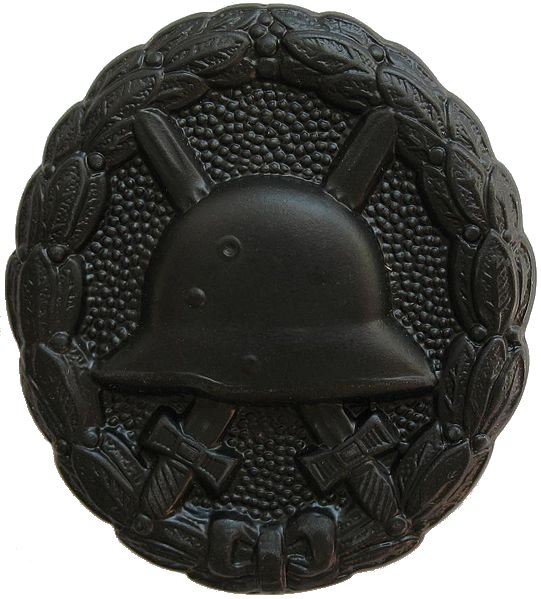
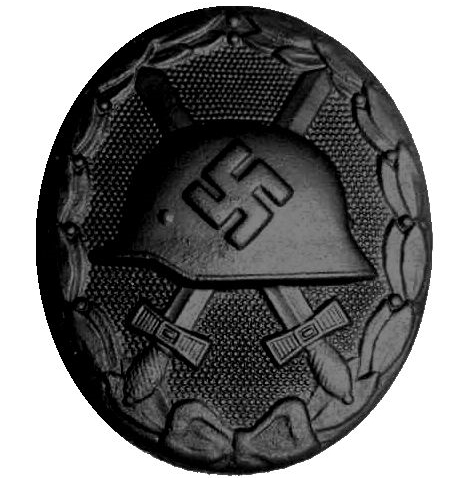
- 1918 & 1945 version in black
- Type: Badge
- Awarded for: wounds whilst on active service
- Presented by: Imperial German Army (WWI) German Army (WWII)
- Eligibility: Military personnel, and, after 1943, civilians as well
- Campaigns: World War I & World War II
- Status: Obsolete
- Established: 3 March 1918
- Final award: 1945

Highlights
- Total: 5 million awarded during World War II

The Wound Badge (German: Verwundetenabzeichen) was a German military decoration first promulgated by Wilhelm II, German Emperor on 3 March 1918, which was first awarded to soldiers of the German Army who were wounded during World War I. Between the world wars, it was awarded to members of the German armed forces who fought on the Nationalist side of the Spanish Civil War, 1938–39, and received combat-related wounds. In September 1939, Adolf Hitler reinstated the award, with the major change being the helmet. The style of the helmet was changed from the one used in World War I to the 1935 pattern helmet. During World War II, it was awarded to members in the Wehrmacht, Schutzstaffel (SS) and the auxiliary service organizations. After March 1943, due to the increasing number of Allied bombings, it was also awarded to civilians wounded in air raids. It was awarded when the wound was the result of enemy hostile action. In 1957, the West German government authorized a denazified (Swastika removed) version of the basic (black, silver, and gold) badges for wear on the Bundeswehr uniform, among other certain Nazi-era wartime awards.

== Manufacture ==
Badges were made of pressed steel, brass, and zinc. There were 24 approved manufacturers of the Wound Badge, which led to some minor variations in their production over time.

== Wearing ==
All versions of the Wound Badge were worn on the lower left breast of the uniform or tunic. The badge was worn below all other awards on the left. It ranked lower than combat badges.

In 1957, a revised version of the Wound Badge was authorised for wear; however, the previous type could still be worn if the swastika was removed (for example, by grinding).

== Classes ==
The badge had three classes:

=== Black ===
3rd class, (representing Iron), for those wounded once or twice by hostile action (including air raids).

At first, the Wound Badge in Black was stamped from sheet brass, painted semi-matte black with a hollow reverse pin back attachment or of solid construction. From 1942, steel was used to make the badges.

=== Silver ===
2nd class for being wounded three or four times.

The Wound Badge in silver was of solid stamped construction and made (before 1942) from silver-plated brass, and (after 1942) from lacquered zinc, and had a solid reverse with either a needle pin or a broad flat pin bar.

=== Gold ===
1st class (which could be awarded posthumously) was awarded for being wounded five or more times. The Wound Badge in gold was of solid stamped construction and a gilded version of the Wound Badge in silver.

The progression could be waived in the event of loss of a limb or eyesight; when such a severe wound occurred, the silver badge was awarded when there was less than three wounds in total. When death or total disability occurred, the gold class was awarded.

== Wound Badge of 20 July 1944 ==
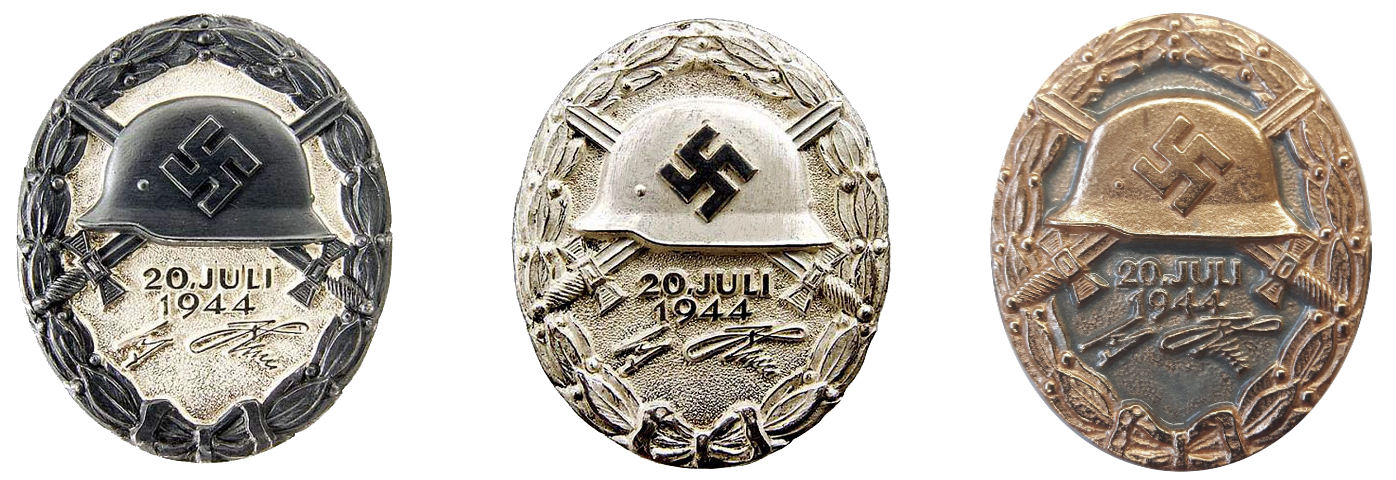
The 20 July version of the Badge shown in black, silver and gold

The 20 July 1944 Wound Badge was only issued to those injured during the failed attempt on Adolf Hitler's life at the Wolf's Lair headquarters in Rastenburg, East Prussia. Twenty-four men were present when the bomb detonated; one officer was killed, and three succumbed to their wounds a short time later. Thereafter, Hitler ordered a special wound badge be awarded commemorating the event, as he believed "fate had intervened" for him.

The 20 July Wound Badge is based on the common Wound Badge, but the helmet is slightly higher and larger; it also bears the date "20 Juli 1944" and a facsimile of Hitler's signature below the helmet and date. The 20 July Wound Badges were also awarded at three grades: black, silver, and gold. Recipients who held regulation Wound Badges were awarded the 20 July Wound Badge in a higher grade. All of these wound badges were made out of solid hallmarked silver by the C. E. Juncker firm.

Unlike the Wound Badge in Black, the 20 July Wound Badge in Black was not all black. Only the helmet and wreath were black; the background was in silver so that the date and facsimile signature could be seen. The 20 July Wound Badge in silver has black highlights on the helmet swastika, the date, and the facsimile signature. The 20 July Wound Badge in gold had a silver background with the helmet and wreath colored gold. Unlike standard Wound Badges, these were two-piece construction.

Hitler presented the survivors with the special wound badge and a unique award document. The first were awarded in a ceremony on 20 August 1944. The four posthumous awards were sent to the recipients' wives. Although Hitler had been injured in the bombing, he did not give one of these badges to himself. Hitler had earned his own Wound Badge (in black) in World War I on 18 May 1918.

The badge replaced the basic 1939 Wound Badge for those persons who were presented the 20 July Badge. This badge was more of a personal gift from Hitler to those involved and was intended to be a one-off souvenir of the event. Recipients of the 20 July wound badge could have their 20 July wound badges upgraded if they earned higher grades of the Wound Badge. Konteradmiral Hans-Erich Voss eventually had the 20 July Wound Badge in all three grades, earning it in black on 20 July 1944, and having it upgraded twice for subsequent wounds.

== See also ==
- Purple Heart
