= 145th Brigade =

145th Brigade may refer to:

- 145th Mixed Brigade, Spain
- 145th Infantry Brigade (United Kingdom)

== See also ==
- 145th Regiment (disambiguation)
