= 226th Brigade =

226th Brigade may refer to:

- 226th Paratroopers Brigade, Israel
- 226th Mixed Brigade (Spain)
- 226th Infantry Brigade (United Kingdom)
- 226th Maneuver Enhancement Brigade, United States
