= 1938–1939 in the Spanish Civil War =

Before this period, the Nationalists had already become dominant, yet the outcome of the war was still not certain. This progressively changed as the Nationalist forces notched up several victories.

The December 1937 – February 1938 Battle of Teruel was an important confrontation between Nationalists and Republicans. The city belonged to the Republicans at the beginning of the battle, but the Nationalists conquered it in January. The Republican government launched an offensive and recovered the city, however, the Nationalists conquered it for good by 22 February. On 14 April 1938, the Nationalists broke through to the Mediterranean Sea during the Aragon Offensive, cutting the government-held portion of Spain in two. The government tried to sue for peace in May, but Francisco Franco demanded unconditional surrender, and the war raged on. The Nationalist army pressed southward from Teruel and along the coast toward the capital of the Republic at Valencia but were halted in heavy fighting along the fortified XYZ Line.

The government now launched an all-out campaign to distract the Nationalists from their attack on Valencia and to reconnect their territory in the Battle of the Ebro, beginning on 24 July and lasting until 26 November. Although the campaign was militarily successful at first, it was fatally undermined by the Franco-British appeasement of Adolf Hitler in the Munich Agreement. The concession of Czechoslovakia destroyed the last vestiges of Republican morale by ending all hope of an anti-Francoist alliance with the great powers. The Republicans were eventually defeated and withdrew in November 1938, another significant step towards the Nationalist's final victory.

The retreat from the Ebro all but determined the outcome of the war. Eight days before the new year, Franco struck back by throwing massive forces into an invasion of Catalonia.

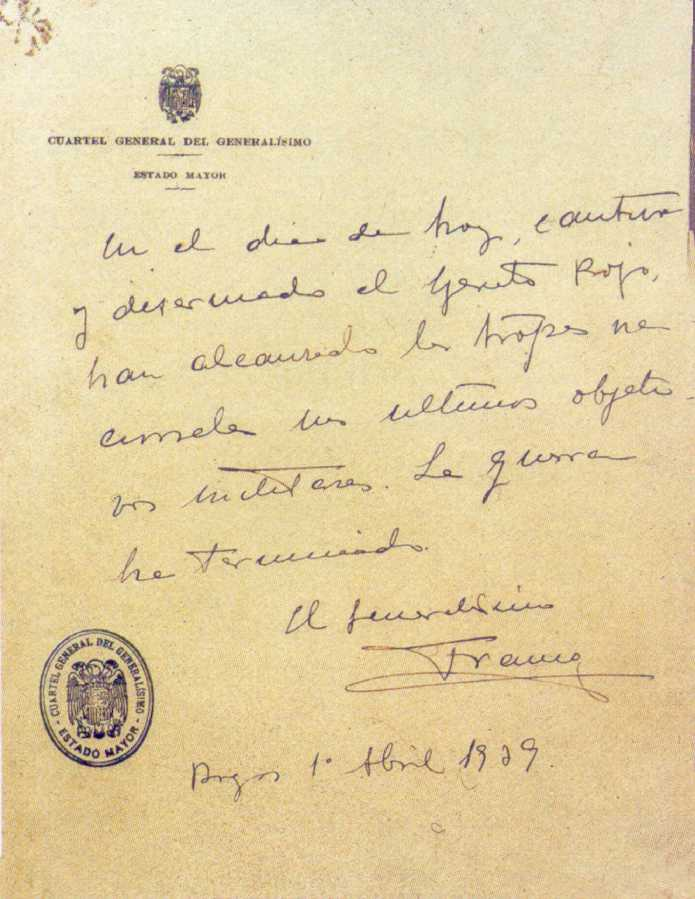
Franco declares the end of the war. However, small pockets of resistance continue to fight.

The Nationalists conquered Catalonia in a whirlwind campaign during the first two months of 1939. Tarragona fell on January 14, followed by Barcelona on 26 January and Girona on 5 February. Five days after the fall of Girona, the last resistance in Catalonia was broken.

On 27 February, the governments of the United Kingdom and France recognized Francoist Spain.

Only Madrid and a few other strongholds remained for the government forces. On 28 March, with the help of pro-Nationalist forces inside the city (the "fifth column" General Emilio Mola had mentioned in propaganda broadcasts in 1936), Madrid fell to the Nationalists. The next day, Valencia, which had held out under the guns of the Nationalists for close to two years, also surrendered. Victory was proclaimed on 1 April, when the last of the Republican forces surrendered.

After the end of the war, there were severe reprisals against the Nationalist's former enemies on the left, when thousands of Republicans were imprisoned and between 10,000 and 28,000 executed. Many other Republicans fled abroad, especially to France and Mexico.

== Detailed chronology: 1938 ==
January 8
Republican troops commanded by Generals Juan Hernández Saravia and Leopoldo Menéndez take the city of Teruel, surrendered by Colonel Domingo Rey d'Harcourt. The harsh winter conditions prevent the timely arrival of troops sent by Franco under the command of Generals Varela and Aranda.
February 20
Republican troops are forced to abandon Teruel and follow the highway to Valencia, under pressure from Moroccan troops commanded by General Yagüe. End of the Battle of Teruel.
March 6
The naval Battle of Cape Palos (the Nationalist heavy cruiser Baleares is sunk by Republican destroyers).
March 13
France reopens its borders for the transit of arms to the Republican zone.
April 5
Socialist minister of defense Indalecio Prieto quits in protest at the level of Soviet influence over the Spanish Republican Army.
April 15
The Nationalists reach the Mediterranean at Vinaròs, dividing the Republican zone in two.
June
France once again closes its borders.
July 5
The international Non-Intervention Committee reaches an agreement regarding the withdrawal of all foreign volunteers from Spain.
July 24
Start of the Battle of the Ebro. Republican forces attempt to divert the Nationalists from attacking Valencia and to diminish the pressure on Catalonia. At first, the Republican troops, commanded by General Modesto, achieve considerable success, but are then limited by superior Nationalist air power. Heavy combat continues into November
September 21
In a speech to the League of Nations Doctor Negrín, head of the Republican government, announces that the International Brigades will be pulled from the combat zones. The withdrawal begins October 4.
October 30
The Nationalists counterattack, forcing Republican troops back across the Ebro.
November 16
End of the Battle of the Ebro.
December 23
The battle for Barcelona begins. A six-pronged Nationalist attack is launched, with separate columns from the Pyrenees to the Ebro. They take Borges Blanques, surround Tarragona and reach the outskirts of Barcelona. The Republican government retreats from Barcelona to Girona, although troops continue to maintain the defense of the city.

== Detailed chronology: 1939 ==
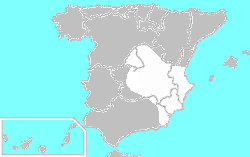
Spain after the conclusion of the Catalonia Offensive.

January 5
The Republican army starts a diversionary offensive in Extremadura, the Valsequillo Offensive.
January 15
France once again allows arms to flow to the Republic.
January 26
Barcelona falls to the Nationalists.
February 4
The Valsequillo Offensive ends.
February 7–9
Uprising against the Republic in Menorca. The Nationalist occupied the island.
February 10
End of the Catalonia Offensive. Spain's border with France closed by Franco.
February 13
Franco approved the Ley de Responsablidades Políticas.
February 27
France and Great Britain recognized the Nationalist's government.
March 4–7
Uprising against Negrin's government in Cartagena.
March 5
The Republican Army led by the Colonel Segismundo Casado started a coup against the Negrín's government. Casado established a military junta, the National Defence Council at the time of the rebel Final offensive of the Spanish Civil War.
The remaining Spanish Republican Navy ships (three cruisers, eight destroyers and one submarine) flee to Bizerte where they are interned.
March 6
The Republican government goes into exile in France.
March 7–11
Fight in Madrid between the supporters of the Negrin's government led by the Colonel Luis Barceló and the supporters of Casado
March 12–25
The Consejo de Defensa Nacional, headed by Colonel Casado, tries without success to negotiate with Franco.
March 26–31
Nationalist's final offensive against the Spanish Republic. The Nationalists captured 150,000 Republican soldiers.
March 28
With the virtual disintegration of the Republican army, the Nationalists take Madrid without further fighting.
March 30
The Nationalists occupied Valencia and the Italian troops Alicante.
March 31
The Nationalists occupied Almeria, Murcia and Cartagena.
April 1
Franco announces the end of the war. The United States recognized the Nationalist's government.

== See also ==
- 1936 in the Spanish Civil War
- 1937 in the Spanish Civil War
- Timeline of Spanish history#20th century
- Final offensive of the Spanish Civil War
- La Retirada The exodus of 500,000 Republican forces and civilians to France in early 1939.
- Group of Central Region Armies Grupo de Ejércitos de la Región Central (GERC)
- List of classes of Spanish Nationalist ships of the Spanish Civil War
- List of weapons of the Corpo Truppe Volontarie
- Aviazione Legionaria
- Condor Legion
- List of Spanish Republican military equipment of the Spanish Civil War
