= Fabara =

Fabara Favara de Matarranya
- municipality
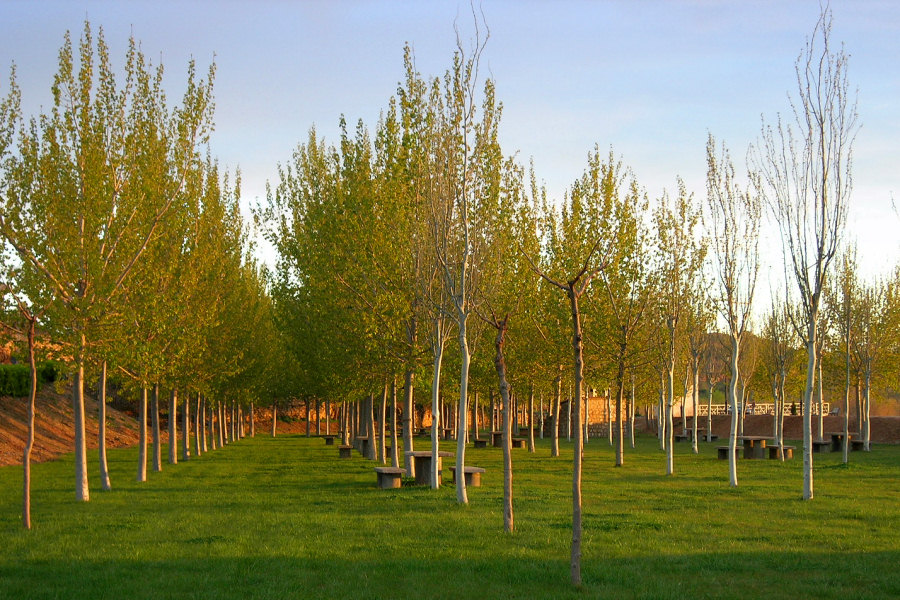

- Flag Coat of arms

- Location of Fabara/Favara de Matarranya within Aragon Location of Fabara/Favara de Matarranya within Spain
- Country: Spain
- Autonomous community: Aragon
- Province: Zaragoza

Area
  - Total: 101 km^{2} (39 sq mi)

Population (2025-01-01)
  - Total: 1,063
  - Density: 10.5/km^{2} (27.3/sq mi)
- Time zone: UTC+1 (CET)
  - Summer (DST): UTC+2 (CEST)
- Website: ayuntamiento-fabara.com

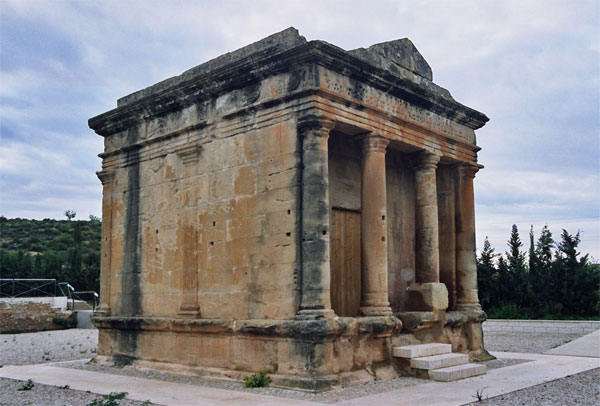
Roman mausoleum

Fabara (Spanish: [faˈβaɾa]) or Favara de Matarranya (Catalan: [faˈβaɾa ðe mataˈraɲa]) is a municipality located in the province of Zaragoza, Aragon, Spain. According to the 2004 census (INE), the municipality has a population of 1,195 inhabitants. This town is located in La Franja, the local dialect is a variant of Catalan.

There is a Roman mausoleum in this town, as well as important archaeological sites close by.

== See also ==
- Bajo Aragón-Caspe/Baix Aragó-Casp
- La Franja
- List of municipalities in Zaragoza
