= Yagüe =

Yagüe is a Spanish surname. It is possibly derived from a name for someone born on St James' Day, from Old Spanish Santi Yague, a common medieval form of Santiago. Notable people with the surname include:

- Albert Yagüe (born 1985), Spanish footballer
- Brigitte Yagüe (born 1981), Spanish taekwondo practitioner
- Juan Yagüe (1891–1952), Spanish army officer during the Spanish Civil War
- Pablo Yagüe (c. 1909–1943), Spanish trade union leader
