= Auts =

Mountains in Aragon, Spain

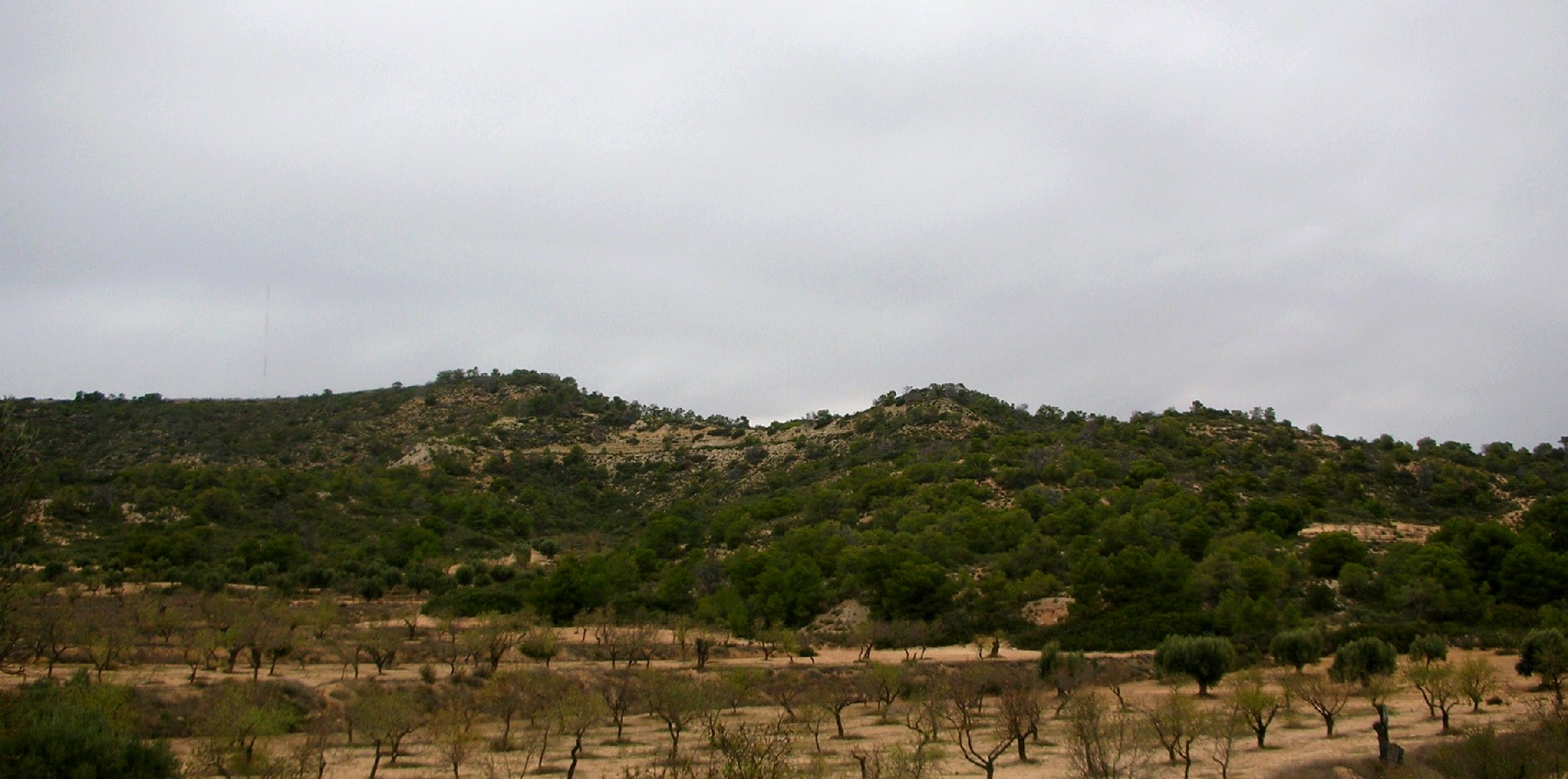

Highest point
- Elevation: 434 m (1,424 ft)
- Listing: List of mountains in Aragon
- Coordinates: 41°19′N 0°17′E

Geography
- Location within Spain
- Location: Bajo Cinca (Aragon)

Geology
- Mountain type: Sedimentary rock

Climbing
- First ascent: Unknown
- Easiest route: Drive from Mequinenza

Auts (Catalan pronunciation: [ˈawts]) is a mountain chain that is located southeast of Mequinenza, close to the Ebro river in the Bajo Cinca comarca, Aragon, Spain. Its maximum elevation is 434 metres.

== History ==
These moderately high, dry mountains were the scenario of one of the most bloody confrontations during the Battle of the Ebro in the Spanish Civil War (1936–39). On 25 July 1938 the 42nd Division of the Spanish Republican Army successfully crossed the river in this area and occupied the Auts area taking positions in the hills. Initially the feat of the Republican troops was hailed as a great victory by the Spanish Republic, eager to see a positive outcome of the Battle of the Ebro effort. But the 226th and 227th mixed brigades of the division were soon surrounded and relentlessly massacred in the Auts by General Franco's rebel faction. After having suffered a great number of casualties the few battered survivors of the division had to cross back the Ebro River. There is a monument to the many soldiers who died in the Auts at the feet of the range near the road leading to Mequinenza.

=== Auts Monument ===
Six decades after the events, on 8 August 1998, the "Quinta del Biberón", a group of survivors inaugurated the monument erected on the hillside of the Alto de los Auts, a key position, the highest and most strongly defended by the Republicans of the Mequinenza-Fayón battle. The monument, designed by Javier Torres, is chaired by two plaques, in Catalan and Spanish, and two helmets on each side. The plaque says: 'To all those who lost, who were all'. The event involved up to 250 "biberones" accompanied by their families. After making a floral offering at the foot of the monument, the veterans recalled the thirst, heat and illness they suffered at those spaces.

== Origin of the name ==
The name "Auts" comes most likely from an ancient Catalan word for "heights", "alts" in modern Catalan. Referring to hills this name appears, for example, in Ramon Llull's following text:

«Los cavaliers veem que fant castells i forces en los auts munts, per tal que si son vensuts ni sobrats en los píans, que fugen en los munts».

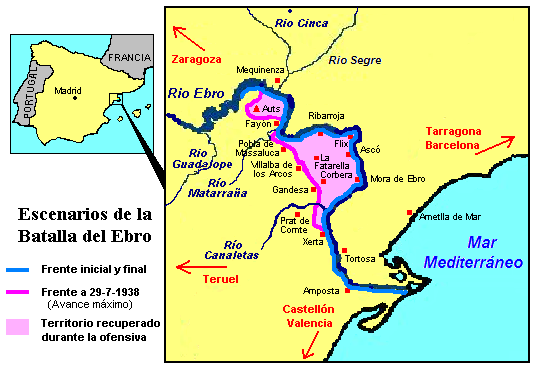
Map of the Battle of the Ebro .

== See also ==
- Battle of the Ebro
- La Franja

== Bibliography ==
- Jaume Aguadé i Sordé, El diari de guerra de Lluís Randé i Inglés; Batalles del Segre i de l’Ebre i camps de concentració (abril 1938 – juliol 1939), El Tinter ISBN 84-9791-082-6
