= Mequinenza =

Mequinenza Mequinenza Mequinensa
- Municipality
- Flag Coat of arms

- Location in Aragon Location in Spain
- Coordinates: 41°22′0″N 0°18′0″E
- Country: Spain
- Community: Aragon
- Province: Zaragoza
- Comarca: Bajo Cinca/Baix Cinca

Area
  - Total: 307.2 km^{2} (118.6 sq mi)
- Elevation: 75 m (246 ft)

Population (2025-01-01)
  - Total: 2,236
  - Density: 7.279/km^{2} (18.85/sq mi)
- Time zone: UTC+1 (CET)
  - Summer (DST): UTC+2 (CEST)
- Postal code: 50170
- Website: mequinensa.com

Mequinenza (Spanish: [mekiˈnenθa]) or Mequinensa (Catalan: [mekiˈnɛnsa]) is a town and municipality of the province of Zaragoza, in the autonomous community of Aragon, Spain. It is located beside the river Segre, close to its confluence with the river Ebro between the Mequinenza Dam and Riba-roja reservoir.

Its reservoir, known also as Mar de Aragón, built between 1957 and 1964, has a capacity of 1,530,000,000 m^{3}.

== History and features ==
Mequinenza is located where the ancient Iberian city of Octogesa once stood, that played an important role in the battle of Ilerda that took place in June 49 BC between the forces of Julius Caesar and the Spanish army of Pompey Magnus. Since 1983 and as part of the research programs of the Museum of Zaragoza and the collaboration with the City Council of Mequinenza three main sites have been excavated by archeologists: Los Castellets, Barranco de la Mina Vallfera and Riols I.

- Los Castellets: a key site for the knowledge of the transition of the peoples of the Late Bronze Age to the Urnfield culture. The site consists of a colony on a stirrup in the river Ebro, surrounded by two towers, a wall and a ditch, next to two necropolis.
- Barranco de la Mina Vallfera: an emergency excavation campaign was carried out on this site, discovering a very important group of necropolis and final Neolithic dating.
- Riols I. In October 1985, the first emergency excavation campaign was carried out, describing a settlement similar to that of Barranco de la Mina Vallfera. The conservation of this deposit allowed to initiate the studies that indicated that it dated from the final period of the Neolithic.

Numerous associated paintings and engravings have been found in Mequinenza, belonging to the Rock art of the Iberian Mediterranean Basin, considered a World Heritage Site by UNESCO in 1998: Barranco de Campells I, Barranco de Campells II, Barranco de La Plana I, Barranco de La Plana II, Camino de la Cova Plana I, Camino de la Cova Plana II, Mas de Patriciel I, Roca de Marta, Sierra de los Rincones I, Valmayor IV, Valmayor V, Val de Caballé, Val de Mamet I, Val de Mamet II and Vallbufandes I.

=== Antiquity and Middle Age ===
In Roman times the old Octogesa was settled and would be located near the actual place of the town. During the decay of the Roman Empire, Octogesa was conquered by the Gothic army and later conquered by the Berber tribe of the Miknasa, which would give its name to the town. It was known in Andalusian times as Miknasa al-Zaytun, or Miknasa of the Olives, a title also given to Meknes, a Moroccan city of the same etymology. It is believed that Miknasa al-Zaytun was settled between the years 714 and 719. During this time it is built a small tower defense. Al-Idrisi, chronicler of the time, describes it like this:

It is small, but it has a strong fortress of strong aspect and it is in the borders of al-Ándalus.

With the Reconquista, the first attempt to besiege Mequinenza in 1133 by Alfonso the Battaler was successful and, although the Almoravids reconquered the town the following year. Mequinenza is definitively won by the Christians on 24 October 1149 by a Catalan-Aragonese army. Mequinenza, after half a century of direct royal jurisdiction, was a manor of the house of the Moncada, together with Aitona and Seròs. These are the ones that built the important Castle of Mequinenza. Although the Christian conquest still stood, the three villages were mostly Muslim. Years later conflicts between Fraga and Mequinenza arise because of their border boundaries. On 6 September 1246, to avoid battles and litigation, Pere de Moncada and his wife Sibila proceeded to muddle these terms.

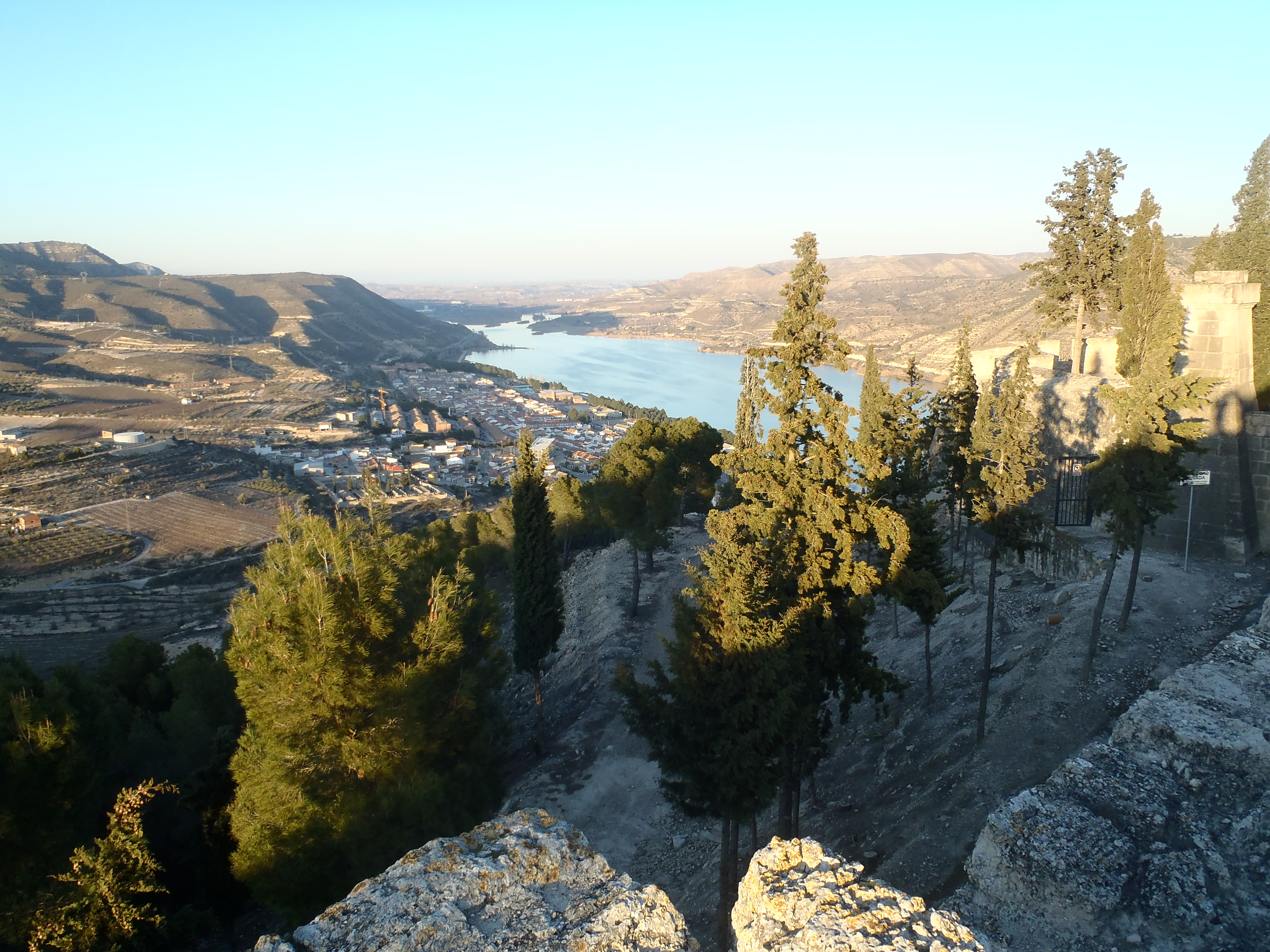
Mequinenza view from the Castle

Mequinenza did not avoid the plague of 1348, which caused many victims on this occasion and also in epidemic outbreaks since 1380. As a result, from 1381 to 1387, the infant Juan el Cazador remains on several occasions in the castle. In 1410, after the death without descendants of Martin of Aragon and during the successive disputes that led to the Commitment of Caspe, the supporters of Count Jaime de Urgel in the kingdom of Aragon organized their parliament in Mequinenza, in opposition to the parliament of Alcañiz loyal to Fernando de Trastámara.

=== Modern and contemporary age ===
Between the 15th and 16th centuries, a time of misery and hunger happens with several revolts due to the oppression of some gentlemen. In the year 1697 Fray Miguel de Salas wrote the book "Vida de Santa Agathoclia, virgin and martyr, patron of Mequinenza". During the reign of Carlos II, silkworm farming industries were developed that would continue active until the arrival of the War of succession in 1705. Different wars such as the Catalan Civil War (1462–1472) and different Spanish internal battles in also devastated the town and the castle during the 16th and 17th centuries.

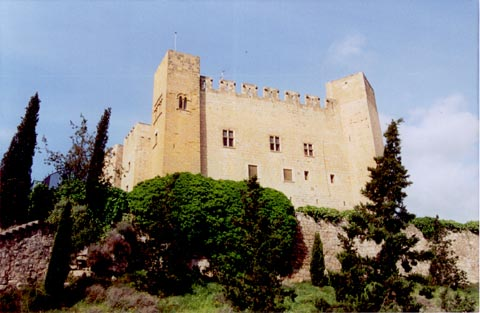
Castle of Mequinenza

In 1810 during the Napoleonic invasion, General Louis-Gabriel Suchet -as Ramon Berenguer IV did in 1149- conquered Mequinenza, Fraga and Lerida. This facilitates the conquest of the whole of the Bajo Cinca and the Segriá regions, and as a result of this figure "Mequinenza" in the Arc de Triomphe of Paris was one of the great victories of Napoleon. In 1812 Mequinenza became part of the French Department of the Bouches of the Ebro. Mequinenza was recovered for the Spaniards by troops of General Copons in 1814 thanks to an audacious stratagem of the adventurer Juan Van Halen. In 1831 the town and the castle already belonged to the Dukes of Medinaceli.

Once again under the rule of the Bourbons, the strategic castle of Mequinenza and its surroundings were transformed and conditioned again to adapt to new forms of warfare with artillery and infantry equipped with rifles. The Duke of Orléans also ordered to expand and strengthen the road parallel to the Ebro river that connected Mequinenza with Tortosa. In the enlightened environment of the mid-18th century in Spain, José Ferrer Beltrán was born in Mequinenza, a priest who stood out for his role as a musician as an organist for the cathedrals of Lérida, Pamplona and Oviedo. He also became a close friend of the Asturian politician Gaspar Melchor de Jovellanos. The old undiscovered city of Octogesa also attracted many adventurers as the French diplomat and writer Jean-François de Bourgoing that evoked the possible link between the Mequinenza town and the Roman Octogesa of Julius Caesar.

At the dawn of the 19th century, the economic situation of Mequinenza had not changed substantially and agriculture continued to be the main economic source. Mudejar irrigation techniques and large treadmills were still used close to the Ebro river. In 1802, Charles IV granted consent for the construction in Mequinenza of a new parish church, designed by the architect José de Yarza in the Neo-Renaissance style. The works began in 1802 and lasted until 1808.

=== Spanish War of Independence and the siege of Mequinenza ===
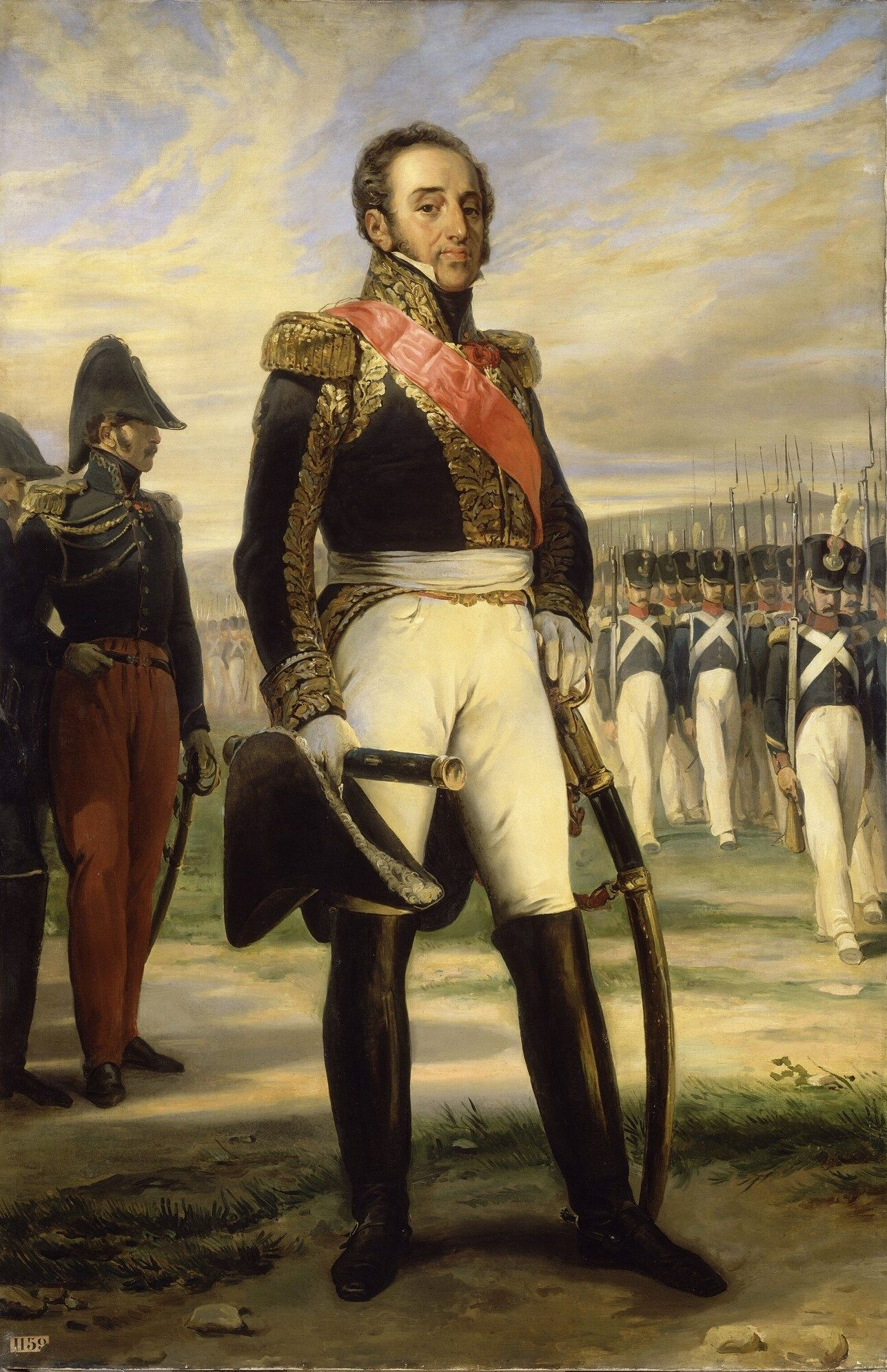
Louis-Gabriel Suchet

During the Spanish War of Independence, within the Napoleonic Wars the siege of Mequinenza began on 15 May 1810. Despite having only a castle with few defenses, the town and its castle were located in a strategic point for the Napoleonic army to ensure the navigation of the Ebro and the use of the town as a supply and transport base for subsequent military operations. The first attack on the population was in mid-March after the capture of Fraga, although population defenders under the command of Colonel Manuel Carbón rejected the attack. After this first failed attempt, the French high command changed its strategy seeking the peaceful surrender of the castle.

Failing this attempt to surrender the square by peaceful route, the French army again opted for the military route. After the capture of Lérida, General Louis-Gabriel Suchet in command of the 3rd Army Corps ordered General Musnier to assault Mequinenza with his division. The siege began on 19 May and days later Musnier's troops were joined by those from the Mont-Marie brigade, stationed on the right bank of the Ebro and those of General Joseph Rogniat, who reinforced the siege with engineers, sappers and miners. The attackers numbered about 16,000 men, four engineer companies and two artillery with 14 pieces. The Spanish defense of the square, at the hands of Colonel Carbón, had a total of 1,200 men. On 2 June, French engineers had already started digging trenches and located artillery pieces to attack the castle while the infantry stormed the town at the same time. The Spanish garrison left the town on the night of 3 June and took refuge in the castle. On the night of 4 to 5 June, the second battalion of the first Vistula regiment erected a square tower armed with artillery. The same night the population is taken and eight pieces of cannon, four hundred rifles, fifteen barrels of gunpowder and four barges. The head of the Polish battalion Chlusowitz and the French sapper captain Foucaud lead the attack.

With the town taken, General Suchet goes to the siege of the castle. On the night of 7 to 8 June, the artillery commanded by Battalion Chief Raffron, assembled three new batteries and the fire of sixteen artillery pieces begins at the start of the day. General Carbon's defenders respond vigorously by destroying three pieces, though French fire continues to dent the defenses. Finally, a part of the main walls succumbs and the projectiles begin to reach the center of the castle. The attack is joined by the French shooters parapeted with bags of sand. On the 8th at 10 o'clock in the morning, the Spanish garrison, after offering great resistance throughout the night, fought back and finally flew the white flag. The garrison gains the honor of parading in front of General Musnier's division and lays down its weapons in front of the glacis of the Mequinenza Castle. The Spanish troops at that time were 500 soldiers of various origins: Navarrese-Aragonese, Catalans, smugglers, Miquelets, adventurers and a regiment commanded by an Englishman named Doyle who held the rank of Commissar General of Aragon. Inside the castle, the French found five mortars, four hundred thousand English-made cartridges, and thirty thousand gunpowder, as well as food for three months.

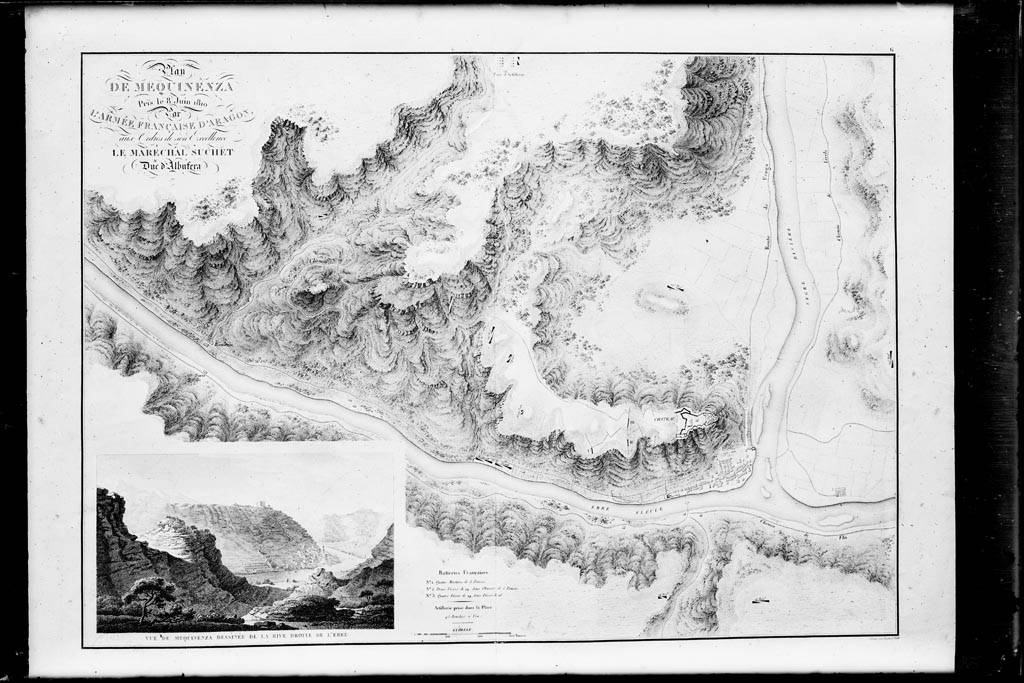
French map of the siege of Mequinenza (1810)

Mequinenza was incorporated into the French department of Bouches-de-l'Èbre. The French Mequinenza would not last long and in 1814 it would be recovered again for the Spanish thanks to the Spanish soldier and adventurer of Flemish origin Juan Van Halen. As a consequence of these military contests, the name "Mequinenza" appears on the Arc de Triomphe in Paris as one of the great Napoleonic victories in Spain.

The British military man and artist Edward Hawke Locker describes the population in 1824 in his work "Views in Spain" after one of his trips around Spain:

The Segre which rises in the Pyrenees at the distance of 120 miles, and traverses some of the richest plains of Cataluña, falls into the Ebro, beneath the walls of Mequinenza, which stands on the confluence of these two rivers, and of the Cinca, which also becomes tributary to the Ebro, near the same spot. Mequinenza is a fortified town of some consequence, though its population does not exceed 1500 souls.

Mequinenza returns to be a place of importance during the Carlist Wars and later in the War of the Matiners. In 1841, the adventurer and businessman Enrico Misley promoted the Ebro Steamer Company with the aim of establishing a transportation service between Zaragoza and Barcelona divided into sections, using coal from the Mequinenza mines as fuel for Steamships. Misley's company ended up failing for political and economic reasons, although it meant a starting point in the concession and exploitation of the first mining demarcations of the Mequinenza coal basin.

=== Spanish Civil War and the Battle of the Ebro in Mequinenza ===
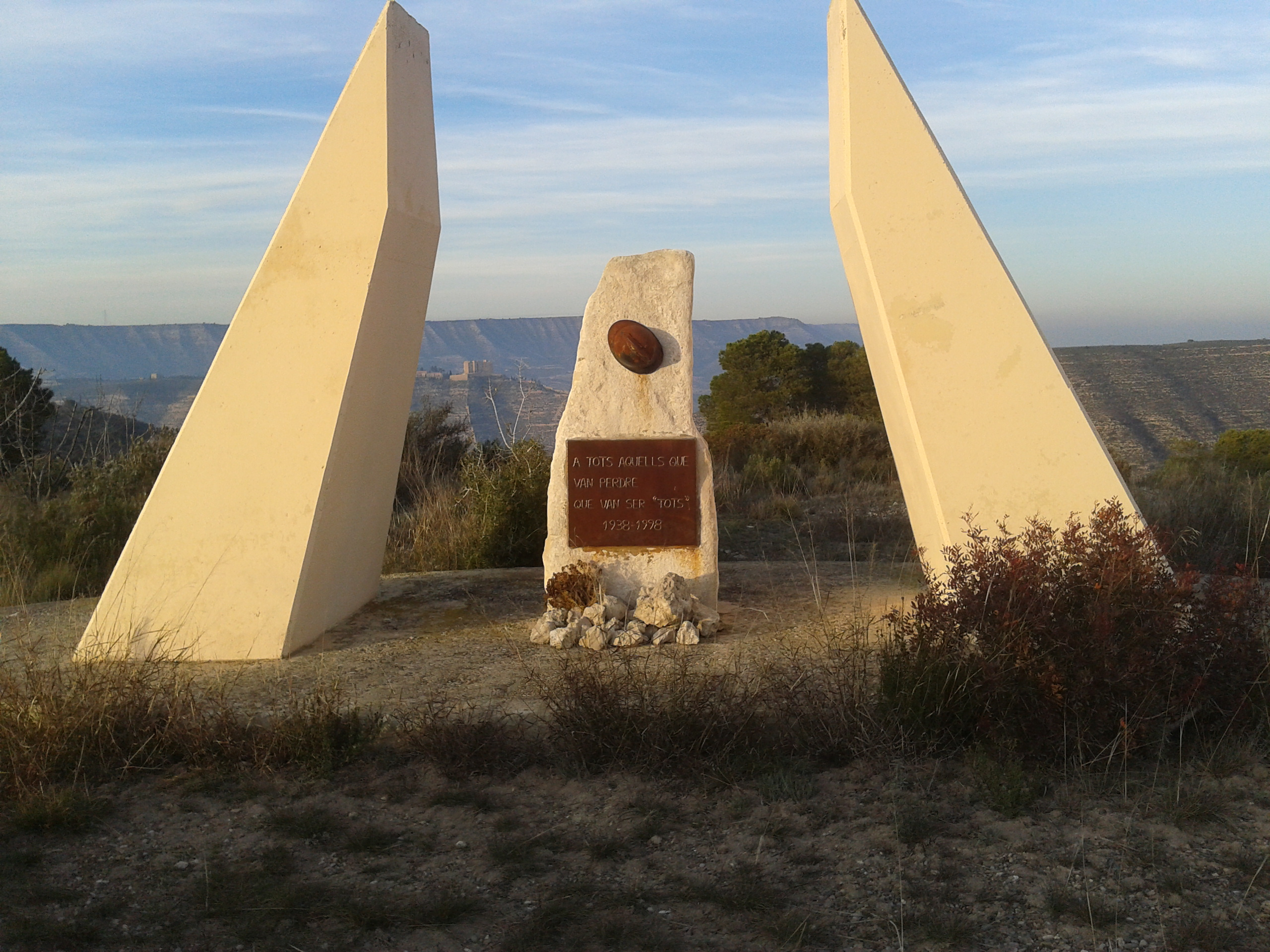
Alto de los Auts Monument

In the course of the Spanish Civil War in 1936–1939, Mequinenza and its municipal area were the scenes of bloody combats of the Battle of the Ebro, between June and November 1938. The Auts were the scene of violent fighting during the initial phase of the battle of the Ebro, where the 42nd Republican Division began to cross the Ebro river in this area on the morning of 25 July. The plan of the operation of the Mequinenza-Fayón by the Republican Army was to cross the Ebro river and the conquest a bridgehead. The balance of the battle of the Auts was one of the bloodiest in the entire battle of the Ebro. On the republican side, 817 dead and 1,328 prisoners, not counting the wounded and disappeared (about 3,000 casualties), and by the Francoist Army, 135 dead and 1284 wounded. The objective of the republican offensive was to fix the enemy's reserves and cut the road from Mequinenza to Maella. This knot, however, was never conquered. To the initial effort of the 226 Brigade and part of the 227 Brigade of the 42nd Republican Division, the Francoists replied with the progressive arrival of reinforcements. The offensive continued day after day with no significant progress despite heavy fighting. On 1 August, a double aerial and artillery bombardment preceded a first counterattack by Francoist forces. The republicans would attack again two days in a last attempt to conquer the long-awaited 'Gilbert Crossing', while on 6 August there was a definitive counterattack by the Francoist army, forcing the republican army to defend itself, avoiding the collapse of the entire division. Finally, the survivors of the 42nd Republican Division had to cross the Ebro again in the opposite direction. As a consequence of the Battle of the Ebro, the bridge over the Ebro in Mequinenza was destroyed.

Six decades after the events, on 8 August 1998, the group of republican survivors of the "Quinta del Biberón" inaugurated the monument erected on the hillside of Alto de los Auts, a key position, the highest and most strongly defended by the Republicans. The monument, designed by Javier Torres, is presided over by two plates, in Catalan and Spanish, and two helmets on each side. The plaque says: 'To all those who lost, who were all'. Up to 250 combatants accompanied by their families participated in the homage. After depositing a wreath at the foot of the monument, the veterans recalled the thirst, heat and diseases they suffered during the combats.

=== 20th century ===
==== The development of the Mequinenza coalfield ====
The arrival of the twentieth century led to an increase in the demand for coal and the development of the Mequinenza coal basin. The first initial exploitations were totally underground through galleries and inclined planes depending on the coal levels. Originally, the wagons were used with animal traction until around 1920, when they began to be replaced by mechanical and electrical traction.

In 1880 Carbonífera del Ebro company was founded, which would become the most important company in the Mequinenza basin. The growth was focused on Mequinenza since it was the natural epicenter of the basin although it also grew nearby towns such as La Granja d'Escarp, Torrente de Cinca or Fayón. In twenty years, from 1900 to 1920, the town grew from 2,400 inhabitants to 4,200, mostly men. An avalanche that was repeated again in the 1940s. The numbers are imprecise, but in 1945 the chief engineer of the Zaragoza district stated that the mining population, among workers and family, was 4,132 people. There were three main mining colonies called Virgen del Pilar, Previsión and Electroquímica de Flix. The mining colonies of Mequinenza came to host more than 900 people in 1945. Mequinenza became a mining town where Aragonese miners arrived (from Andorra, Utrillas, Montalbán, Alcorisa or Aliaga) and also from Asturias, Andalusia, Murcia and Galicia. Mining transformed the local community and modified also the traditional economic activity, based on rainfed agriculture.

==== Towpath ====
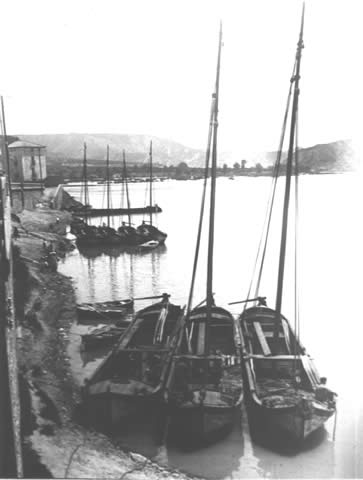
Llauts in Mequinenza

Llauts, traditional wooden boats about 20 or 25 meters long, were essential to transport up to 30 tons of lignite on each trip. Constructed of local hardwood, the Llauts used the current of the river to make the journey south, and when they had to return to Mequinenza they could use wind extending the square sails that the skipper maneuvered. When the wind was not blowing enough or it was contrary, the Llauts had to climb the towpath, that is, pulling them from the shore upstream This was known as "Camí de Sirga" (or towpath in English). Until 1914 the towpath was made by three men for each Llaut that were relieved every hour and a half or two hours. Carbonífera del Ebro made an attempt to incorporate steamships to transport lignite, but the Ebro's drainage and its complicated orography made its use too difficult. Flix Electrochemical Society (SEQF), which had mining concessions in Mequinenza, decided in 1920 to suppress the human force and change it for animal traction. This was a unique transport system in the world, in which the coal that was extracted from the mines, led to different landings at the foot of the river and transported by river route to Tortosa or Fayón.

==== World War I ====
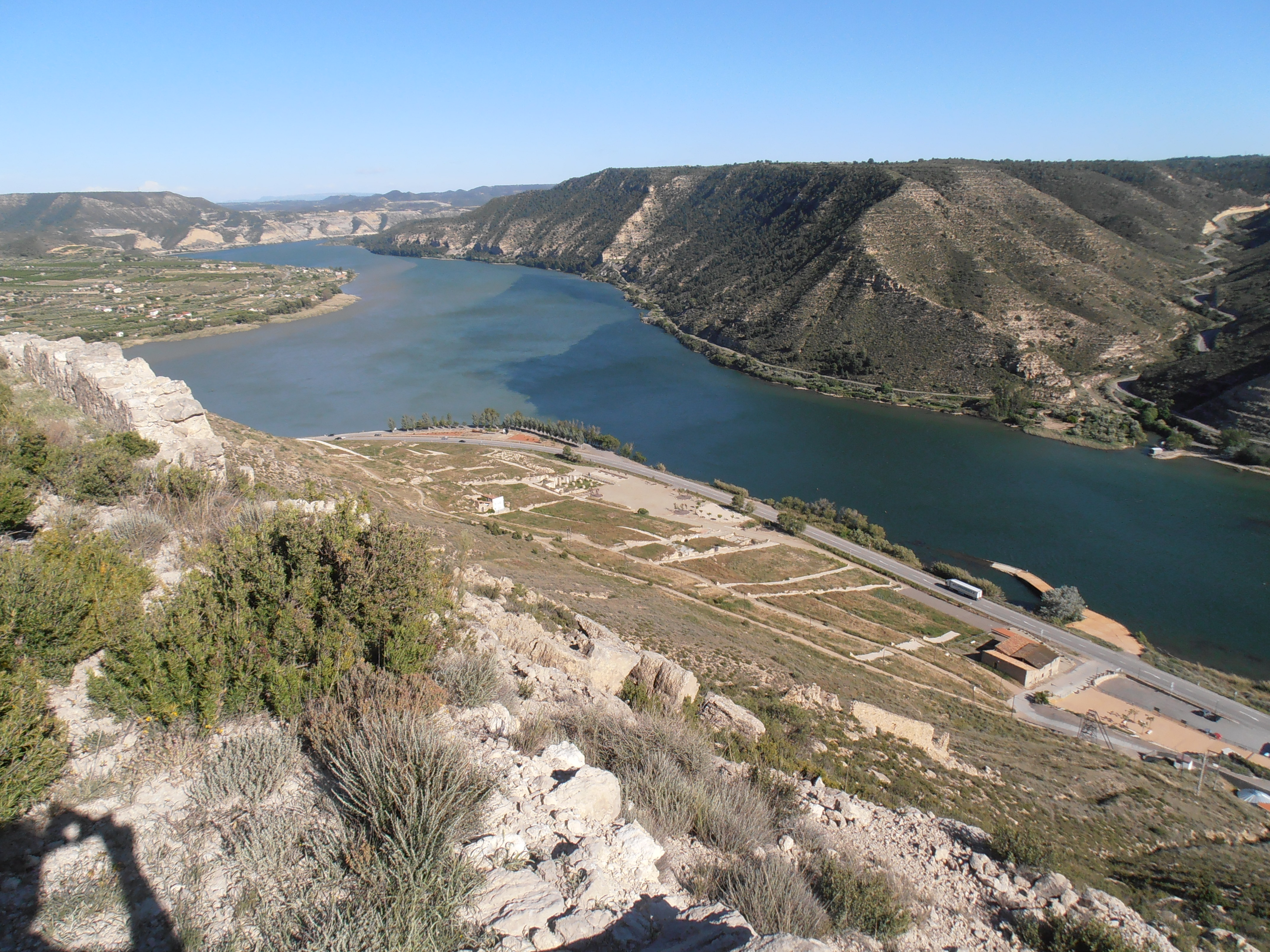
View of the old town of Mequinenza from the castle

The favorable situation during the years of World War I where the basin extracted up to 30% of the national coal, allowed to accumulate enough capital in the companies of the coal basin to start a second modernization between 1924 and 1925. Compressed air and electricity were introduced into the mines, a fact that allowed the coal extraction capacity to be further increased. In the late 1950s, the Mequinenza miners saw their jobs threatened in part by the construction of the Mequinenza and Riba-roja reservoirs, which would flood the mining galleries. In the mid-1970s, great changes were introduced in the coal exploitation systems, going from small galleries to much larger galleries, using new and safer systems that allowed higher extraction yields.

==== End of coal era ====
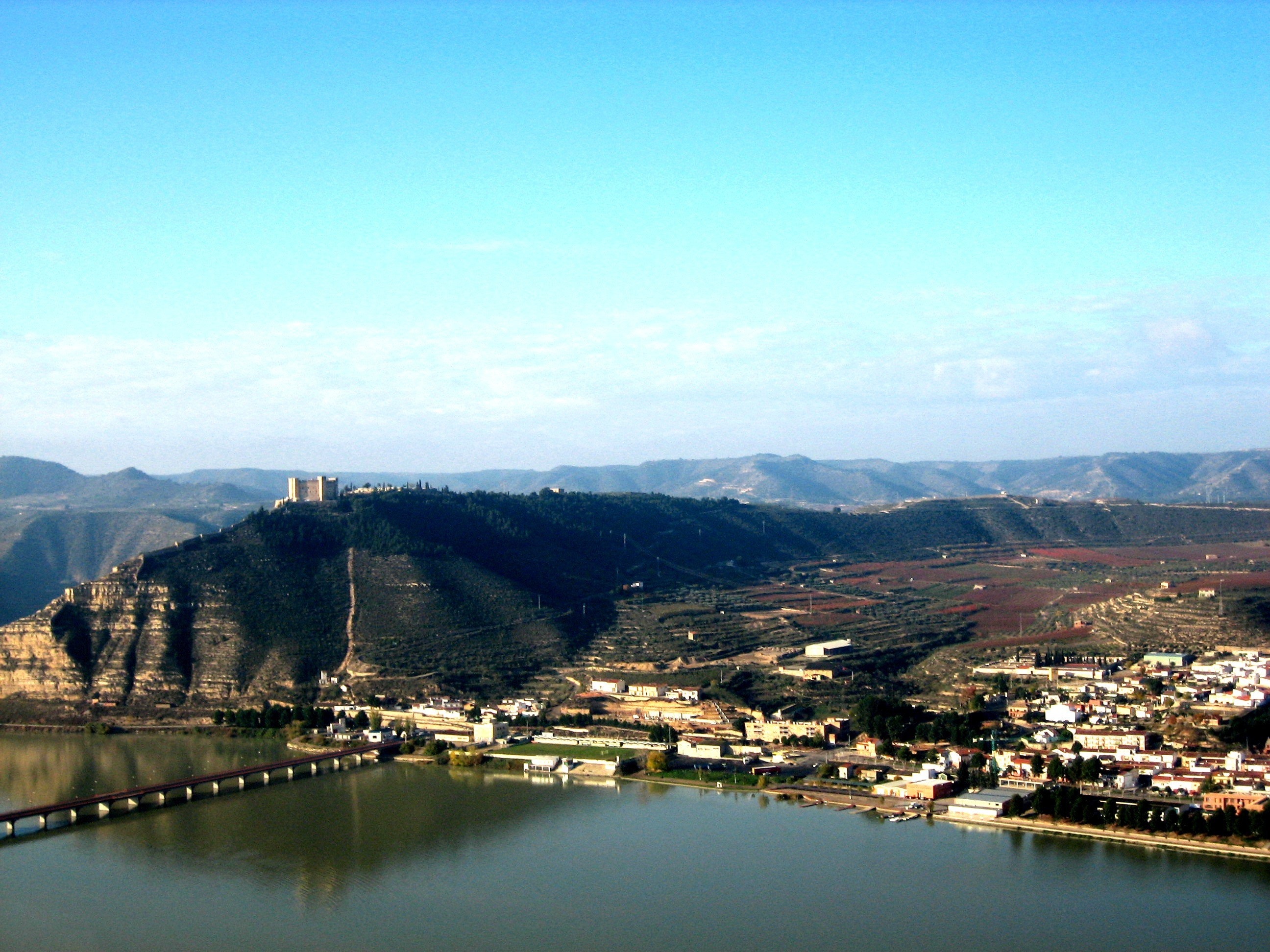
New town of Mequinenza on the banks of Segre river

In 2010, MIBSA (Minera del Bajo Segre), which shared coal mining operations on the border between the province of Lleida and Mequinenza, closed. At that time, the company had more than 130 kilometers of galleries in its concessions. In 2013, Carbonífera del Ebro suffered a serious economic setback due to Endesa's refusal to burn the coal of Mequinenza at the Escucha power station, leaving the future of Carbonífera del Ebro and all the direct and indirect jobs in Mequinenza in the air. The staff of the mining company undertook various mobilizations actively participating in the Black March towards Madrid, remembering with pride "that since 1880 they had fed the factories of the industrial belt of Barcelona". After months of waiting in 2014, Carbonífera del Ebro announced that the situation was unsustainable and was closing its doors under the non-competitive Mine Closure Plan of the Ministry of Industry.

From the old town to the new Mequinenza

The construction of the Ribarroja and the Mequinenza dam meant the disappearance of most of the urban area and, consequently, the tragic end of the ancient town. Although the waters of the reservoir did not completely cover the urban nucleus, they did deny most of the riverside farmlands. The disappearance of the urban layout meant a radical change of life for its neighbors who, in addition to abandoning their homes and witnessing their demolition, also saw the disappearance of an economy based on industry, coal mining and fluvial commerce. The only building in the old town of Mequinenza that was preserved, was the María Quintana School Group that today it's the headquarters of the Museums of Mequinenza. Mequinenza was reborn when its inhabitants built a new town a few kilometers from the old town. Modern and touristic, the new Mequinenza offers active and sports tourism, as well as a cultural hub in the Bajo Cinca region.

== Local council ==
Mayor: Magdalena Godía Ibarz, Spanish Socialist Workers' Party (PSOE)

== See also ==
- List of municipalities in Zaragoza
