= 145th Mixed Brigade =

- 145.ª Brigada Mixta
- Active: May 1937–January 1939
- Country: Spain
- Allegiance: (Second Spanish Republic) Republican faction
- Branch: Spanish Republican Army
- Type: Infantry
- Size: Brigade
- Engagements: Spanish Civil War: Zaragoza Offensive; Aragon Offensive; Battle of the Ebro; Catalonia Offensive

The 145th Mixed Brigade was a unit of the Spanish Republican Army created during the Spanish Civil War. Throughout the war, it operated on the Aragon, Segre and Catalonia fronts, although it did not play a relevant role.

== History ==
The unit was created in Girona between May and June 1937, from troops from the old Mountain battalions. After completing the training period, the 145th Mixed Brigade was assigned to the 44th Division of the XII Army Corps and under the command of the militia major Álvaro Costea Juan, with Antonio Rodés Ballester as political commissar. The brigade, located in the Híjar-Albalate del Arzobispo area, was deployed as a reserve force during the Zaragoza Offensive.

In the spring of 1938, during the Aragon Offensive, it did not play a prominent role. (Note: According to some authors, the brigade was briefly added to the so-called Autonomous Group of the Ebro.)

At the end of May, the 145th Mixed Brigade took part in the assault on the nationalist bridgehead of Serós. In August it was one of the units selected to participate in the Vilanova de la Barca offensive. On 9 August three of their companies crossed the Segre river through the Vilanova de la Barca area, together with other forces, managing to form a bridgehead in nationalist territory; the attempt, however, failed since this bridgehead only held out for three days.

Later it intervened in the Battle of the Ebro, in support of the republican forces deployed there. On 9 September it relieved members of the 16th Division in the Vilalba dels Arcs-La Pobla de Masaluca sector, a zone that it garrisoned until the beginning of October, when it was replaced and sent to the Coll del Coso sector. In this area, between La Fatarella and Venta de Camposines, the 145th Mixed brigade faced several nationalist attacks between 8 and 20 October; the brigade suffered a considerable number of casualties, also losing several strategic positions. On 12 November it had to cross the Ebro River by a footbridge north of Ascó.

During the Catalonia Offensive it participated in the defense of Juncosa (Note: Where it was sent by the Republican command to support the defense, together with the 144th Mixed Brigade.) and Santa Coloma de Queralt, without having more news of its performance.

== Command ==
Commanders

- Infantry Captain Fernando Olivenza Rodríguez;
- Militia Major Álvaro Costea Juan;
- Militia Major Pedro Guardia Hernández;

Commissars

- Antonio Rodés Ballester, of the CNT;
- Víctor Torres Pereyra;

Chief of Staff

- Militia Lieutenant Ángel Royo Royo;

== Bibliography ==
- Álvarez, Santiago (1989). Los comisarios políticos en el Ejército Popular de la República (in Spanish). Ediciós do Castro.
- Engel, Carlos (1999). Historia de las Brigadas Mixtas del Ejército Popular de la República (in Spanish). Madrid: Almena. ISBN 84-922644-7-0.
- Maldonado, José M.ª (2007). El frente de Aragón. La Guerra Civil en Aragón (1936–1938) (in Spanish). Mira Editores. ISBN 978-84-8465-237-3.
- Martínez Bande, José Manuel (1975). La llegada al mar (in Spanish). Madrid: Editorial San Martín.
- Martínez Bande, José Manuel (1978). La Batalla del Ebro (in Spanish). Madrid: San Martín.
- Martínez Bande, José Manuel (1979). La Campaña de Cataluña (in Spanish). Madrid: San Martín.
