= Fayón =

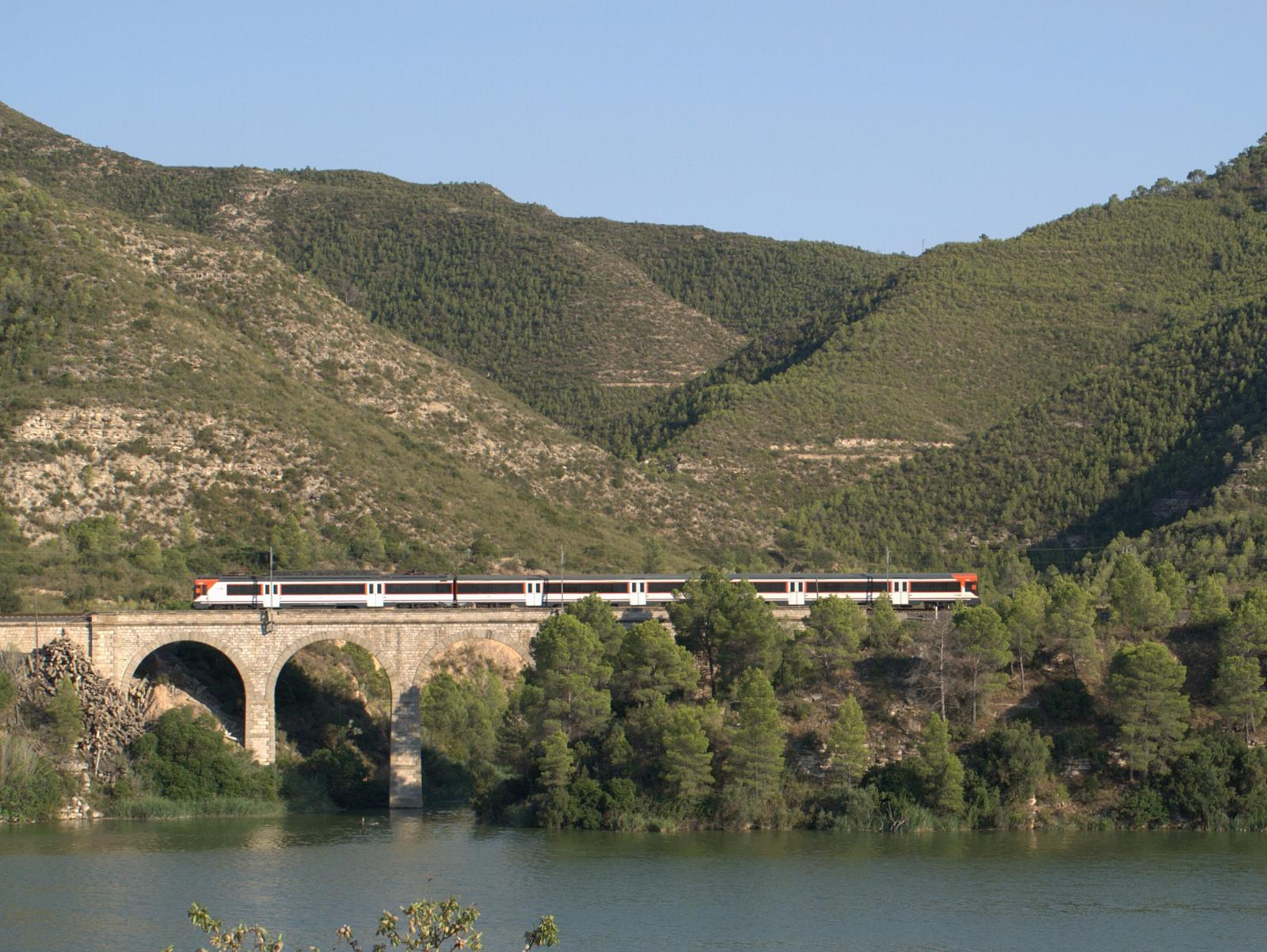

- Flag Coat of arms

- Location within Aragon Location within Spain Location within Europe
- Coordinates: 41°15′N 0°21′E
- Country: Spain
- Autonomous community: Aragon
- Province: Zaragoza
- Municipality: Fayón

Area
  - Total: 67 km^{2} (26 sq mi)
- Elevation: 92 m (302 ft)

Population (2025-01-01)
  - Total: 448
  - Density: 6.7/km^{2} (17/sq mi)
- Time zone: UTC+1 (CET)
  - Summer (DST): UTC+2 (CEST)

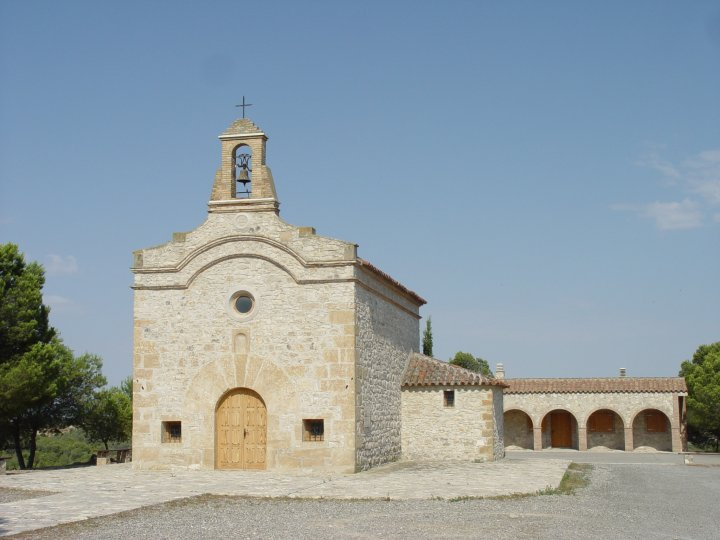
Ermita de San Jorge shrine

Fayón (Spanish: [faˈʝon]) or Faió (Catalan: [faˈjo]) is a municipality located in the province of Zaragoza, Aragon, Spain. According to the 2004 census (INE), the municipality has a population of 395 inhabitants. Fayón is located between the Ebro and the Matarranya rivers in La Franja area; the local dialect is a variant of Catalan.

== History ==
Historically Fayón and its municipal term were considered part of the Matarraña; presently it is included in the Bajo Aragón-Caspe comarca.

During the Battle of the Ebro some of the most bloody battles in the Spanish Civil War were fought in the Auts area, about 8 km north of Fayón. On 25 July 1938 the 42 division of the Spanish Republican Army successfully crossed the river in this area but was surrounded and massacred in the Auts hills by the rebels.

Traditionally Fayón was part of the Roman Catholic Diocese of Lerida. In 1955 the Cesaraugustanae et aliarum decree of the Consistorial Congregation was published; on the 2 September of the same year, Fayón, along with Mequinenza, was segregated from Lleida and merged with the Archdiocese of Zaragoza.

The ancestral village was submerged by the waters of the Ribarroja Reservoir in 1967 and the present-day village was built by ENHER, the state-owned company that built the dam. After the closure of the nearby coal mines, Fayón has lost about 50% of its population.

== See also ==
- Bajo Aragón-Caspe
- Matarraña
- La Franja
- List of municipalities in Zaragoza
