= Bajo Aragón-Caspe =

Bajo Aragón-Caspe/Baix Aragó-Casp
- Comarca
- Interactive map of Bajo Aragón-Caspe/Baix Aragó-Casp
- Coordinates: 41°14′N 0°2′E
- Country: Spain
- Autonomous community: Aragon
- Province: Zaragoza
- Capital: Caspe/Casp
- Municipalities: List: See text

Area
  - Total: 997.3 km^{2} (385.1 sq mi)

Population
  - Total: 12,604
  - Density: 12.64/km^{2} (32.73/sq mi)
- Time zone: UTC+1 (CET)
  - Summer (DST): UTC+2 (CEST)

Bajo Aragón-Caspe (Spanish: [ˈbaxo aɾaˈɣoŋ ˈkaspe]) or Baix Aragó-Casp (Catalan: [ˈbaʒ aɾaˈɣo ˈkasp]) is a comarca in eastern Aragon, bordering the Spanish Autonomous Community of Catalonia.

It borders the Aragonese comarques of Matarranya, Monegros, Bajo Cinca, Bajo Martín and Ribera Baja del Ebro, and the Catalan comarques of Terra Alta, Baix Ebre, and Ribera d'Ebre.

This comarca is named after the town of Caspe, its capital. Its main income is derived from the production of olive oil.

== Municipalities ==
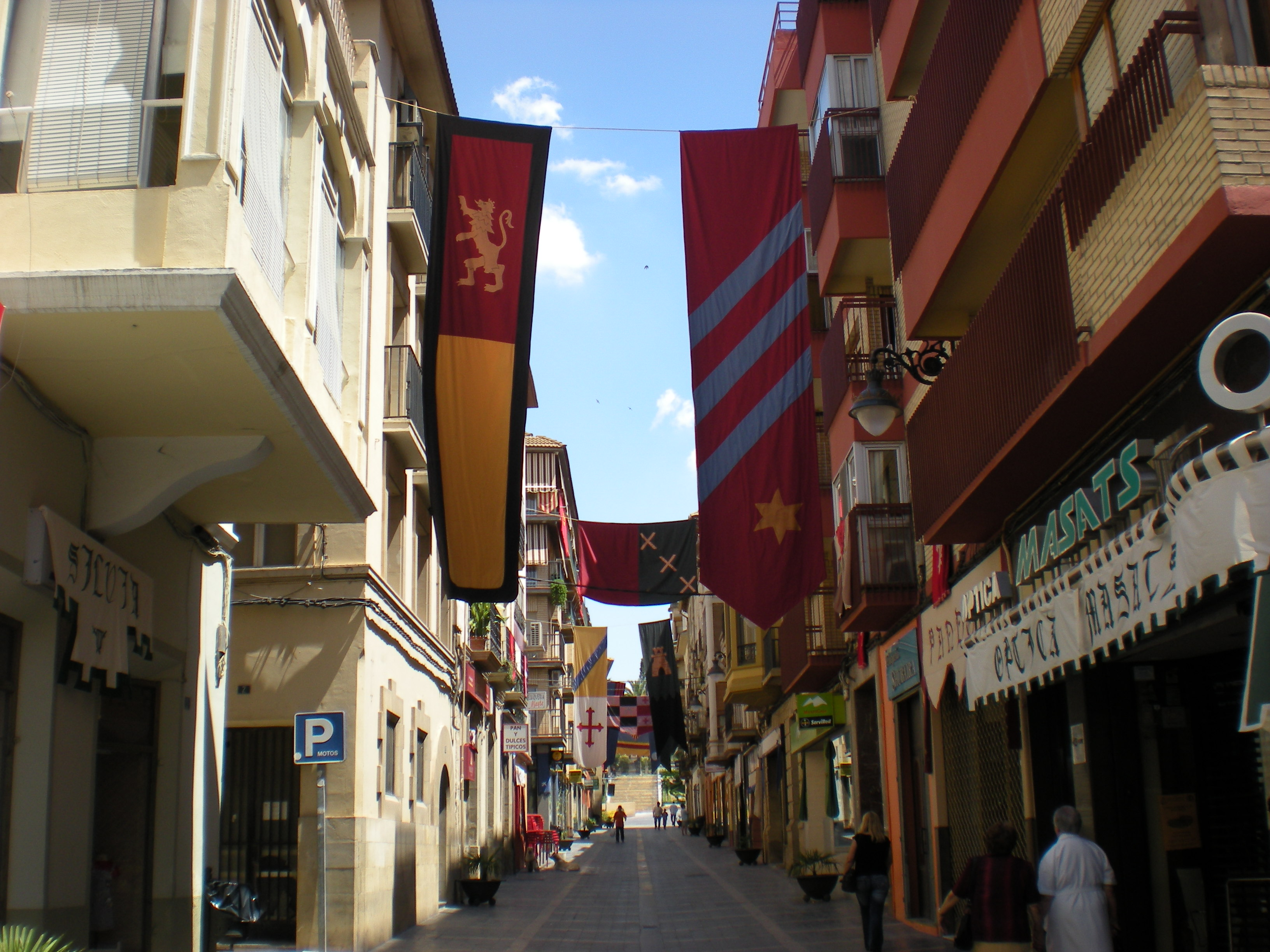
Caspe/Casp, main street

The Catalan version of the names of the towns are in brackets.

- Caspe (Casp)
- Chiprana
- Fayón (Faió)
- Fabara (Favara de Matarranya)
- Maella
- Nonaspe (Nonasp)

== See also ==
- La Franja
- Lower Aragon
