= Móra la Nova =

- Municipality
- Coat of arms

- Location in Catalonia
- Coordinates: 41°06′01″N 0°39′03″E
- Country: Spain
- Community: Catalonia
- Province: Tarragona
- Comarca: Ribera d'Ebre

Government
  - Mayor: Francesc Moliné Rovira (2015)

Area
  - Total: 15.9 km^{2} (6.1 sq mi)
- Elevation: 31 m (102 ft)

Population (2025-01-01)
  - Total: 3,350
  - Density: 211/km^{2} (546/sq mi)
- Demonym(s): Moranovenc, moranovenca
- Website: www.moralanova.cat

Móra la Nova (Catalan pronunciation: [ˈmoɾa la ˈnɔβa]) is a municipality in the comarca, or district, of the Ribera d'Ebre in Catalonia, Spain. It is situated on the left bank of the Ebre river, facing the district capital Móra d'Ebre. It is served by a Renfe railway station on the line between Tarragona and Zaragoza and by the N-420 road to Gandesa and Reus.

== Demographics ==
It has a population of 3,350 (register office, 2025).

1900	1930	1950	1970	1986	2007
1865	2145	2696	2940	2870	3189

== Bibliography ==
- Panareda Clopés, Josep Maria; Rios Calvet, Jaume; Rabella Vives, Josep Maria (1989). Guia de Catalunya, Barcelona: Caixa de Catalunya. ISBN 84-87135-01-3 (Spanish). ISBN 84-87135-02-1 (Catalan).
