= Móra d'Ebre =

- Municipality
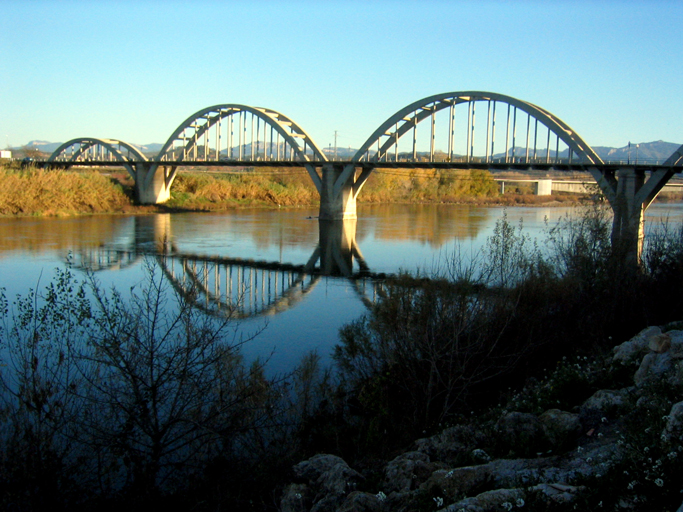
- Bridge over the Ebre river at Móra d'Ebre.

- Flag Coat of arms

- Location in Catalonia
- Coordinates: 41°05′36″N 0°38′34″E
- Country: Spain
- Community: Catalonia
- Province: Tarragona
- Comarca: Ribera d'Ebre

Government
  - Mayor: Joan Piñol Mora (2015)

Area
  - Total: 45.1 km^{2} (17.4 sq mi)
- Elevation: 142 m (466 ft)

Population (2025-01-01)
  - Total: 5,811
  - Density: 129/km^{2} (334/sq mi)
- Demonym: Morenc
- Postal code: 43740
- Climate: Csa
- Website: moradebre.cat

Móra d'Ebre (Catalan pronunciation: [ˈmoɾa ˈðeβɾe]) is the capital of the comarca of the Ribera d'Ebre in Catalonia, Spain. It has a population of 5,811 (register office, 2025).

It is situated on the right bank of the Ebre river in the Móra Hollow, and is served by the N-420 road to Reus and Gandesa, the N-230 road to Lleida. The Renfe railway line between Tarragona and Zaragoza runs along the left bank of the river, with a station at Móra la Nova opposite the urban centre of Móra d'Ebre.

== History ==
The most ancient settlements in the area date to 4th millennium BC, to the Neolithic culture of the ditch sepulchres. Later the Iberians lived here until the Roman conquest.

The area was reconquered from the Moors in 1153, by count Ramon Berenguer IV of Barcelona. Later the town became part of the Barony of Entença. The baronial castle of Móra d'Ebre is located on a hill overlooking the river and the town. It is now in a state of semi-ruin, for it was used as a fortress during the Spanish Civil War and was heavily shelled and bombed. Nowadays some reconstruction has taken place in the western side. Many of the houses of the town are also in a ruinous state and reconstruction has only been haphazard.

== Notable locals ==
- Ton Alcover (born 1990), footballer
- Ernesto Domínguez (born 1941), footballer
- Benito Messeguer (1930–1982), Spanish-Mexican artist

== See also ==
- La Picossa (Móra d'Ebre)
