= Mount Picossa =

Mountain in Spain

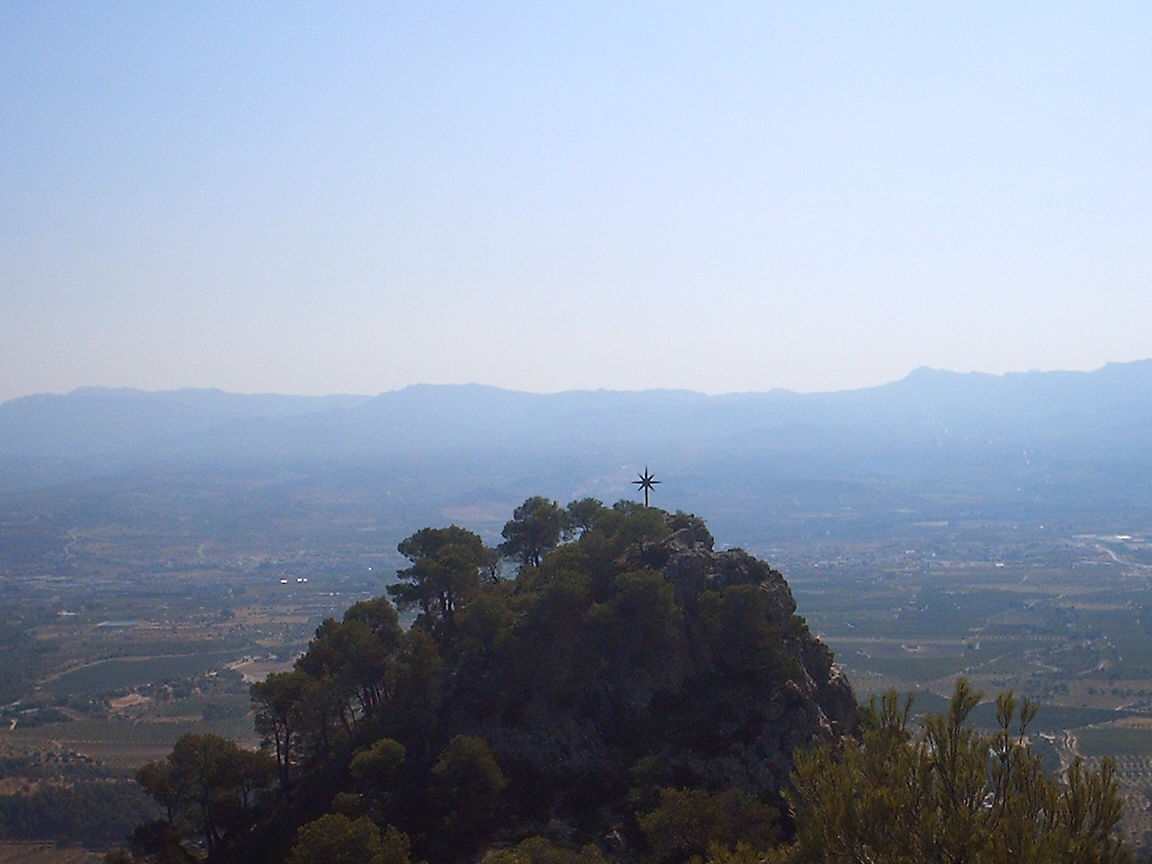
- View of the summit from the air

Highest point
- Elevation: 495.8 m (1,627 ft)
- Listing: Mountains of Catalonia
- Coordinates: 41°06′33″N 0°34′35″E

Naming
- Native name: La Picossa (Catalan)

Geography
- Location within Catalonia
- Country: Spain
- Community: Catalonia
- County: Ribera d'Ebre
- City: Móra d'Ebre
- Parent range: Isolated hill in the Catalan Central Depression

Climbing
- First ascent: Unknown
- Easiest route: From Móra d'Ebre

Mount Picossa (Catalan: La Picossa) is a mountain in Catalonia, Spain. It is located within the Móra d'Ebre municipal limits, Ribera d'Ebre.

The summit used to be a breeding ground for the Bonelli's eagle, but in the last few years the birds have failed to reproduce. Human disturbance has been deemed to be the cause and the access to the mountain has been restricted.

== Geography ==
Mount Picossa is an isolated hill of the Catalan Central Depression. There is a triangulation station at the top marked "251139001". The Serra de Cavalls can be seen in the horizon looking south.

== History ==
During the Battle of the Ebro of the Spanish Civil War there was an observation point of the Republican Military on top of the hill which was bombed by the Francoist faction before the collapsing of the front. The 42nd Division camped at the hill on 8 November 1938 during its withdrawal, having lost many of its troops and its pace being hampered by the many wounded. By 10 November the Francoists had occupied Mount Picossa.
