= 59th Mixed Brigade =

- 59.ª Brigada Mixta
- Active: January 1937 - February 1939
- Country: Spanish Republic
- Allegiance: Republican faction
- Branch: Spanish Civil War
- Type: Infantry
- Part of: 42nd Division
- Engagements: Spanish Civil War: Battle of Albarracín; Battle of Alfambra; Battle of the Ebro; Battle of the Segre

The 59th Mixed Brigade was a unit of the Spanish Republican Army created during the Spanish Civil War. It came to operate on the Teruel and Ebro fronts.

== History ==
=== First phase ===
The unit was created in January 1937, on the Teruel front, from the militarization of the Rosal Column; it was integrated into the 42nd Division of the 13th Army Corps. Command of the new brigade fell to the anarchist militiaman José Neira Jarabo, an electrician affiliated with the CNT-FAI, while the anarchist Sigfrido Canut Martorell was appointed as its political commissar.

Deployed in the Montes Universales sector, in July 1937 it took part in the Battle of Albarracín. Later, the 59th Brigade was deployed north of Teruel, covering the northern flank of the Republican front in Santa Bárbara de Celadas. The Battle of Alfambra began with an attack by nationalist forces on 5 February 1938, forcing the brigade's withdrawal from the entire front they defended. (Note: In the days prior to the battle the brigade command received information about an abnormal movement of vehicles and troops in the nationalist zone. Despite this, the command of the 59th Brigade dismissed the reports and took no action in this regard.) The enemy attack caused a break in the unit, which suffered heavy casualties. Two days later, on 7 February, the remnants of the brigade managed to concentrate in Peralejos, withdrawing over the Alfambra river and dissolving the brigade.

After the dissolution of the 59th Brigade, in August 1938, Neira was given command of the 36th Division.

=== Second phase ===
In late 1938, the 59th Mixed Brigade was recreated again within the 42nd Division, from Marine Corps forces.

On the night of 25-26 July, the unit concentrated to the east of the town of Móra la Nova. The next day the brigade crossed the Ebro through the Ribarroja-Fayón sector, reaching the line that ran from Els Auts, the road junction from Maella to Fraga and the mouth of the Matarraña river. However, on 6 August it had to abandon the so-called "Fayón-Mequinenza pocket" and return to the other shore. Compared to the other brigades of the division (226th and 227th), the 59th Brigade was the one that had suffered the least amount of attrition. After undergoing a reorganization, around 14 September it returned to the front line and relieved troops from the 3rd Division in the Sierra de Cavalls. Between 8 and 20 October it faced sustained enemy assaults, having to abandon its positions; after the front was broken, on 5 November, the 59th Brigade lost the town of Miravet and two days later it had to withdraw from Móra d'Ebre. Finally, on 12 November, it would cross the river again.

After the beginning of the Aragon Offensive, the brigade was sent to the Sierra de la Llena sector to try to stop the advance of the nationalists. Shortly after, it would be assigned to the reserve of the 15th Army Corps, but it would not take long for it to be involved again in the fighting in the Battle of the Segre. During the remainder of the campaign, the 59th Brigade would continue to retreat north, towards the French border, which it would cross on 9 February at the post of Portbou.

== Command ==
Commanders

- José Neira Jarabo;
- Eduardo García

Commissars

- Sigfrido Canut Martorell

== See also ==
- Mixed Brigades
- Rosal Column

== Bibliography ==
- Álvarez, Santiago (1989). Los comisarios políticos en el Ejército Popular de la República (in Spanish). Ediciós do Castro.
- Cabrera Castillo, Francisco (2002). Del Ebro a Gandesa. La batalla del Ebro, julio-noviembre 193 (in Spanish). Almena.
- Casas de la Vega, Rafael (1976). Alfambra. La reconquista de Teruel (in Spanish). L. de Caralt.
- Engel, Carlos (1999). Historia de las brigadas mixtas del Ejército Popular de la República (in Spanish). Almena Ediciones.
- Llarch, Joan (1976). Cipriano Mera. Un anarquista en la guerra de España (in Spanish). Euros.
- Martínez Bande, José Manuel (1981). La batalla de Pozoblanco y el cierre de la bolsa de Mérida (in Spanish). Madrid: San Martín.
- Modesto, Juan (1978). Soy del Quinto Regimiento (in Spanish). Editorial Laia.
