= 61st Mixed Brigade =

Unit of the Spanish Republican Army

- 61.ª Brigada Mixta
- Active: January 1937 – March 1939
- Country: Spanish Republic
- Allegiance: Republican faction
- Branch: Spanish Republican Army
- Type: Infantry
- Size: Brigade
- Engagements: Spanish Civil War

Commanders
- Notable commanders: Bernabé López Calle

The 61st Mixed Brigade was a unit of the Spanish Republican Army that took part in the Spanish Civil War. Throughout the war, the brigade was present on the Teruel, Aragon, Levante and Extremadura fronts.

== History ==
The unit was created in January 1937, on the Teruel front, from forces of the Rosal Column. Most of the members of the new 61st Mixed Brigade were anarchist militants. The first head of the brigade was the Bernabé López Calle, and the brigade was integrated into the 42nd Division. A few months later the unit was located in the Bezas-Royuela sector, together with the 60th Mixed Brigade.

=== Front of Teruel ===
The unit took part in the Battle of Albarracín. On July 5, it broke the enemy front, and two days later managed to occupy the urban area of Albarracín; the nationalist garrison was besieged in the Cathedral and the Civil Guard barracks, after the 61st MB took the “Vallejo Largo” Vertex and the town of Monterde. However, the arrival of a nationalist relief force thwarted all the advances made up to then and the brigade had to return to its initial positions. By July 17, the unit was defending the Lomas del Calarizo-La Cañadilla-Chaparrales-Vértice Barranco defensive line.

At the beginning of 1938, when the nationalist counteroffensive against Teruel began, the 61st Brigade was located in the republican vanguard, in Sierra Palomera, a position in which it had remained since the beginning of the Battle of Teruel. The nationalist attack took place at the meeting point between the 61st Mixed Brigade and the 132nd Mixed Brigade; the 61st MB was completely overwhelmed by the enemy attack in this sector, and as a consequence had to retreat disorderly towards the rear to avoid the enemy encirclement. The Republican command withdrew the 42nd Division from the front, proceeding to dissolve it and dismiss a good number of brigade officers, as was the case of the brigade commissar, Antonio Rodríguez Saravia. For his part, Bernabé López Calle ceded command to Francisco García Lavid. (Note: This was significant, given that Francisco García Lavid, who was a communist, went on to command an entirely anarchist brigade.)

=== Fighting in Aragon ===
At the beginning of March 1938, while it was undergoing a reorganization, the nationalists launched the Aragon Offensive through the Belchite sector. The 61st MB, still not fully equipped, was sent urgently to try to plug the enemy gap. It was temporarily attached to the 18th Army Corps, (Note: The brigade was added to the 72nd Division.) a formation that would end up retreating before strong enemy pressure. During this withdrawal, some forces of the 61st MB were isolated north of the Ebro River, although most of the unit became part of the 13th Army Corps. The unit continued to retreat towards the Maestrazgo, pursued by nationalist forces. By April 5, the brigade was located in Morella, where it established a defensive line together with the 52nd and 211th mixed brigades; however, one of the battalions of the 61st MB fled in disarray before the enemy attack, which led to the collapse of the entire front. This failure was mainly blamed on the 61st brigade. As a consequence, one of its officers was shot in the presence of the troops as a lesson.

=== Levante Campaign ===
In mid-April, after the Republican zone was cut in two, the 61st MB was dissolved. However, on April 30 it was re-founded, adding the new unit to the 8th Division of the 6th Army Corps. Once the restructuring was completed, it was assigned to the 65th Division, with which it left for the Levante front on May 13. By then, the leadership of the 61st MB was in the hands of Luis García Vega, with Pedro López Calle as commissioner.

Initially concentrated in Liria, shortly thereafter it would be located between Puerto de Escandón and the Valbona river, south of Teruel. On May 28, it had to face a nationalist assault, which attacked the positions of Formiche Bajo and Loma del Erizal, where the 61st Brigade maintained strong resistance. However, due to enemy pressure, the brigade had to undertake a slow retreat until on July 21 its forces reached the defenses of the XYZ Line.

It was briefly attached to the 68th Division in Chiva, in the Republican rear.

=== Extremadura Front ===
After the stabilization of the Levante front, the brigade was assigned to the 41st Division and sent as reinforcement to the Extremadura front. Later it became part of the 63rd Division of the 7th Army Corps. However, until the end of the war it did not take part in relevant military operations.

== Command ==
Commanders

- Bernabé López Calle;
- Francisco García Lavid;
- Luis García Vega;

Commissars

- Antonio Rodríguez Saravia;
- Pedro López Calle, of the CNT;

== See also ==
- Mixed Brigades
- Rosal Column

== Bibliography ==
- Álvarez, Santiago (1989). Los comisarios políticos en el Ejército Popular de la República (in Spanish). Ediciós do Castro.
- Casas de la Vega, Rafael (1976). Alfambra. La reconquista de Teruel (in Spanish). L. de Caralt.
- Engel, Carlos (1999). Historia de las Brigadas mixtas del Ejército Popular de la República (in Spanish). Madrid: Almena. ISBN 84-922644-7-0.
- Maldonado, José M.ª (2007). El frente de Aragón. La Guerra Civil en Aragón (1936–1938) (in Spanish). Mira Editores. ISBN 978-84-8465-237-3.
- Martínez Bande, José Manuel (1973). La Gran ofensiva sobre Zaragoza (in Spanish). Madrid: Editorial San Martín.
- Martínez Bande, José Manuel (1975). La llegada al mar (in Spanish). Madrid: San Martín. ISBN 84-7140-115-0.
- Martínez Bande, José Manuel (1977). La ofensiva sobre Valencia (in Spanish). Madrid: San Martín. ISBN 84-7140-142-8.
- Martínez Bande, José Manuel (1981). La batalla de Pozoblanco y el cierre de la bolsa de Mérida (in Spanish). Madrid: Editorial San Martín.
- Téllez, Antonio (1992). Sabaté. Guerrilla urbana en España (1945-1960) (in Spanish). Virus.
- Zaragoza, Cristóbal (1983). Ejército Popular y Militares de la República, 1936-1939 (in Spanish). Barcelona: Ed. Planeta.
