= Rosal Column =

Anarchist militia column during the Spanish Civil War

- Columna del Rosal
- Active: 27 July 1936–February 1937
- Country: Spain
- Allegiance: Confederación Nacional del Trabajo
- Branch: Confederal militias
- Type: Militia column
- Size: 825 (August 1936); 2,300 (November 1936)
- Garrison/HQ: Tarancón, Cuenca
- Colours: Red; Black
- Engagements: Spanish Civil War: Aragon front; Siege of Madrid; Teruel Offensive

Commanders
- Commander: Francisco del Rosal
- Political officer: Cipriano Mera

The Rosal Column (Spanish: Columna del Rosal) was a column of the confederal militias that fought in the Spanish Civil War. The column was established by anarchists in Madrid, following the Spanish coup of July 1936, and was led by the trade unionist Cipriano Mera and lieutenant colonel Francisco del Rosal, the latter of whom gave the column its name. The column fought on the front in the province of Teruel, where it faced systemic issues with a lack of military discipline among militiamen. They failed to achieve their main goal of capturing the town of Albarracín, which remained under Nationalist control. At the beginning of the siege of Madrid, the Rosal Column attempted to prevent the government from fleeing the Spanish capital and detained many ministers at a security checkpoint in Tarancón. Mera then led part of the column to defend the city, fighting in the Battle of Ciudad Universitaria.

Upon their return to the Teruel front, continued failures to achieve their objectives prompted many of the column's militiamen to accept militarisation, although members of the Libertarian Youth were particularly resistant to it. In March 1937, the Rosal Column was transformed into the 42nd Division of the Popular Army, which was organised into the 59th, 60th and 61st Mixed Brigades. Cipriano Mera took command of the 14th Division and rose through the ranks to command the IV Army Corps.

== Formation ==
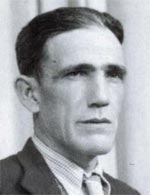
Cipriano Mera, the political officer of the Rosal Column

When the Spanish coup of July 1936 took place, anarchist militias took up arms to stop it. In the Spanish capital of Madrid, Cipriano Mera, a construction worker and trade union leader of the Confederación Nacional del Trabajo (CNT), led a militia column to put down the insurrection at the military barracks in Alcalá de Henares and Guadalajara. When the victory of the Republicans in Madrid was secured, the CNT Defence Committee nominated lieutenant colonel Francisco del Rosal to take command of the first militia column it organised in central Spain.

In the first four days of the Spanish Civil War, 4,000 people joined the confederal militias in Madrid and armed themselves with weapons seized from the Alcalá de Henares barracks. The largest militia column in the central region, which grew to count 835 fighters by August 1936, was established and jointly led by Mera and Rosal. Mera acted as the column's political officer, while Rosal was its military commander. The column took its name from Rosal, becoming known as the Rosal Column (Spanish: Columna del Rosal).

The Rosal Column consisted of two battalions: the Ferrer Battalion, commanded by Mera; and the Mora Battalion, commanded by Rosal Rico. Three journalists and a civil engineer made up its small general staff. It also gained a contingent of international volunteers, including 30 Italians, 10 Germans, 2 Swiss and 1 French person; the Italians constituted their own artillery battery, which they named after Sacco and Vanzetti.

== Teruel front ==
In the early months of the war, the Rosal Column was sent to the frontlines in Aragon, where Mera led an unsuccessful surprise attack against the city of Teruel. Many of the volunteers who joined the Column on the Teruel front proved to be unreliable, often refusing orders or deserting their posts. Some of the column's recruits were Valencian convicts who had been released from the San Miguel de los Reyes prison at the beginning of the war. On 15 September, the Column reported that many of their militiamen had abandoned their posts and returned home to their families at nightfall, "with thousands of excuses". Rosal reported that he had been forced to disarm half of the reinforcements who had arrived from Santa Olalla. Following a series of defeats on the front line, the CNT informed the general staff of the Rosal Column that it was now required to enforce military discipline within its ranks.

In mid-October, the Rosal Column arrived at the Montes Universales, where they captured a number of villages. They also fought in battle at Albarracín, but the Nationalists remained in control of the town. They then took over some of the positions of the Eixea-Uribes Column, which in turn occupied the positions of the Peire Column, which had itself been redeployed to Alfambra. They were later reinforced by militias from Valencia and the Macià-Companys Column from Catalonia. On 4 November, Salvador Rojo Jover, a captain of the Rosal Column, visited Madrid's San Antón prison and attempted to convince the prisoners to fight for the Republic. Rojo noted the names of the prisoners who refused and gave them to the Provincial Committee of Public Inquiry, which carried out their execution.

== Siege of Madrid ==
=== Tarancón checkpoint ===
On 6 November, when the Republican government fled Madrid to escape the coming siege, the Rosal Column attempted to stop them from leaving. At Tarancón, the column set up a security checkpoint and detained several government officials. The detainees included: Joan Peiró and Juan López Sánchez, the anarchist ministers of industry and commerce; Julio Álvarez del Vayo, the socialist minister of state; Jesús Hernández Tomás, the communist minister of education; and Pedro Rico, the Republic mayor of Madrid. Militiamen of the Rosal Column even threatened some of the ministers with execution on charges of cowardice. With the way through Tarancón blocked, the ministers were forced to make their way to Valencia by other routes. When Horacio Prieto, the General Secretary of the CNT, arrived in Tarancón, Cipriano Mera attempted to convince him to remain in Madrid in order to raise morale. Prieto defended his decision, so Mera denounced him as a "weakling" that was "unworthy" of his post. Mera declared that, while the officials fled, he would go to Madrid and organise thousands of people to defend it himself. The confrontation led to Prieto's resignation as General Secretary.

=== Battle of Ciudad Universitaria ===
As the Nationalists closed in on the Spanish capital, the Rosal Column went to defend the city. At the suggestion of the CNT, general José Miaja appointed Mera to command the Rosal Column in the sector of Pozuelo de Alarcón. During the subsequent siege, members of the Rosal Column instinctively and immediately obeyed orders from military officers. Civilians brought them food and ammunition, and even joined the column to fight, at personal risk to their own lives. On 18 November, the Rosal Column arrived at the Battle of Ciudad Universitaria and reinforced the Durruti Column near the Hospital Clínico San Carlos, which was under Nationalist control. A dynamiters' captain from the Rosal Column noticed that the Nationalist forces left the hospital building at night and returned in the morning. At 04:00 on 19 November, they fired at the building, and when no returning fire came, they occupied the building and sang The Internationale in celebration. Later that morning, the Nationalists returned to the building through a tunnel which they had dug from the Casa de Velázquez. Fighting ensued, with many deaths on the side of the confederal militias, but the Nationalists eventually retreated back through the tunnel. The militias then returned to their barracks, where Buenaventura Durruti was fatally shot later that afternoon.

== Teruel Offensive ==
On 15 November, Francisco Largo Caballero appointed Jesús Velasco Echave, the commander of the Torres-Benedito Column, as commander-in-chief of the Teruel front. He was tasked with reorganising the militias in the region into a field army. The Rosal Column and Eixea-Uribes Column were the first columns to accept Velasco's authority. By this time, the CNT had accepted the militarisation of the militias and dispatched Miguel González Inestal to visit the front lines and attempt to convince the militia columns to accept their own dissolution into the Republican Army. He reported that it was difficult to convince the Rosal Column, but that when he spoke to the militiamen individually, many came to understand the need for an overarching command structure. The majority of the column, including Cipriano Mera himself, reluctantly accepted militarisation. Mera had previously been a staunch anti-militarist, only obeying orders that came from the CNT. But by December 1936, he came to believe that self-discipline was insufficient for the war effort and that military discipline needed to be imposed. In contrast, members of the Libertarian Youth, including Manuel Carabaño, staunchly opposed militarisation, believing that it violated anarchist principles of anti-militarism and that it would ultimately bring them under the control of the state.

On Christmas Day, 25 December 1936, Velasco launched an offensive against Teruel, directing the Rosal Column to capture Albarracín and Gea. The offensive continued over the subsequent days, but the militia columns only made small gains. On 28 December, the Rosal Column cut the road between the Teruel neighbourhoods of Campiello and Sant Blas, causing difficulties for the Nationalist occupiers in Albarracín. By the time the fighting ended on 13 January 1937, the Republican militias had killed 600 Nationalist soldiers, occupied Castralbo and Gea, and placed Albarracín under siege. According to military historian José Manuel Martínez Bande, the offensive had lacked substantial coordination, which resulted in relatively insignificant gains for the Republicans. At a plenum of confederal militia columns in early February 1937, a delegate for the CNT's 13th Column cited the Teruel offensive's lack of coordination, during which the Rosal Column had failed to achieve its objective, as a motivating factor in them accepting militarisation. At the plenum, Mera also signalled that the Rosal Column accepted militarisation, believing that the militias lacked the military discipline necessary to win the war. But he also insisted that the militarisation be carried out by the confederal militias themselves, rather than forming mixed brigades with Marxist commanders, which he worried would "spell the death of the CNT".

== Militarisation ==
The column continued to debate the issue of militarisation until one day in February 1937, when the military forcibly removed the column from its positions, loaded the militiamen onto lorries and took them to Cuenca. There they were told by the National Committee of the CNT that if they continued to oppose militarisation, then they would be expelled from the CNT. They were then granted leave on the condition that, if they returned, they would accept militarisation. As the majority of the column had already accepted militarisation, this convinced the rest to accept it too. Carabaño hoped that, through accepting military discipline, they would be able to establish a truly revolutionary army. Members of the column were subsequently appointed as officers in the new Popular Army of the Republic, with Carabaño himself becoming a lieutenant. Some of them refused the appointments, with one performatively rejecting his promotion to the rank of major by declaring: "Major of the mother who bore you! I'm a good anarchist." They also did not accept formal military regulations, refusing to wear uniforms, salute or enforce separation between officers and soldiers. But the members of the Rosal Column ultimately concluded that their militarisation was a necessary sacrifice to defend the Spanish Revolution.

The Rosal Column was reorganised into the 59th, 60th and 61st Mixed Brigades, and integrated into the 42nd Division. Some members of the Rosal Column were transferred to the 82nd Mixed Brigade and placed under the command of the Mexican communist David Alfaro Siqueiros, who reported that they were "romantically opposed" to military discipline. Cipriano Mera went on to lead the 14th Division of the Popular Army. In March 1937, he commanded the 14th Division at the Battle of Guadalajara, where he helped lead the Republican Army to victory. For his role in the battle, Mera was promoted to the rank of lieutenant colonel and given command of the IV Army Corps. Over the subsequent months, he increasingly struggled with his new position in the military hierarchy, culminating in July 1937, when he requested to be relieved of command during the Battle of Brunete. He eventually settled into his role, with González Inestal even reporting that he had come to have "too much" respect for militarisation.

Towards the end of the war, Rosal was appointed as military governor of the province of Tarragona. Mera later supported Segismundo Casado in the March 1939 coup, which overthrew the rule of the Communist Party of Spain (PCE). After the war, both went into exile, where they would die.

== Bibliography ==
- Alexander, Robert J. (1999). The Anarchists in the Spanish Civil War. Janus Publishing Company. ISBN 978-1-85756-400-6.
- Alpert, Michael (2013). The Republican Army in the Spanish Civil War, 1936–1939. Cambridge University Press. ISBN 978-1-107-02873-9.
- Alpert, Michael; Matthews, James (2021) [2019]. ""With Nothing But Our Bared Chests": Republican Armed Columns in the Militia Phase of the Spanish Civil War". In Matthews, James (ed.). Spain at War: Society, Culture and Mobilization, 1936-44. Bloomsbury Academic. pp. 15–32. ISBN 978-1-3501-9265-2.
- Bolloten, Burnett (1991). The Spanish Civil War: Revolution and Counterrevolution. University of North Carolina Press. ISBN 978-0-8078-1906-7.
- Brown, Henry (2023). ""¡Vivan las tribus!": persecution, resistance and anarchist agency in the Popular Army during the Spanish Civil War (1936-9)". Journal of Iberian and Latin American Studies. 29 (3): 357–379. doi:10.1080/14701847.2023.2282836.
- Evans, Danny (2018). Revolution and the State: Anarchism in the Spanish Civil War, 1936–1939. Routledge. ISBN 978-1-138-06314-3.
- Fraser, Ronald (1979). Blood of Spain: The Experience of Civil War, 1936-1939. Penguin Books. ISBN 0-7139-1085-2.
- Graham, Helen (2002). The Spanish Republic at War, 1936–1939. Cambridge University Press. ISBN 0-521-45932-X. OCLC 464890766.
- Matthews, James (2012). "Militarization and Wartime Conscription". Reluctant Warriors: Republican Popular Army and Nationalist Army Conscripts in the Spanish Civil War, 1936–1939. Oxford University Press. ISBN 978-0-19-965574-8.
- Mugnai, Bruno (2019). Foreign volunteers and International Brigades in the Spanish civil war (1936-39). Soldiershop. ISBN 9788893274524.
- de Quesada, Alejandro (2015). The Spanish Civil War 1936–39. Vol. 2. Osprey Publishing. ISBN 9781782007869.
- Ruiz, Julius (2014). The 'Red Terror' and the Spanish Civil War. Cambridge University Press. ISBN 978-1-107-05454-7.
- Paz, Abel (2006) [1996]. Durruti in the Spanish Revolution. Translated by Morse, Chuck. Edinburgh: AK Press. ISBN 1-904859-50-X. LCCN 2006920974. OCLC 482919277.
- Paz, Abel (2011). The Story of the Iron Column: Militant Anarchism in the Spanish Civil War. AK Press. ISBN 978-1-84935-064-8.
