= 60th Mixed Brigade =

- 60.ª Brigada Mixta
- Active: January 1937 – February 4, 1939
- Country: Spanish Republic
- Allegiance: Republican faction
- Branch: Spanish Republican Army
- Type: Infantry
- Size: Brigade
- Engagements: Spanish Civil War

The 60th Mixed Brigade was a unit of the Spanish Republican Army created during the Spanish Civil War.

== History ==
The unit was founded in January 1937 on the Teruel Front, created from forces of the Rosal Column. Its first commander was Dionisio Fernández López. As of June 1937, it was classified in the 42nd Division. It fought in the Battle of Albarracín, on July 5. On July 7, the 60th MB managed to enter the town, but the defenders had regrouped in the Cathedral, and the Republican brigade was unable to evict them. On July 14 it was forced to retreat hastily from Albarracín after the arrival of enemy reinforcements, and the 60th MB was relieved of operations due to heavy casualties. In December 1937 the unit was assigned to the strategic reserve of the Republican Army.

During the Aragón Offensive the brigade fought in the Battle of Lérida. By then it was attached to the 46th Division of "Valentín González". On March 31 it covered the outskirts of the city, from Camí de Malgovern to Les Colladres, but the next day it lost this position. After the fall of Lérida, the brigade was established in the sector of the Balaguer bridgehead.

On May 27, it left the Balaguer sector and was assigned to the 3rd Division of the 15th Army Corps, in preparation for its participation in the Ebro offensive. On July 26 it crossed the river 3 km south of Flix as part of the second wave of attack, cooperating with other forces in the capture of this town. Then it continued its advance towards the Sierra de la Fatarella and established its positions in front of Vilalba dels Arcs, the strong point of nationalist forces in the Ebro. It was there that its advance was halted. On August 22 it had to go south of the Gaeta Vertex to plug a gap in the Republican defensive line, which it achieved at the cost of suffering many casualties. A week later it was in the valley of Corbera, but its situation was so compromised that it had to be relieved by troops from the 45th International Division. On October 20, it was permanently withdrawn from the Republican bridgehead to undergo a reorganization, being concentrated in the area of Juncosa-Ulldemolins-Pobla de Ciérvoles.

When the Catalonia Offensive began at the end of December, the 60th MB went on to defend La Granadella, suffering a large number of casualties. On January 12, 1939, enemy pressure forced their withdrawal towards Alcover. Three days later the unit tried to maintain the defensive line over the Gayá River, north of the province of Tarragona, but to no avail. On January 24, it was located in Esplugues de Llobregat, but it was unable to maintain a defensive line or support the defense of Barcelona, from which it withdrew on January 26. It continued its withdrawal up the coastline, until February 4, when the 60th MB was dissolved and its last remains crossed the French border.

== Command ==
Commanders

- Dionisio Fernández López;
- José García Acevedo

Commissars

- Sófocles Parra Salmerón;
- Basilio Heredia Melendo

== See also ==
- Mixed Brigades
- Rosal Column

== Bibliography ==
- Alpert, Michael (1989). El Ejército Republicano en la Guerra Civil (in Spanish). Madrid: Siglo XXI de España. ISBN 84-3230-682-7.
- Álvarez, Santiago (1989). Los comisarios políticos en el Ejército Popular de la República (in Spanish). Ediciós do Castro.
- Engel Masoliver, Carlos (1999). Historia de las Brigadas Mixtas del Ejército Popular de la República (in Spanish). Madrid: Almena. ISBN 84-922644-7-0.
- Salas Larrazábal, Ramón (2000). Historia del Ejército Popular de la República (in Spanish). La Esfera de los Libros S.L. ISBN 84-9734-465-0.
