= Battle of Albarracín =

Battle of the Spanish Civil War

Coordinates: 40.405278°N 1.444167°W

- Part of the Spanish Civil War
Date	5 July – 11 August 1937
Location	Albarracín area and Montes Universales, Spain
Result	Nationalist victory

Belligerents
Spanish Republic	Nationalist Spain

Commanders and leaders
Unknown	Miguel Ponte; Fernando Barrón

Units involved
42nd Division	13th Division "Black Hand"

Strength
8,000–9,500	Unknown

Casualties and losses
High	Unknown

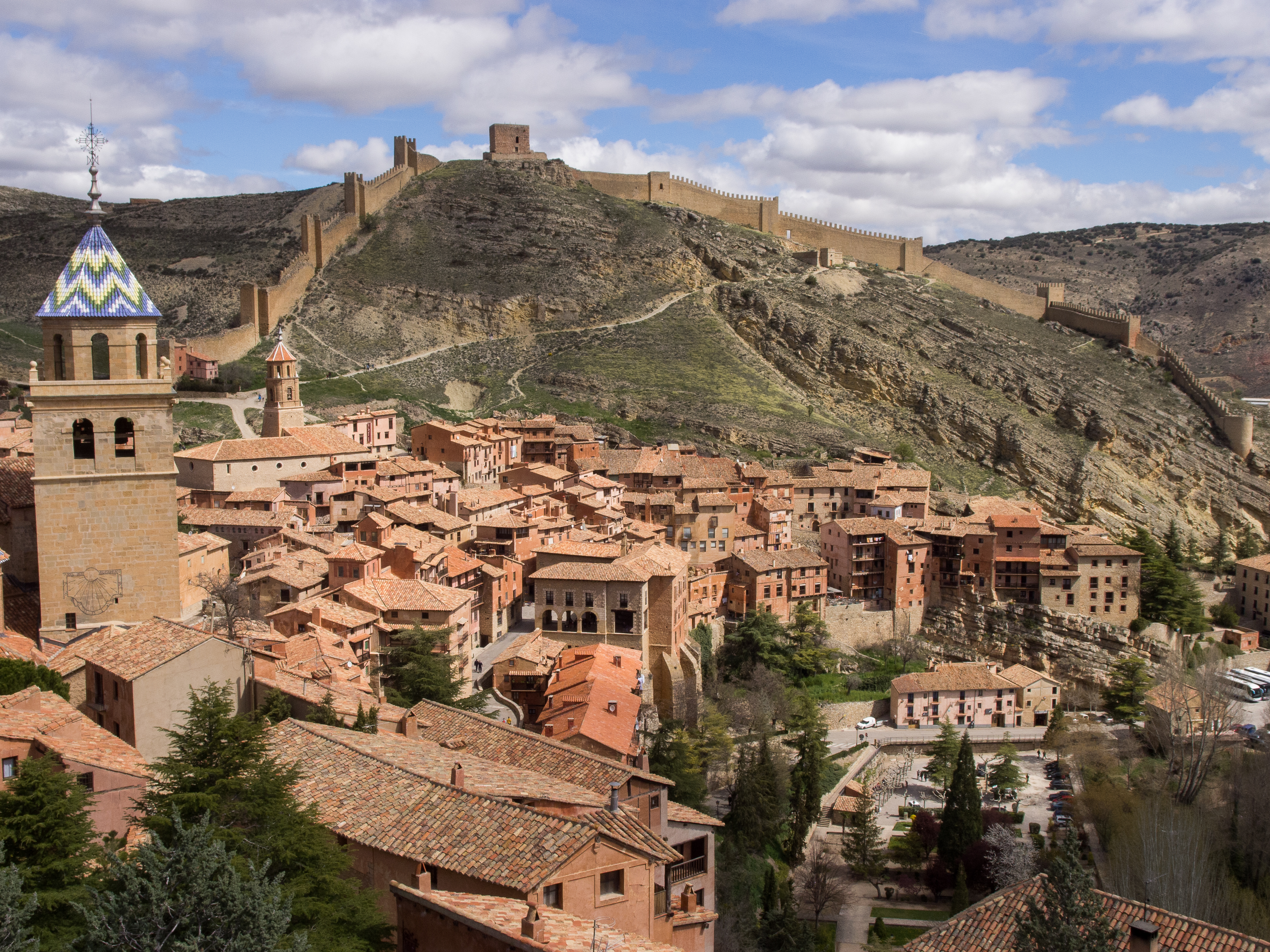
View of the Cathedral of Albarracín

The Battle of Albarracín took place in Albarracín and surrounding areas (Teruel) between 5 July and 11 August 1937, during the Spanish Civil War.

== Background ==
The Aragon front was, from the beginning of the war, a secondary front, but also a primary objective for the Republicans. The Nationalists maintained a weak position, defending a large line which stretched from the Pyrenees to the city of Teruel, and from there down to the Montes Universales and the birth of the Tagus. Thus, it was a tempting target to the numerically superior Republican troops, especially Huesca and Teruel, which were besieged. In order to support the Republican offensive at Brunete and to force the Nationalists to maintain their troops in this front, the Republicans in Aragon planned to launch a small offensive at Albarracín.

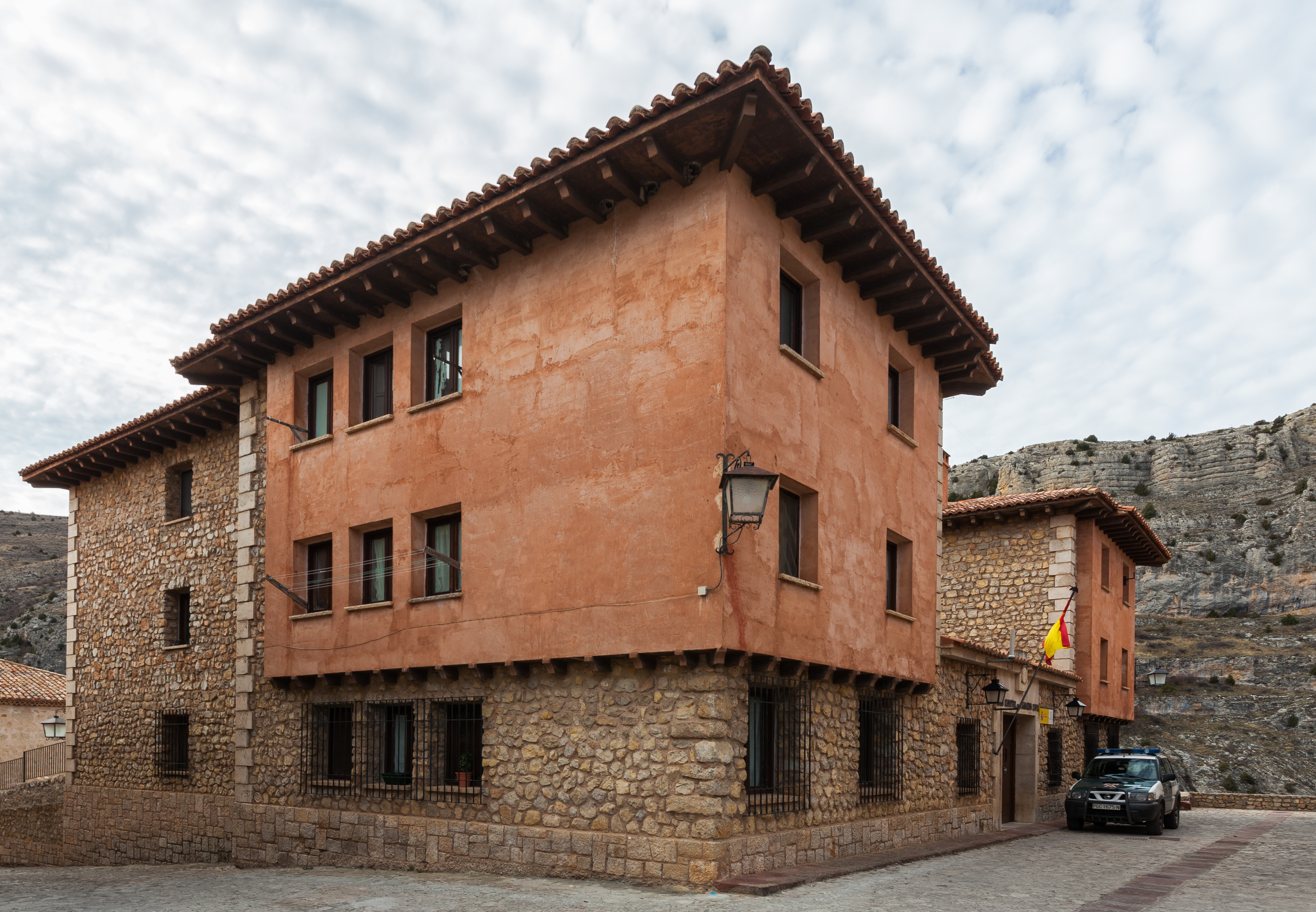
The Civil Guard Barracks in 2014

== Developments of the operations ==
=== Republican offensive ===
In rapid deployment on the heights that surround Albarracín, forces of the 42nd Republican Division took positions to attack the city. The town was weakly garrisoned, and the Republicans were in a commanding position.

On 5 July, the Republicans broke through enemy lines, and on the 7th, they entered the city. The city was conquered quickly and almost in its entirety, with the exceptions of two concentrated pockets of resistance in the barracks of the Guardia Civil and the cathedral, composed mostly of civilians with some Nationalist military support. The 60th mixed brigade did most of the operation, being supported by the other two brigades. On the other hand, the majority of the 59th Brigade was directed towards Gea de Albarracín to reinforce the positions, while the 61st brigade went to Monterde (which it took control of). After the Republican advance, most of the Francoist defenders took positions on the higher part of Albarracín while the Aviación Nacional bombarded the Republican enclaves; from this point on, the Republicans were on the defensive.

=== Nationalist Counterattack ===
The rebel forces, composed largely of units of the Legion and Moroccan Regulars, began their advance on the roads penetrating the Sierra de Albarracín Comarca. On 9 July, the Nationalist troops reorganized to form three columns under the command of General Miguel Ponte. The Republican troops received orders on 11 July to maintain their position in Albarracín at all costs and to wipe out the Francoist resistance, which remained in some of the buildings of the city, which had been without food or water since the 8th. The Nationalists mounted a counterattack which beat back Republicans, and on 14 July Ponte's troops broke through the Republican positions and retook Albarracín.

On the 16th, amid fierce Republican resistance (who were taking advantage of the area's terrain) and hard fighting, the Nationalists recovered all the positions they had lost at the beginning of the offensive.

Taking advantage of the momentum from the counterattack, the Nationalists moved towards the Montes Universales and again broke through the Republican resistance, which was unable to cope with the rebel advance, and on the 21st, the rebels took over several Republican towns. On 31 July, the Republican force disintegrated in the face of the Nationalist offensive, which continued through the Montes Universales. The Nationalists halted their advance, and military actions ended on 11 August.

== Result ==
The battle had little influence on either the Aragon front or the Battle of Brunete, although the nationalists moved forward a few kilometers and conquered some inhabitants, reinforcing their defensive positions on the southern flank of Teruel. This area remained fairly stable until the end of the war.

== See also ==
- List of Spanish Republican military equipment of the Spanish Civil War
- List of classes of Spanish Nationalist ships of the Spanish Civil War
