= Guadalaviar =

Guadalaviar, Spain
- municipality
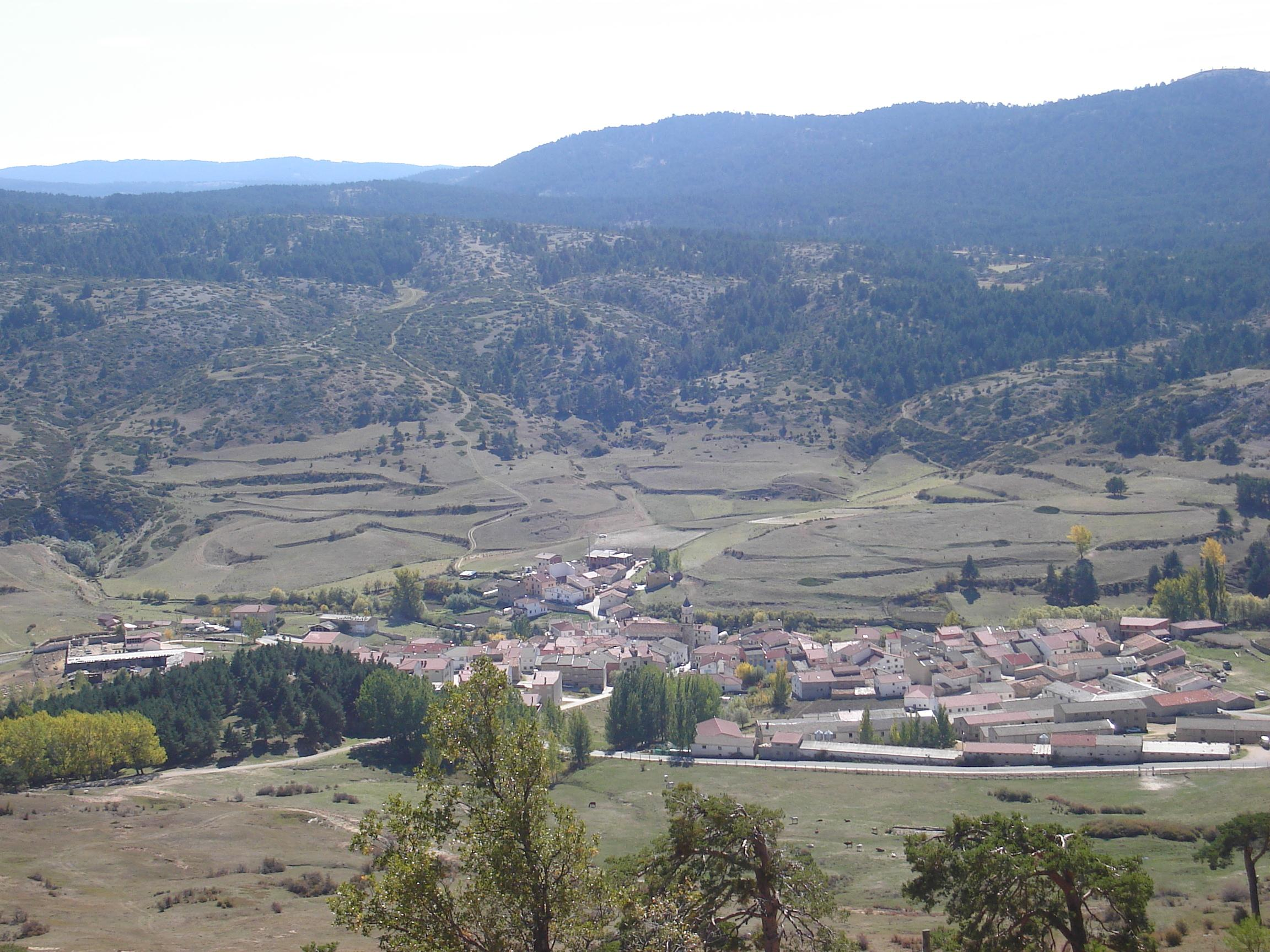

- Location within Spain
- Coordinates: 40°23′N 1°43′W
- Country: Spain
- Autonomous community: Aragon
- Province: Teruel

Area
  - Total: 28.08 km^{2} (10.84 sq mi)
- Elevation: 1,519 m (4,984 ft)

Population (2025-01-01)
  - Total: 238
  - Density: 8.48/km^{2} (22.0/sq mi)
- Time zone: UTC+1 (CET)
  - Summer (DST): UTC+2 (CEST)

Guadalaviar is a municipality located in the province of Teruel, Aragon, Spain. It has a population of 238 (register office, 2025).

== See also ==
- Montes Universales
- List of municipalities in Teruel
