= Griegos =

- municipality
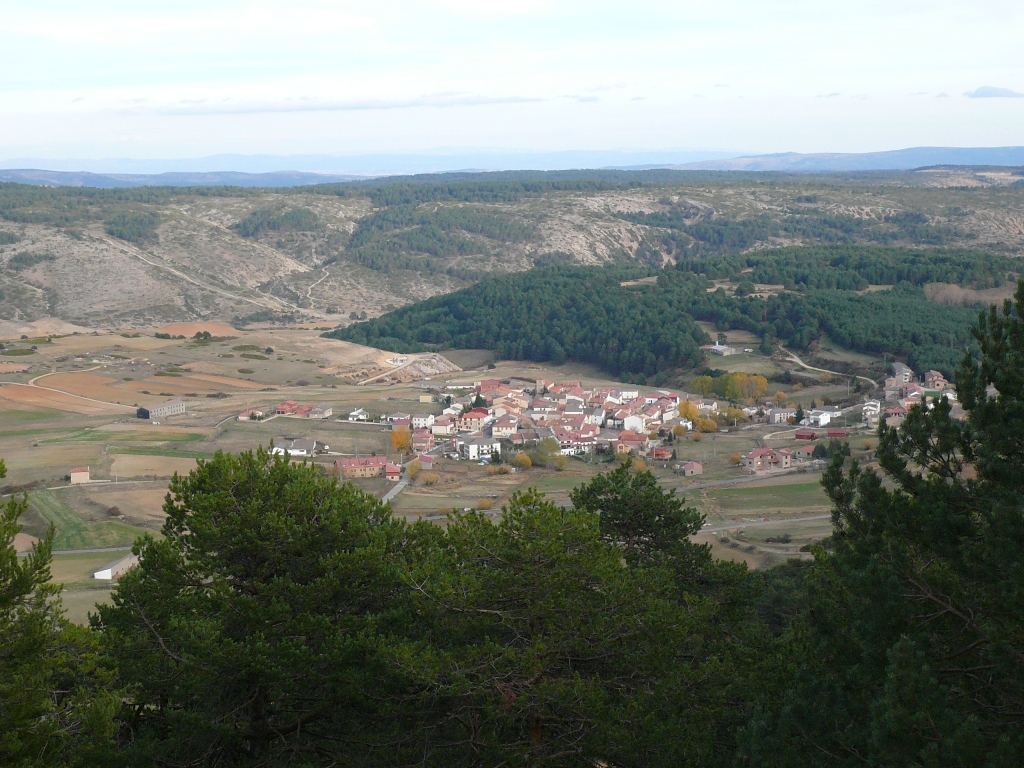

- Coat of arms

- Location within Spain
- Coordinates: 40°26′N 1°42′W
- Country: Spain
- Autonomous community: Aragon
- Province: Teruel

Area
  - Total: 31.47 km^{2} (12.15 sq mi)
- Elevation: 1,601 m (5,253 ft)

Population (2025-01-01)
  - Total: 154
  - Density: 4.89/km^{2} (12.7/sq mi)
- Time zone: UTC+1 (CET)
  - Summer (DST): UTC+2 (CEST)

Griegos is a municipality located in the province of Teruel, Aragon, Spain. According to the 2004 census (INE), the municipality has a population of 137 inhabitants.

The climate is continental Mediterranean, characterized by long, cold winters with little snow though, where temperatures can stay several days at -15 degrees Celsius or less. The summers are mild and some days it is possible to achieve zero temperatures in midsummer.

== See also ==
- Montes Universales
- List of municipalities in Teruel
