= 42nd Division (Spain) =

Unit of the Republican Army in the Spanish Civil War

42nd Division 42.ª División
- Standard of the 42nd Division
- Active: 13 April 1937–9 February 1939
- Country: Spain
- Branch: Spanish Republican Army
- Type: Infantry division
- Role: Home Defence
- Part of: Cuenca Autonomous Group (1937); 13th Army Corps (1937 - 1938); 15th Army Corps (1938)
- Engagements: Spanish Civil War: Montes Universales; Battle of Alfambra; Battle of the Ebro

Commanders
- Notable commanders: Manuel Álvarez Álvarez ("Manolín"); Antonio Ortiz Roldán

Map of Spain in November 1938. In pink the two regions under Republican control.

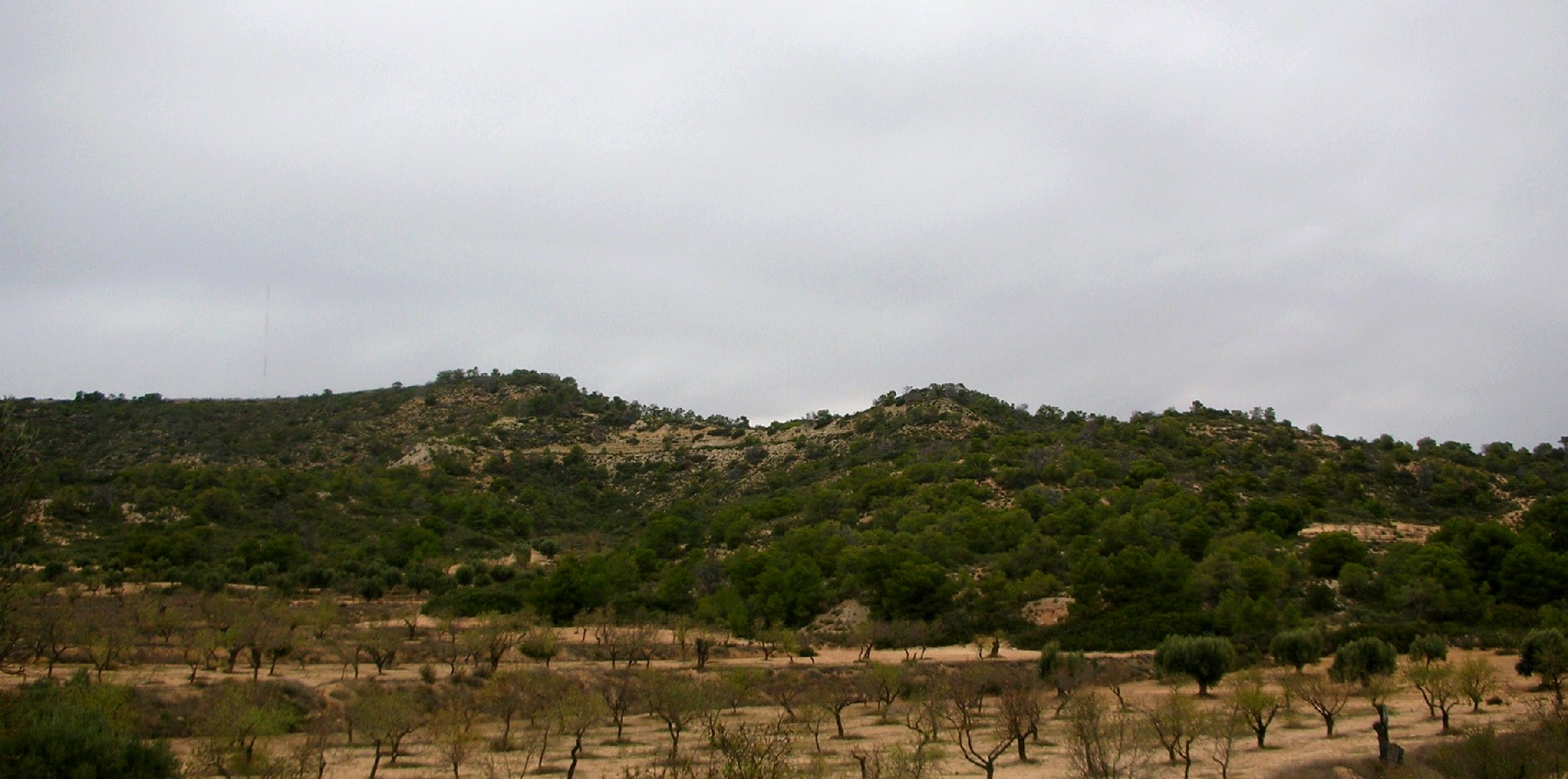
The desolate Auts Hills, limit of the republican advance in the northern zone, where a great number of men of the 42nd Division perished.

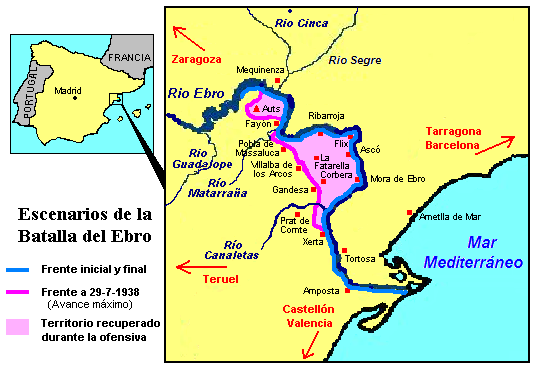
Map of the Battle of the Ebro showing the two pockets.

The 42nd Division (Spanish: 42.ª División) was a division of the Spanish Republican Army in the Spanish Civil War.

This unit was involved in the Battle of Alfambra —part of the Battle of Teruel, as well as in the Battle of the Ebro, suffering grievous losses in both battles.

== History ==
This unit was established on 13 April 1937 at the Teruel Front. Initially it was the Cuenca Autonomous Group (Spanish: Agrupación autónoma de Cuenca) led by Infantry Colonel Víctor Lacalle Seminario, which besides the 59th, 59th and 60th Mixed Brigades, had the 49th Mixed Brigade in the reserve. In June the division was made part of the Teruel Operations Army (Spanish: Ejército de Operaciones de Teruel), which was formed by the 39th, 40th, 41st and 42nd divisions under the command of Colonel Jesús Velasco Echave.

=== Battles of Albarracín and Alfambra ===
Between 5 July and 11 August 1937, the 42nd Division was involved in the Battle of Albarracín, which was an operation launched by the Republican high command in the Albarracín and the Montes Universales area of the rugged Iberian System. After an initial easy victory the rebels reacted and soon launched a counteroffensive which put the loyalists on the defensive. On July 16 despite a fierce republican resistance that took advantage of the mountainous terrain, the Francoists recovered all the positions they had lost at the beginning of the offensive. Then they advanced relentlessly towards the line of the Montes Universales range, located between Cuenca and Teruel Provinces. The already broken republican resistance was unable to face the Francoist onslaught and retreated, so that on 21 July the rebel forces conquered several villages that had formerly been within republican territory. By the 31 July the 42nd Division continued its disorderly withdrawal from its defensive positions in the Montes Universales before the unabating advance of the rebel counteroffensive.

The 42nd Division took part in the Battle of Alfambra between 5 and 8 February 1938. It was in the vanguard position, with the 27th and the 39th division in the flanks. The latter two units were veteran and battle-hardened, but were badly depleted in men and materiel. Towards the rear were the 19th, still lacking combat experience, as well as the 66 Division. All the republican units arrayed for the battle had at their disposal very few pieces of artillery and less than half the men than the attacking rebel troops. The battle by the Alfambra River ended in disaster for the Republican Army and the 42nd Division took the brunt of the losses, ending up with very heavy casualties.

=== Battle of the Ebro ===
The Battle of the Ebro would be the scenario where the 42nd Division had its worst battle experience. At the onset of the operation, and in order to distract the enemy's attention, the river Ebro was crossed from different places by Republican Army units. One of these was launched north of the main crossing area of the XV Army Corps by the 42nd Division. On 25 July 1938 its 9,500 men crossed the river between Mequinenza and Fayón. They were able to establish a bridgehead and, moving quickly, the troops of the division reached the Auts Hills, capturing a rebel infantry regiment of the Moroccan Army Corps which surrendered without putting up a fight. The men of the division cut the road between Fayón to the south and Mequinenza to the north, but were unable to conquer any of the two towns because of the powerful reaction of the rebels and the lack of artillery support. On the following day, the 26 July, the division was subject to an intense attack in the form of bombardment from the air and artillery fire from the enemy positions to the east. Hence the 42nd Division's swift advance was stopped and its hapless brigades became bogged in a 15 km wide northern pocket bound by the river on the rear and cut off from the rest of the units engaged in the Ebro Offensive. Although it had been initially hailed as a victory, the division's occupation of the Auts revealed itself as a failure. Harassed by constant fire, the units of the 42nd Division endured multiple casualties from well-placed Moroccan snipers, as well as Aviación Nacional aerial fire. Finally, on 6 August the troops withdrew from the hills and crossed back the river —still being fired upon, an operation which was completed the following day.

The much worn-out division gathered at La Pobla de Massaluca in order to be reorganized. On 14 September it crossed the Ebro again at another spot in order to relieve the forces of the 3rd Division in the Serra de Cavalls range. Its positions endured very hard attacks from the enemy between the 8 and 20 October that finally forced the division to withdraw, losing Miravet on 5 November, Benissanet the following day, and Móra d'Ebre on the 8 November, camping at Mount Picossa before crossing again the Ebro River. Finally it reached Ascó on 12 November where, after a great number of casualties, it had to abandon the bridgehead.

=== Withdrawal across Catalonia and extinction ===
Following the defeat at the Battle of the Ebro the 42nd Division gathered at La Granadella in order to be restructured. But on 23 December, while it was in that town and had not fully recovered from its tremendous losses, the rebel Catalonia Offensive began and the unit found itself overwhelmed. While withdrawing northwards across the mountainous region of the Serra de Prades and Serra de la Llena, it fought against the advancing rebels. Moving northeastwards it reached Vinaixa on 5 January, where it tried to protect the road junction against attacks, but which it lost the following day. Finally the division abandoned the Priorat region moving north before the inexorable enemy advance and reached the Gaià River line, where it attempted to put up a strong line of defense. But again it was unsuccessful and continued fleeing northwards across the Penedès.

By 21 January the division assembled at Molins de Rei, near Barcelona, but it did not enter the city which it skirted to the west, along Vallvidrera and the Tibidabo, where it tried again to set up defenses, but which were lost to the enemy on 26 January. During its withdrawal the division suffered the loss of many men, especially owing to the desertion of the recent recruits. The remaining troops gathered on 2 February to the south of the road from Vidreres to Lloret and moved north. Again, on 7 February a line of defense was tried at the banks of the Fluvià River, but the rebel advance was relentless and the last remainder of the division withdrew, reaching the Muga River and moving on, crossing the French border at Port Bou on 9 February. Once in France the 42nd Division was extinguished as its men were disarmed and interned in concentration camps by the French authorities.

== Order of Battle ==
Date	Army Corps	Mixed Brigades	Battlefront
April 1937	Cuenca Autonomous Group	59th, 60th and 61st	Montes Universales
December 1937	13th Army Corps	59th, 61st and 150th	Alfambra
25 July 1938	15th Army Corps	226th, 227th and 59th	Ebro

== Leaders ==
Commanders

- Colonel Víctor Lacalle Seminario;
- Militia Major Marcelo Hernández Sáez;
- Lt. Colonel Julio Michelena Lluch;
- Militia Major Manuel Álvarez Álvarez;
- Militia Major Antonio Ortiz Roldán;

Commissars

- Pedro López Calle, member of the CNT;
- José Fernández Herrador, member of the Spanish Communist Party (PCE);

== See also ==
- Mixed Brigades

== Bibliography ==
- Alpert, Michael (1989). El Ejército Republicano en la Guerra Civil. Madrid: Siglo XXI de España. ISBN 978-84-323-0682-2.
- Álvarez, Santiago (1989). Los comisarios políticos en el Ejército Popular de la República. Ediciós do Castro.
- Engel Masoliver, Carlos (1999). Historia de las Brigadas mixtas del Ejército popular de la República, 1936-1939. Madrid: Editorial Almena. ISBN 84-96170-19-5.
- Salas Larrazábal, Ramón (2006). Historia del Ejército Popular de la República. La Esfera de los Libros S.L. ISBN 84-9734-465-0.
- Téllez, Antonio (1992). Sabaté. Guerrilla urbana en España (1945-1960). Virus.
- Thomas, Hugh (1976). Historia de la Guerra Civil Española. Barcelona: Círculo de Lectores. ISBN 84-226-0874-X.
