= Villar del Cobo =

- municipality
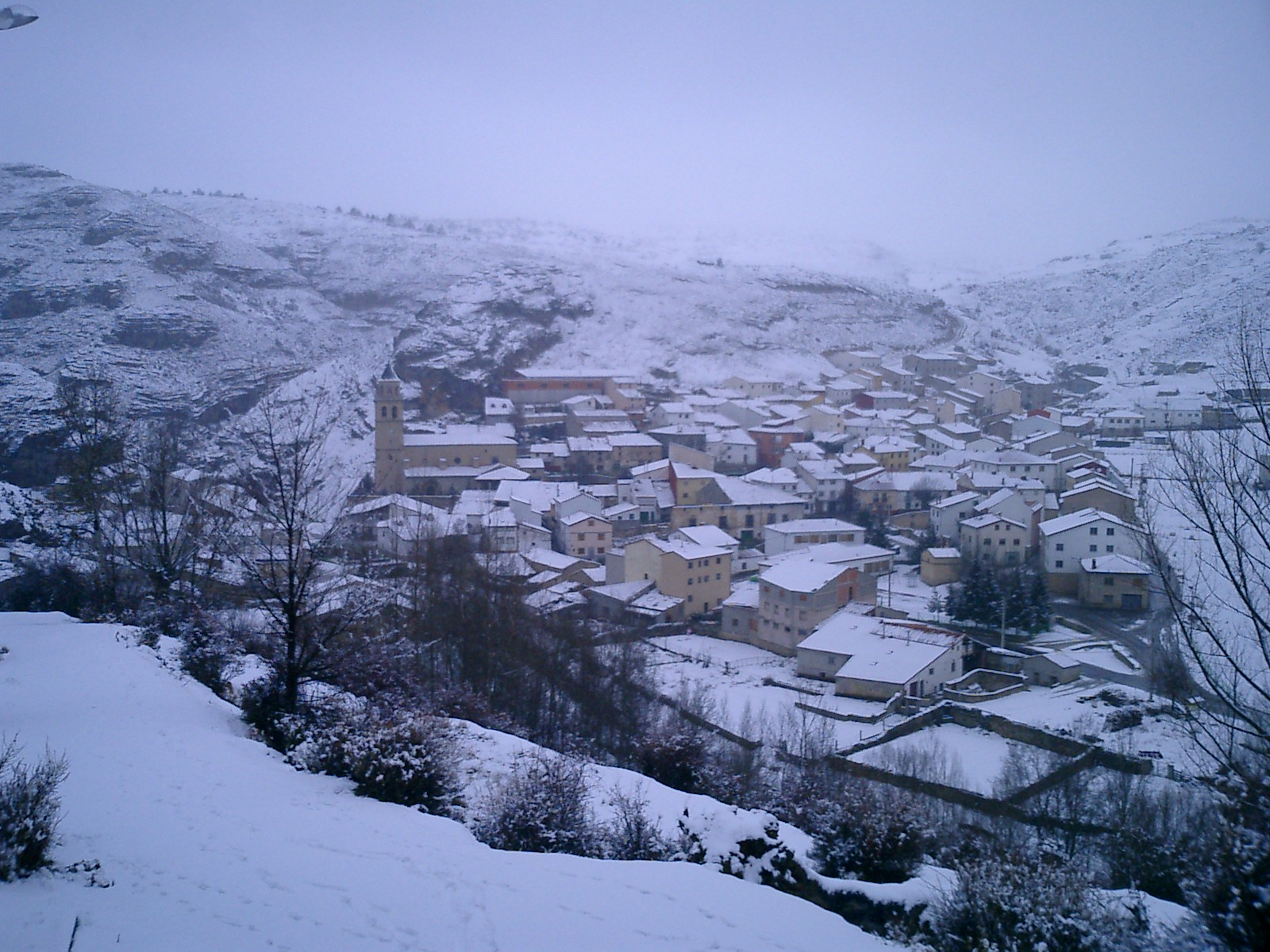

- Location within Spain
- Coordinates: 40°24′N 1°40′W
- Country: Spain
- Autonomous community: Aragon
- Province: Teruel

Area
  - Total: 54.13 km^{2} (20.90 sq mi)

Population (2025-01-01)
  - Total: 158
  - Density: 2.92/km^{2} (7.56/sq mi)
- Time zone: UTC+1 (CET)
  - Summer (DST): UTC+2 (CEST)

Villar del Cobo is a municipality located in the province of Teruel, Aragon, Spain. According to the 2004 census (INE), the municipality had a population of 222 inhabitants.

== See also ==
- Montes Universales
- List of municipalities in Teruel
