= Pedro López Calle =

Andalusian anarchist

- Born: 1902; Montejaque, Málaga, Andalusia
- Died: 1977 (aged 74–75); Algeciras, Cádiz, Andalusia
- Military career
- Service: Confederal militias (1936-1937); Spanish Republican Army (1937-1939)
- Service years: 1936–1939
- Units: Pedro López Column (1936–1937); 42nd Division (1937–1938); 61st Mixed Brigade (1938–1939)
- Conflicts: Spanish Civil War: Battle of Málaga

Pedro López Calle (Montejaque, 1902 - Algeciras, 1977) was an Andalusian anarchist.

== Biography ==
Born in Montejaque in 1902, (Note: Although other sources indicate that he was born in 1899 or 1904.) He was a prominent anarchist militant in Andalusia and a member of the CNT. A friend and collaborator of Antonio Rosado, in 1919 they both launched the anarchist newspaper "Juventud Rebelde" in Morón. He eventually was elected mayor of Montejaque, during the period of the Second Spanish Republic.

After the outbreak of the Civil War, he led the confederal militias of Ronda. Later he commanded the «Pedro López» column, which acted in the area of San Pedro de Alcántara. A small column, made up of anarchist militiamen, it resisted the nationalist forces and also began repression against the right-wing in the towns of the Serranía de Ronda. (Note: The column had its own newspaper, El Miliciano, and became well known in the area.) At the beginning of 1937, after the conquest of Malaga by the nationalists, he withdrew with his forces to Almería. Later he became part of the political commissariat of the People's Army of the Republic. He came to serve as commissar of the 42nd Division and of the 61st Mixed Brigade.

At the end of the war he went into exile in France, where he was interned in various concentration camps. Later he moved to Latin America, residing in Venezuela and Mexico. During his stay in the latter country, he collaborated with several anarchist publications, such as "Acción". Later he also resided in Oran and Morocco.

He returned to Spain after Franco's death, and he died in Algeciras in 1977.

== Family ==
His brother Bernabé, Civil Guard by profession, would be a prominent leader of the Maquis in Cádiz.

== Bibliography ==
- Álvarez, Santiago (1989). Los comisarios políticos en el Ejército Popular de la República (in Spanish). Ediciós do Castro.
- Engel, Carlos (1999). Historia de las Brigadas Mixtas del Ejército Popular de la República (in Spanish). Madrid: Almena. ISBN 84-922644-7-0.
- Prieto Borrego, Lucía (2007). Población y guerra civil en Málaga. Caída, éxodo y refugio (in Spanish). Diputación Provincial de Málaga.
- Sody de Rivas, Ángel (2003). Antonio Rosado y el anarcosindicalismo andaluz: Morón de la Frontera, 1868–1978 (in Spanish). Ediciones Carena.
- Téllez, Juan José (2014). Yanitos. Viaje al corazón de Gibraltar (1713–2013) (in Spanish). Centro de Estudios Andaluces.
