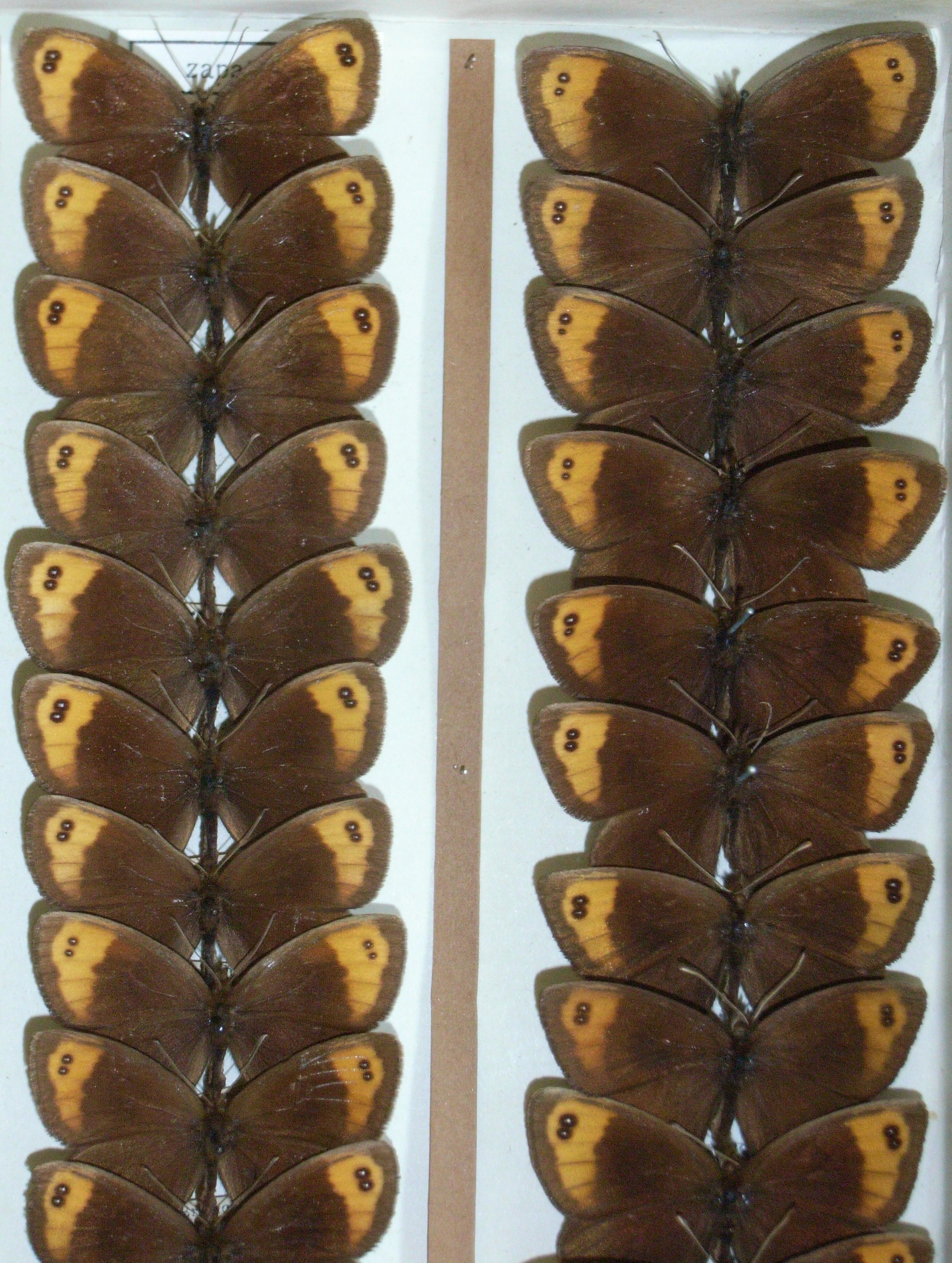
- Specimens from Spain (Langham collection - Ulster Museum)

Scientific classification
- Kingdom: Animalia
- Phylum: Arthropoda
- Class: Insecta
- Order: Lepidoptera
- Family: Nymphalidae
- Genus: Erebia
- Species: E. zapateri

Binomial name
- Erebia zapateri (Oberthür, 1875)

= Zapater's ringlet =

Species of butterfly

Zapater's ringlet (Erebia zapateri) is a member of the subfamily Satyrinae of the family Nymphalidae. It is found only in the Montes Universales mountain range in east central Spain at more than 1,300 m above sea level in open forests.

== Description ==
The Aragonese Ringlet is a small dark brown butterfly with a wide orange postdiscal band cut by veins on the forewings and two twin or single ocelli with white pupils at the apex plus another vestigial one in e2. The hindwings have a postdiscal line of orange spots centered with discreet ocelli. The underside of the forewing is similar brown to copper and yellow to orange band bearing twin or single ocelli, while the underside of the hindwings is mottled brown with a well-defined lighter postdiscal band.

== Biology ==
Flight period and hibernation The imago flies from the end of July to the beginning of September . The caterpillars' host plants are thought to be Poa species. It is only present in eastern Spain in altitude areas between 1000 and 1600 meters. It resides in the grassy clearings of pine and oak forests.

== Protection ==
It is classified as Least Concern (LC) on the red data book
