= Miguel Ponte =

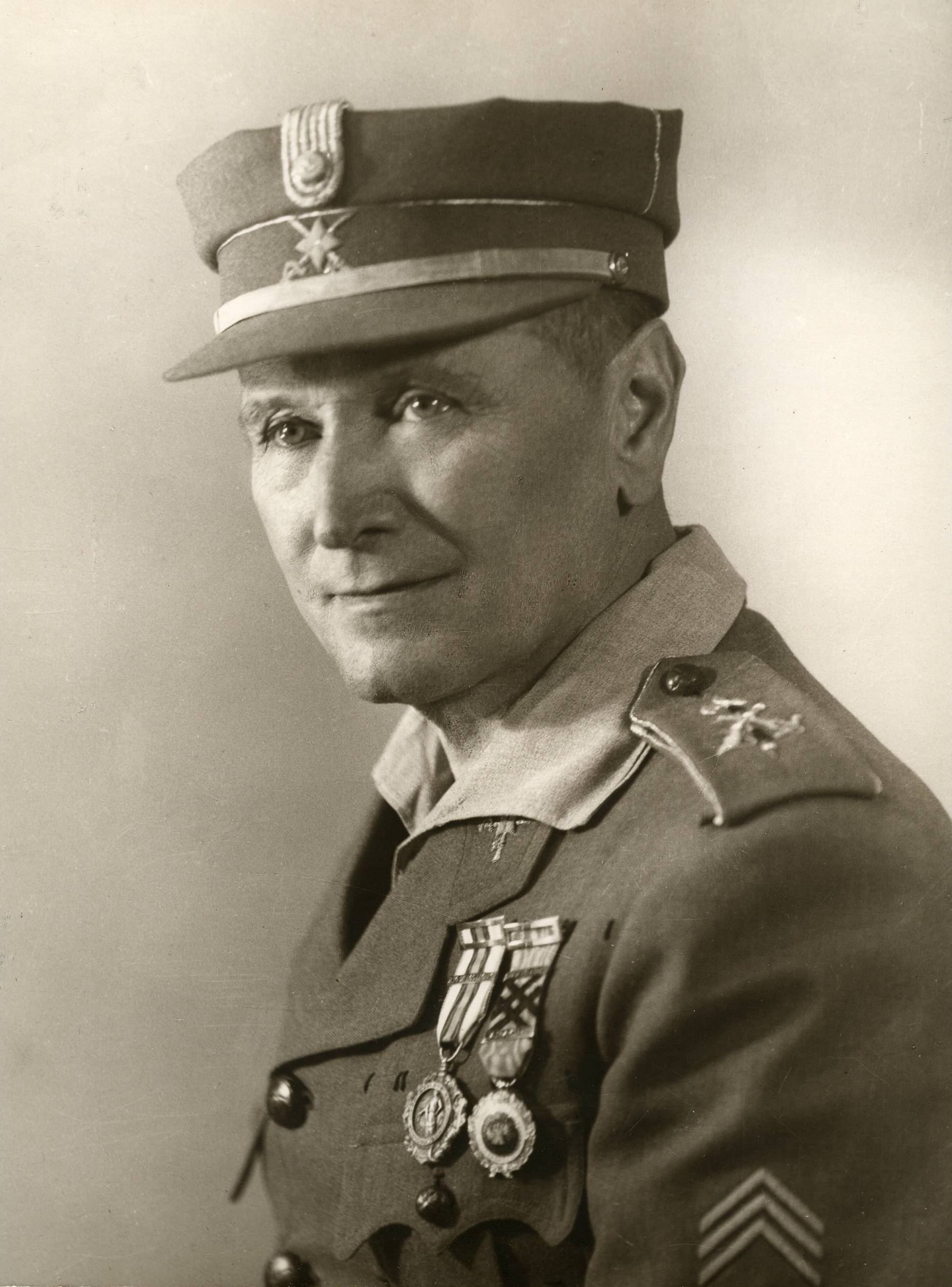
General Miguel Ponte

Luis Miguel Limia Ponte y Manso de Zúñiga, 8th Marqués de Bóveda de Limia (1882–1952) was a Spanish military leader who participated in the military uprising against the Second Spanish Republic which developed into the Spanish Civil War. He was a member of the National Defense Junta and held the position of Chief of State of the Nationalist faction between July 24 and October 3, 1936, and held the rank of Lieutenant General.

== Biography ==
An aristocrat and landowner, in 1924 he was a colonel of cavalry. In 1931, when the Second Spanish Republic was proclaimed, serving as Brigadier General, he requested his retirement from active duty. On August 10, 1932, Ponte participated in the failed coup d'état of José Sanjurjo, and in the face of defeat, fled to Portugal.

Upon the 1936 Coup, he collaborated with General Andrés Saliquet to assume control of Military Region VII (which corresponded to Valladolid). During the war, he was in charge of the 5th Infantry Division and later the Commander in Chief of Corps I and V of the rebel army.

Three months after the end of the war, on July 4, 1939, he was appointed Commander-in-Chief of the Balearic Islands, but he did not take up his post until a month later, on August 7th. A few days later, on the 16th of that month, he was appointed Chief of the Military Forces in Morocco. Coinciding with his promotion to Lieutenant General, on April 12, 1940, he was appointed Commanding General of the Army of Morocco, headquartered in Ceuta. He remained in this post until May 5, 1941, when he was transferred to Seville as Captain General of the 2nd Military Region and Commander of the Army Corps of Andalusia.

In December 1942 he paid a visit to Gibraltar. He arrived by car and crossed the frontier, and he inspected a British Guard of Honour. He was accompanied throughout his visit by British Lieutenant-General Noel Mason-MacFarlane. The General with Major-General Sir Colin Jardine and Major R Capurro, aide-de-camp to His Excellency. They saw the firing practice with Valentine tanks.

Ponte was a procurador (see Deputy (legislator)) of the Cortes in 1943 and 1949, in addition to being President of the Supreme Council of Military Justice. On April 8, 1950, he retired.
He was decorated on several occasions, including seven for combat actions in Africa before 1936 and six during the Spanish Civil War. He also received other honors, both civilian and military, especially after 1939.

He died on January 5, 1952, in Mahón (Menorca).
