= Battle of Alfambra =

1938 battle of the Spanish Civil War

Coordinates: 40.3453°N 1.1231°W

- Part of the Spanish Civil War
Date	5–7 February 1938
Location	Teruel, Aragon, Spain
Result	Nationalist victory

Belligerents
Spanish Republic	Nationalist Spain; Italy; Germany

Commanders and leaders
(Second Spanish Republic) General Juan Hernández Saravia	(Spain) Rafael García Valiño (Spain) Colonel Juan Yagüe (Spain) General Antonio Aranda (Spain) Colonel Jose Monasterio (Spain) General Juan Vigon

Strength
Fewer than 50,000; 120 fighters 80 bombers	100,000; 500 guns 150 fighters 100 bombers

Casualties and losses
20,000–22,000	?

The Battle of Alfambra took place near Alfambra from 5 to 8 February 1938, during the Spanish Civil War, and was a part of the Battle of Teruel. After the conquest of Teruel by the Republican army, the Nationalists started a counteroffensive in order to reocuppy Teruel. On 5 February, a huge Nationalist force broke the republican lines north of Teruel towards the Alfambra River, took 7,000 republican prisoners and threatened the Republican forces in Teruel.

== Background ==
After the conquest of Teruel by the Republican army on 7 January, the Nationalists started an offensive to conquest the high ground around Teruel on 17 January and occupied the heights of La Muela. Nevertheless, the Republican troops, led by Hernandez Saravia and backed by the International Brigades, stopped the Nationalist offensive on 27 January. Then, the Nationalists concentrated an army of 100,000 men and 500 guns in the Sierra de Palomera in the north of Teruel, led by General Juan Vigon, with three Army Corps (Aranda’s Galicia corps, Yagüe's Morocco corps and the Garcia Valiño’s Navarre Corp), the Italian CTV and Monasterio’s cavalry division.

On the other hand, the Republican defences in this part of the front were weak since they had never seen action, and most of the Republican troops were concentrated in the city of Teruel The Republican Army had one corps, the 13th Army Corps, with the 29th and the 42nd Divisions.

== Battle ==
On 5 February, launched a major offensive towards the Alfambra River, along a front of 30 km. The attack started with a massive cavalry charge of the Monasterio’s division, the last great mounted charge in Western Europe. The three Nationalist army corps broke the Republican lines and advanced swiftly towards the Alfambra. The Republican forces were surrounded by the nationalists or fled in disorder. By 7 February, the Nationalists had conquered 500 square miles (1,300 km^{2}) and huge amounts of material (munitions, weapons and ambulances), and aircraft (twelve on 7 February alone). The Republicans had suffered 20,000 to 22,000 casualties, among them 7,000 prisoners.

== Aftermath ==
By 20 February, the Republican communications to Valencia from Teruel had become threatened by the Nationalists, and Hernandez Saravia gave orders to withdraw from the city although the Republicans managed to form a defence line along the right bank of the Alfambra on 25 February.

== See also ==
- List of Spanish Nationalist military equipment of the Spanish Civil War
- List of weapons of the Corpo Truppe Volontarie
- List of Spanish Republican military equipment of the Spanish Civil War

== Bibliography ==
- Beevor, Antony. The Battle for Spain. The Spanish civil war, 1936-1939. Penguin Books. 2006. London. ISBN 978-0-14-303765-1.
- Thomas, Hugh. The Spanish Civil War. Penguin Books. 2001. London. ISBN 978-0-14-101161-5
