= Monterde =

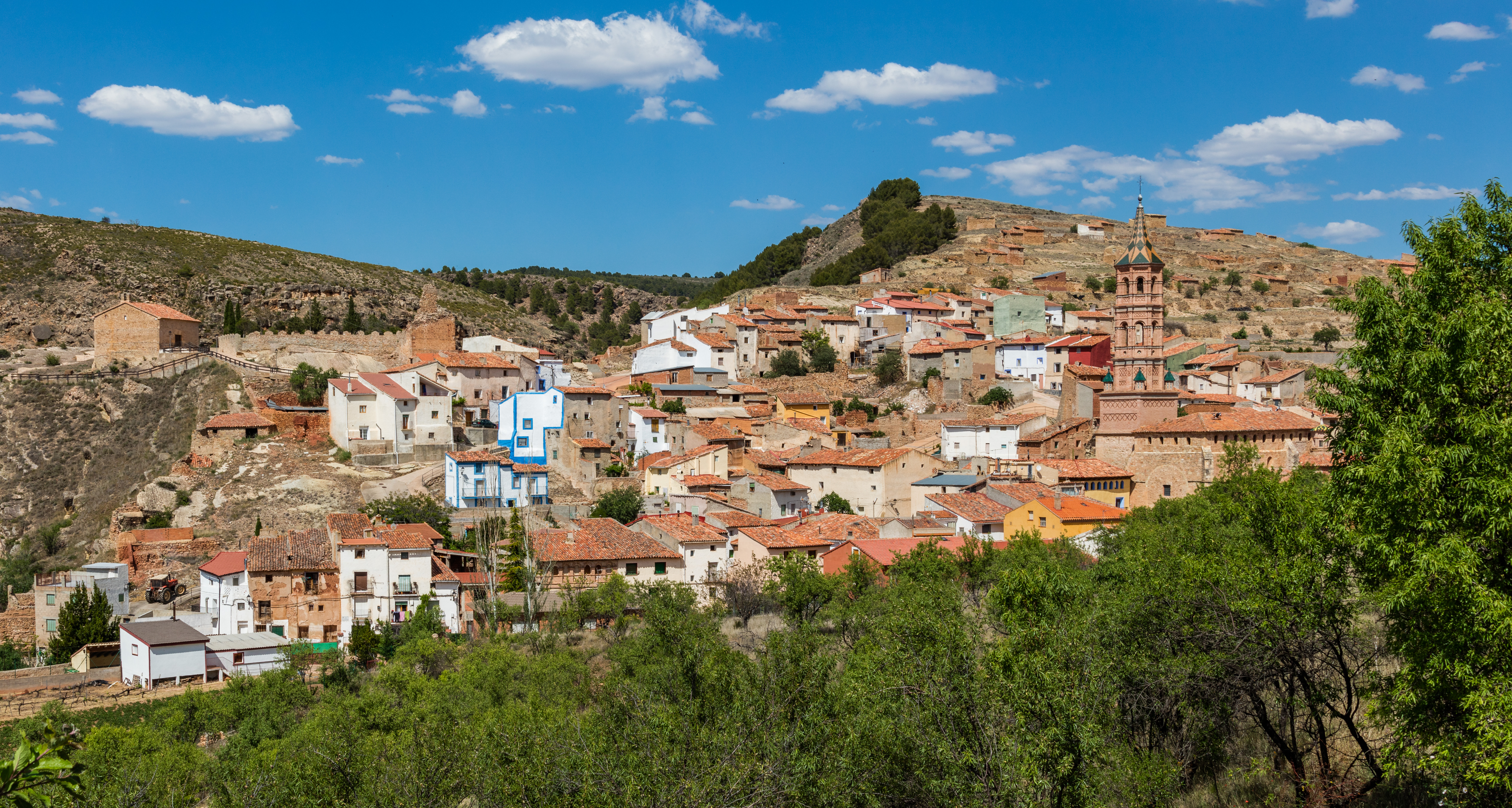

- Flag Coat of arms

- Location within Spain
- Coordinates: 41.1833°N 1.7333°W
- Country: Spain
- Autonomous community: Aragon
- Province: Zaragoza
- Comarca: Comunidad de Calatayud

Area
  - Total: 56 km^{2} (22 sq mi)

Population (2025-01-01)
  - Total: 143
  - Density: 2.6/km^{2} (6.6/sq mi)
- Time zone: UTC+1 (CET)
  - Summer (DST): UTC+2 (CEST)

Monterde is a municipality located in the province of Zaragoza, Aragon, Spain. According to the 2010 census, the municipality had a population of 194 inhabitants. Its postal code is 50213.

== See also ==
- Comunidad de Calatayud
- List of municipalities in Zaragoza
