= Alfambra =

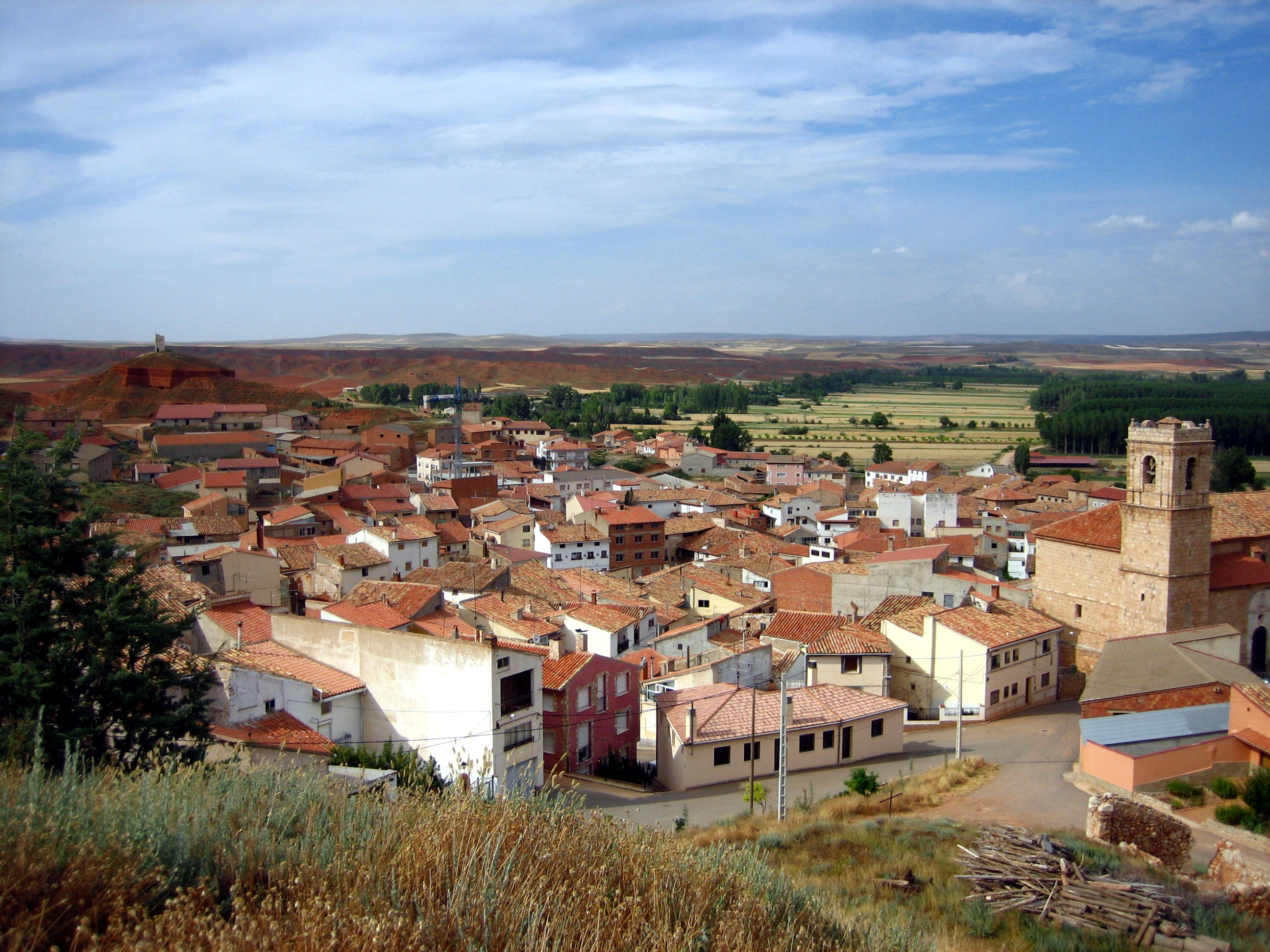

- Flag Coat of arms

- Location in Spain.
- Coordinates: 40°33′N 1°2′W
- Country: Spain
- Autonomous community: Aragon
- Province: Teruel
- Comarca: Comunidad de Teruel

Government
  - Mayor: Villamón Amador Martinez

Area
  - Total: 122.44 km^{2} (47.27 sq mi)

Population (2025-01-01)
  - Total: 485
  - Density: 3.96/km^{2} (10.3/sq mi)
- Demonym: Alfambrinos
- Time zone: UTC+1 (CET)
  - Summer (DST): UTC+2 (CEST)
- Website: Official website

Alfambra is a municipality located in the province of Teruel, Aragon, Spain. As of 2010, the municipality has a population of 676 inhabitants.

This locality is famous for the Battle of Alfambra fought in 1938 during the Spanish Civil War

== Historical Origins ==
It can be argued that Alfambra and its immediate surroundings have been inhabited since the Bronze Age, as shown by the archaeological remains found in deposits of Peña Dorada and El Castillo.

But it can also be argued that Alfambra truly began with the Muslim rule. In fact, its name is of Muslim origin: al-hamra, meaning "the red [town]", in reference to the deep reaching red clay on which the town sits. There is a castle that is known to exist from this period, Razin domain Banu and according to many authors, it is the most important in Southern Aragon. There is not much left of the castle, but some interesting results of the excavations can be found in the local museum.

Reconquered by Alfonso II in 1169, it was endowed in the 1174 Forum and delivered to the recently founded Military Order of the Holy Redeemer, also called Montegaudio. From 1196 until its dissolution, it became a commandery of the Knights Templar.

Between 1488 and 1495 it belonged to the sobrecullida of Teruel, and from that moment on the path of Teruel (1646) and the district of Teruel (1711-1833).

== See also ==
- List of municipalities in Teruel
