= Albarracín Cathedral =

- Cathedral of the Saviour
- Catedral del Salvador
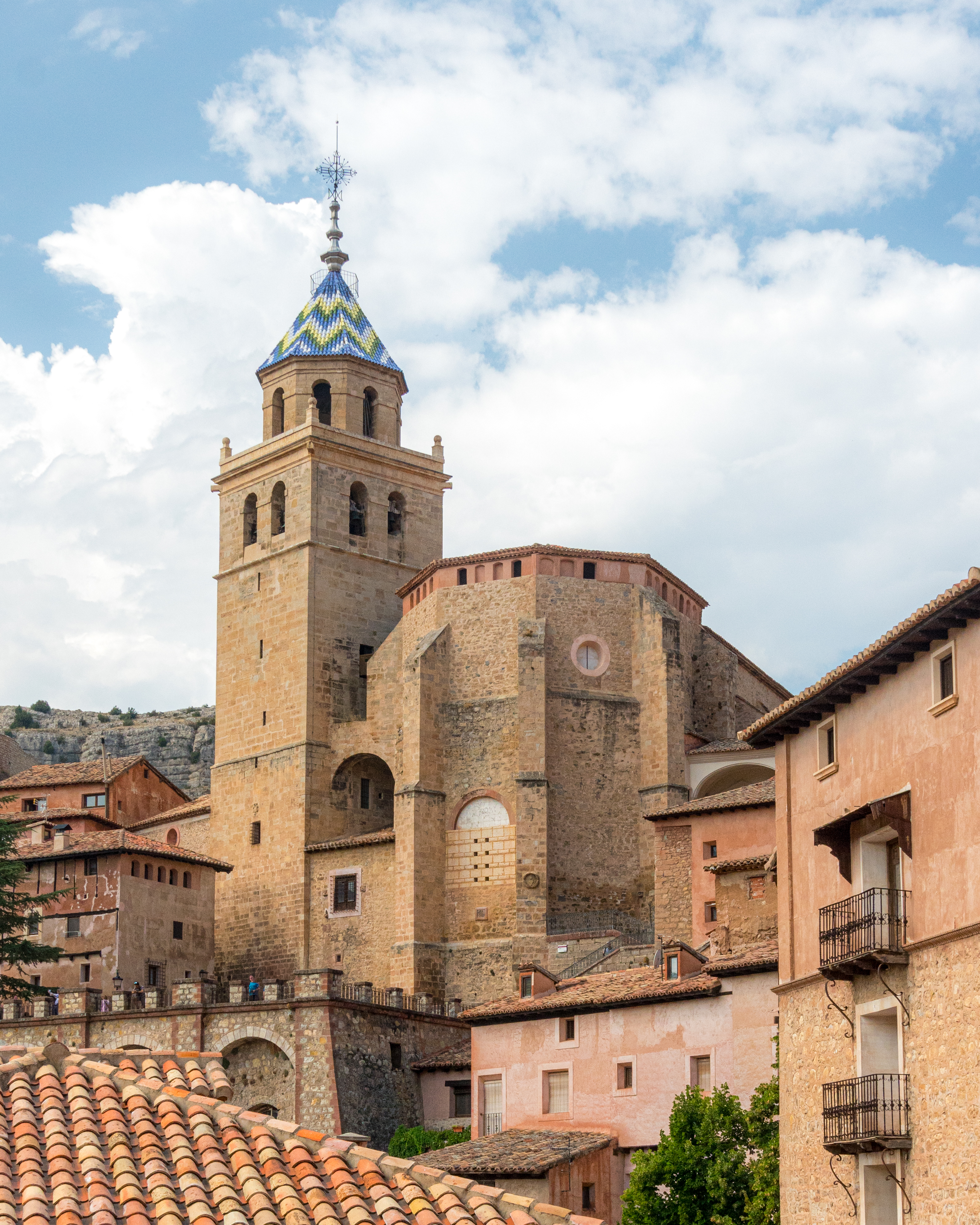
- Apse and tower, facing East
- Albarracín Cathedral
- 40.4069°N 1.4444°W
- Location: Albarracín
- Address: 1, Plaza de la Seo
- Country: Spain
- Denomination: Catholic
- Website: fundacionsantamariadealbarracin.com/en

History
- Status: Cathedral
- Dedication: Jesus as Saviour

Architecture
- Style: Gothic, Renaissance
- Groundbreaking: 1532
- Completed: 1598

Administration
- Metropolis: Zaragoza
- Diocese: Teruel and Albarracín

Clergy
- Bishop: José Antonio Satué Huerto

Spanish Cultural Heritage
- Type: Non-movable
- Criteria: Conjunto histórico
- Designated: 22 June 1961
- Part of: Conjunto histórico of Albarracín
- Reference no.: RI-53-0000030

The Cathedral of the Saviour is a Roman Catholic cathedral in the town of Albarracín, in Aragón, Spain. Together with the Cathedral of Saint Mary of Mediavilla, it is one of the seats of the Diocese of Teruel and Albarracín.

== History ==
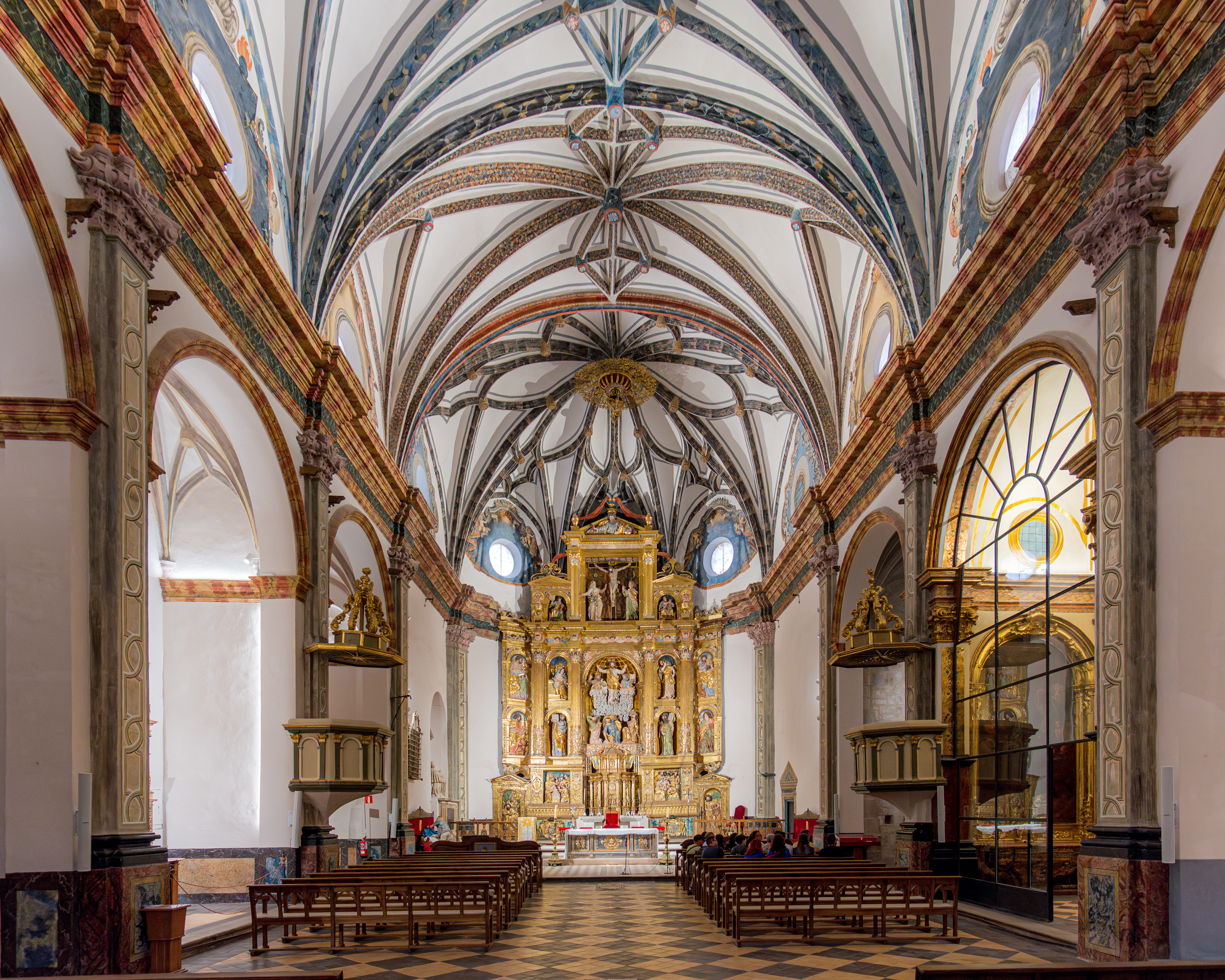
Nave and Altar.

The cathedral was built from 1572 to 1600, when the bell-tower was complete. Among the architects were Martín de Castañeda, Quinto Pierres Vedel, and Alonso del Barrio de Ajo. The church has a single nave and the ceiling has Gothic tracery. The nave interior and the Chapel of the Virgen del Pilar was redecorated in stucco and gilding in Baroque style.

The main retablo was completed in 1566 by Cosme Damián Bas.

== Gallery ==
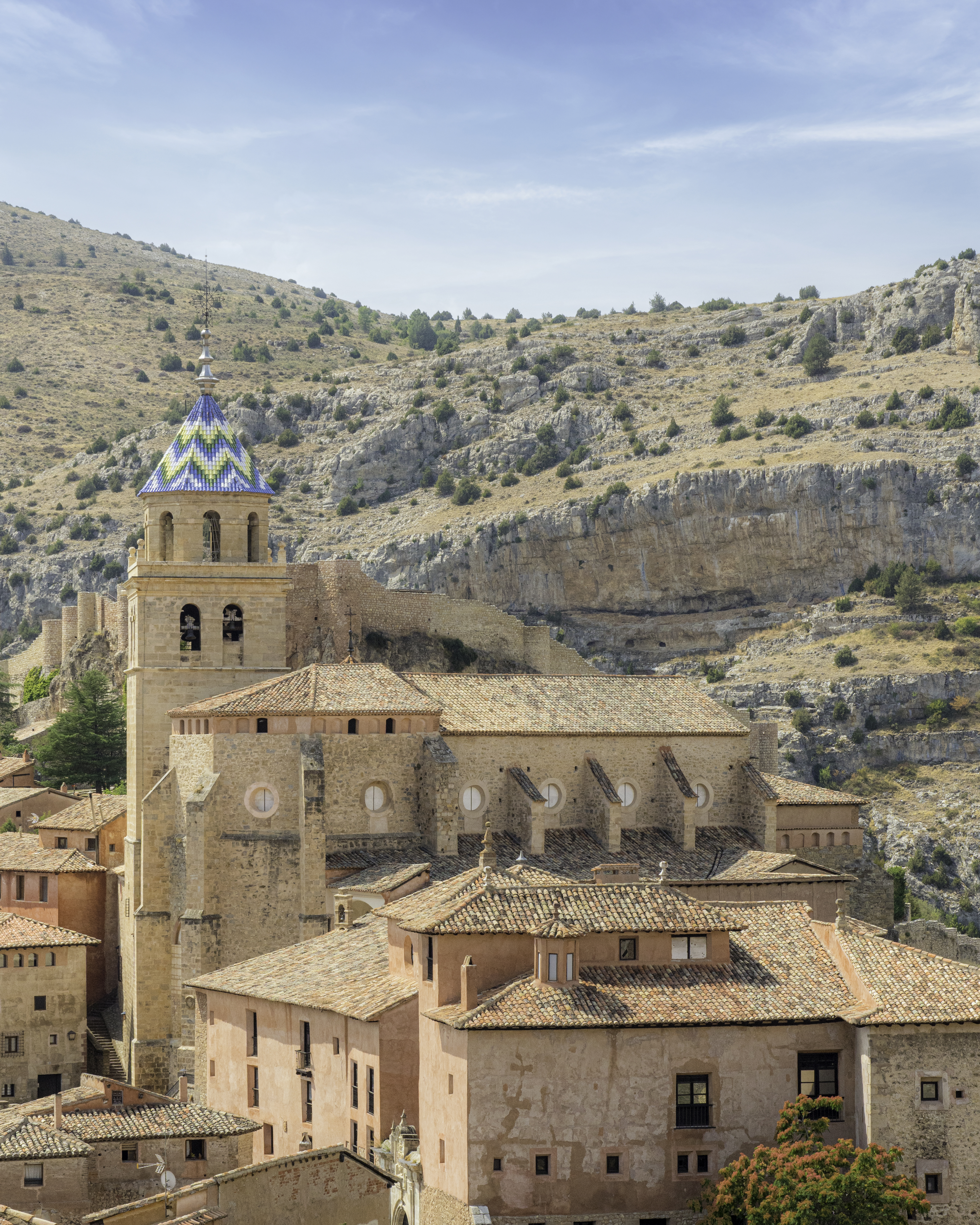
View from the city walls.

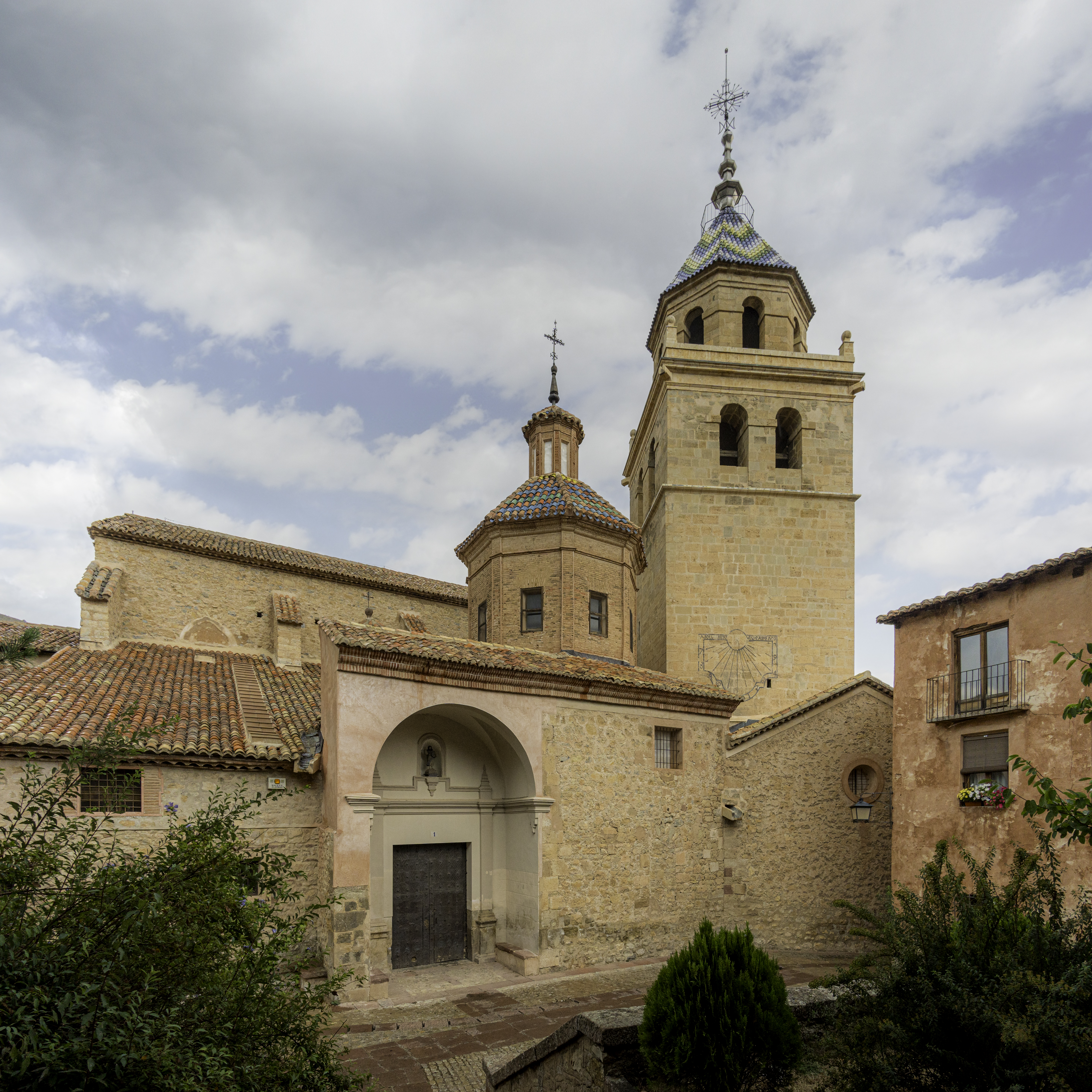
South façade.

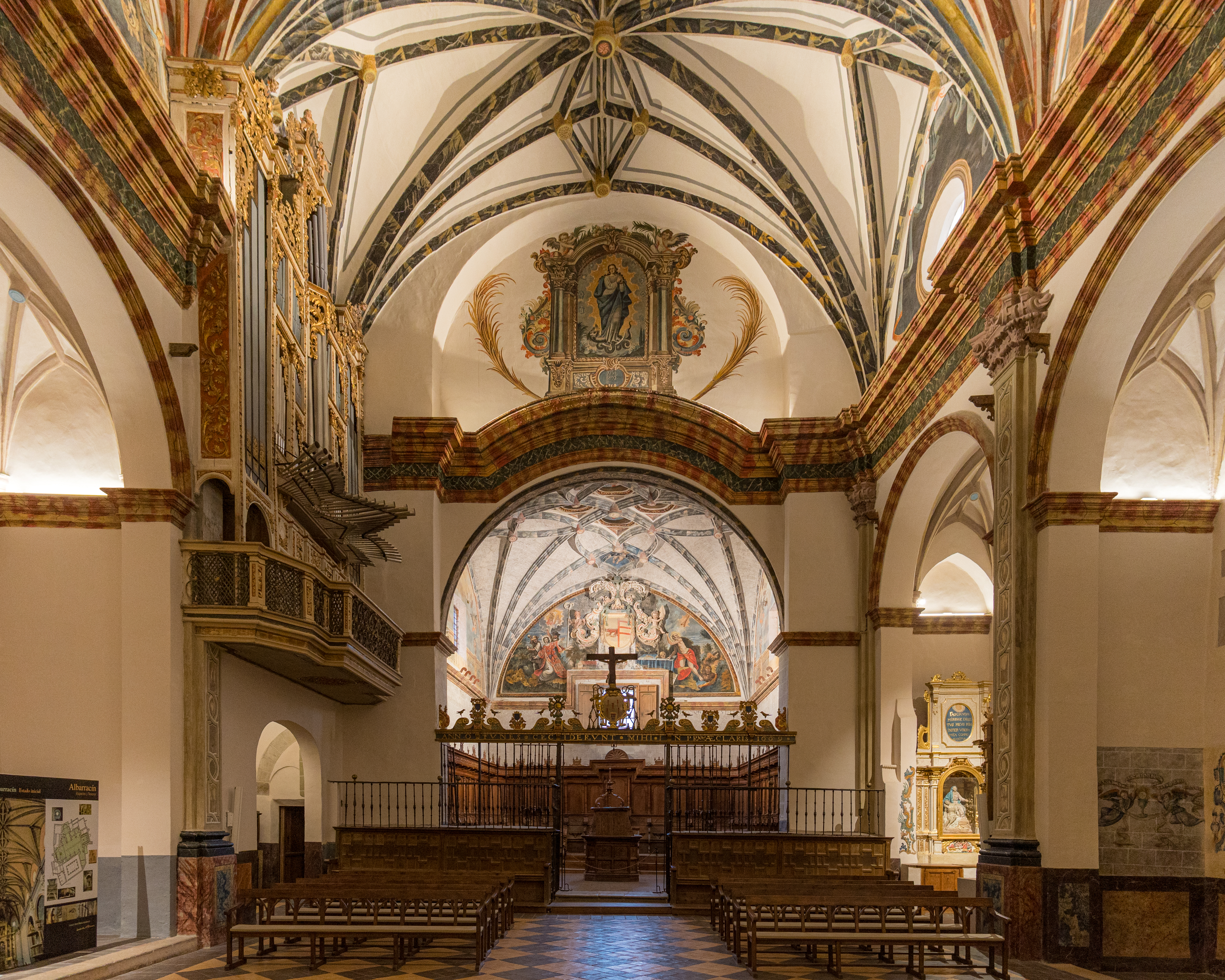
Choir and pipe organ.

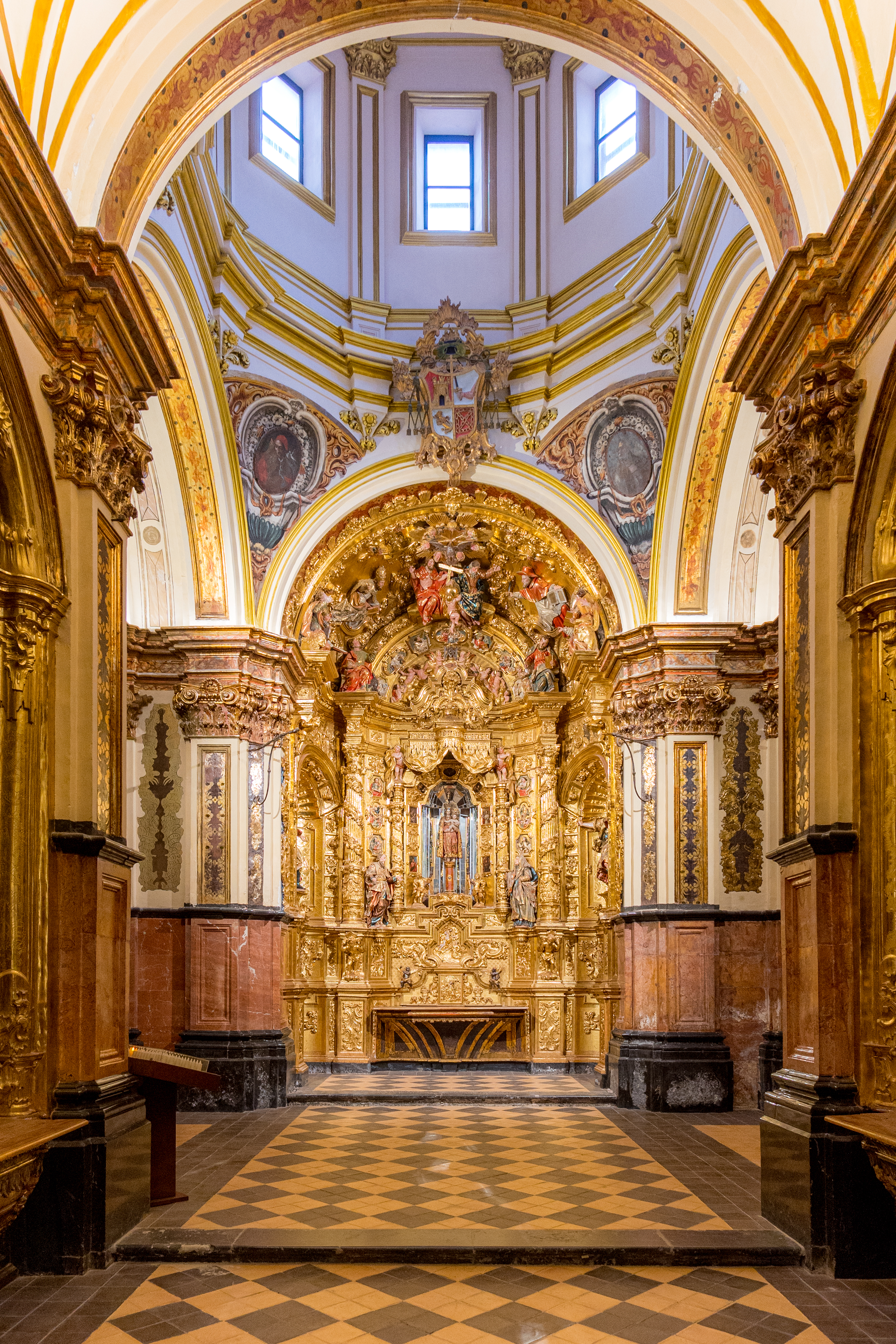
Chapel of our Lady of the Pillar.

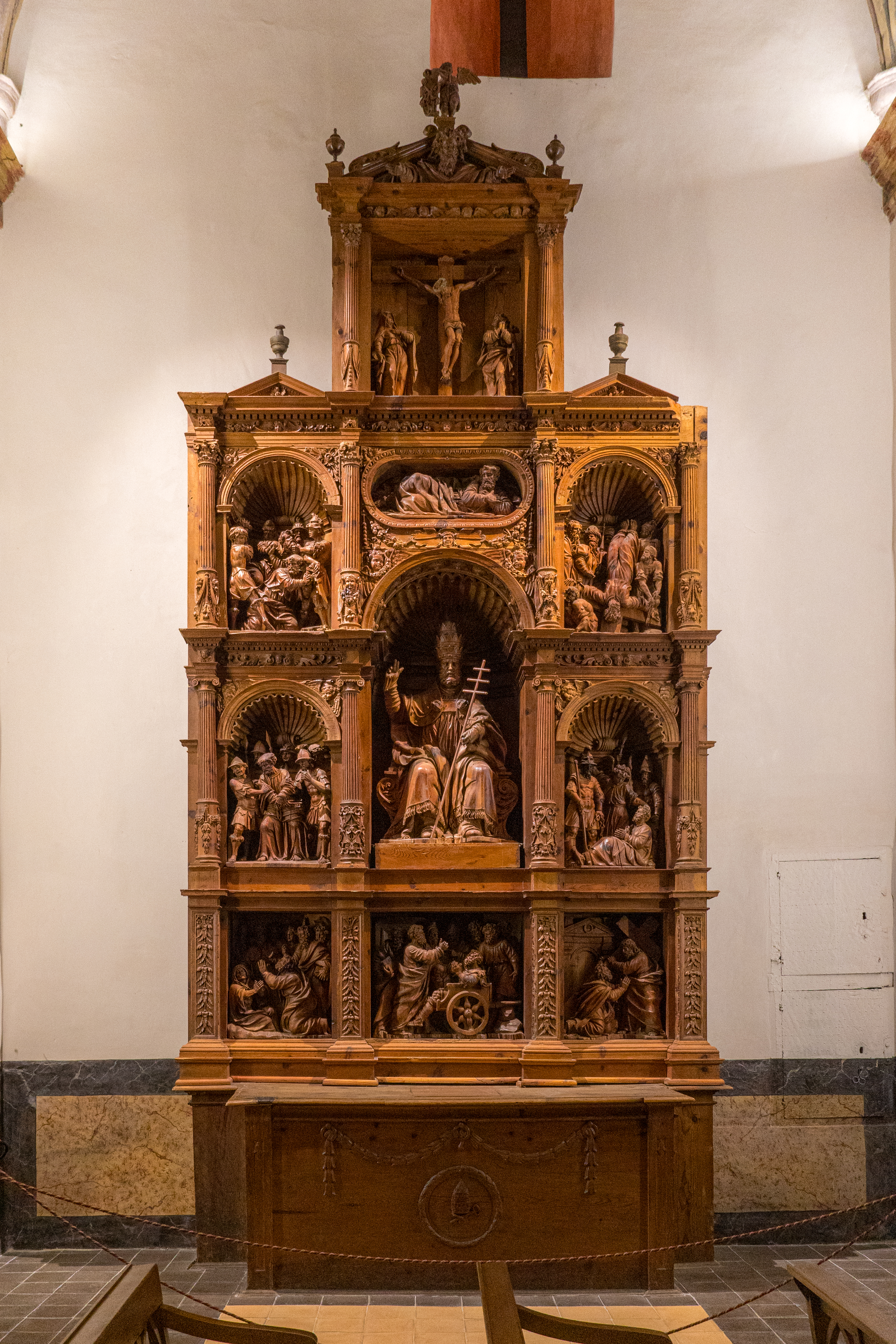
Saint Peter Chapel.
