= Montes Universales =

Mountain range in the southeastern end of the Iberian System

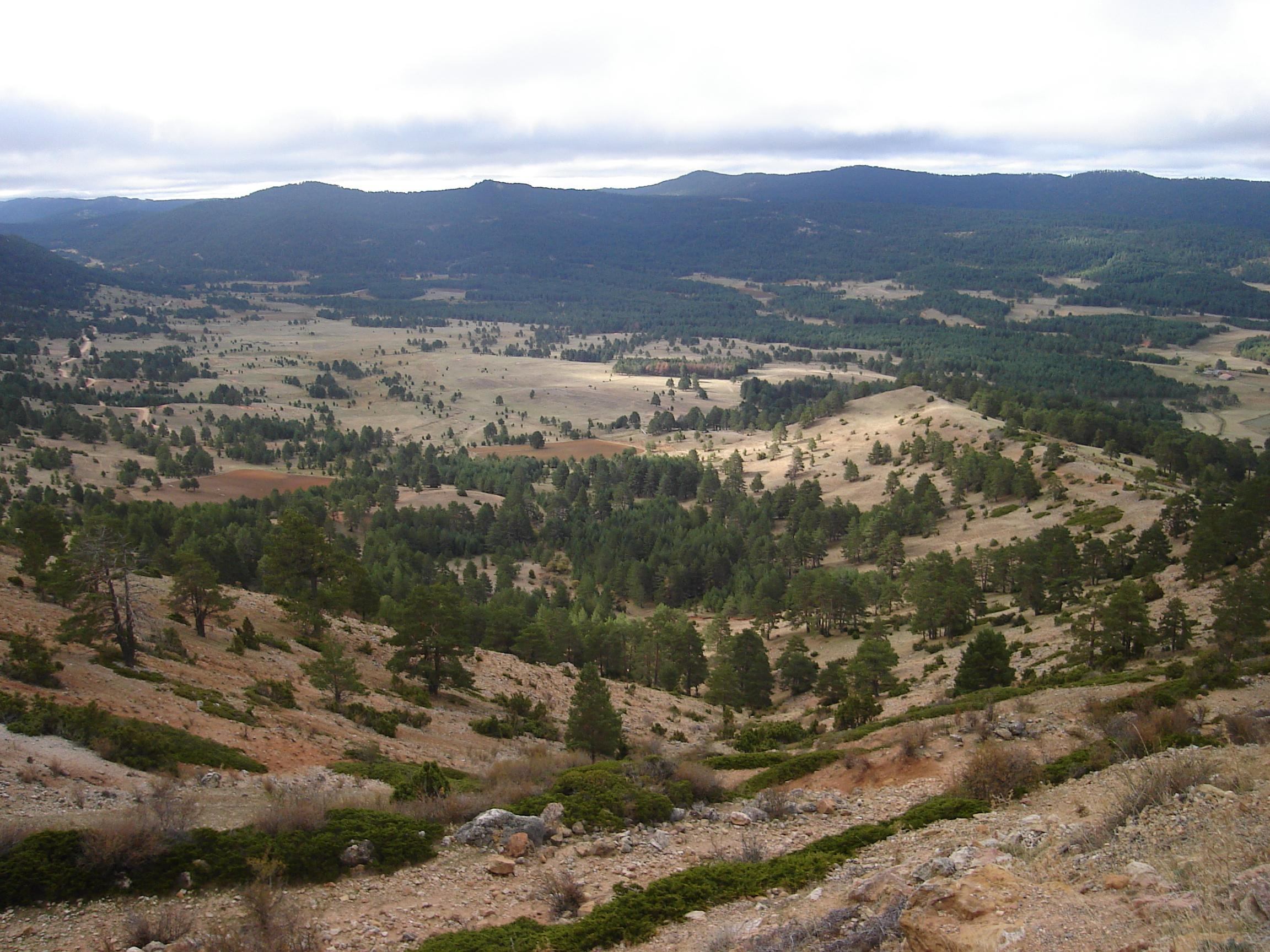
- View of the Montes Universales near Guadalaviar town

Highest point
- Elevation: 1,935 m (6,348 ft)
- Listing: List of mountains in Aragon
- Coordinates: 40°22′30″N 1°44′23″W

Geography
- Location within Spain
- Location: Sierra de Albarracín Comarca, Aragon
- Parent range: Iberian System, Southern zone

Geology
- Mountain type: Karstic (Mesozoic)

Climbing
- Easiest route: From the towns of Guadalaviar or Villar del Cobo

Montes Universales is a 32 km (20 mi) long mountain range in the southeastern end of the Iberian System. Its highest point is the 1,935 m high summit known as Caimodorro. The 1,830 m high Muela de San Juan is another important peak.

Administratively, the Montes Universales belong to the Sierra de Albarracín comarca of Aragon, therefore they are often confused with the geographical Sierra de Albarracín mountain range.

== Geography ==
The range, which is aligned in a NW - SE direction, is not as high as neighboring ranges. It is, however, very significant from the hydrographic point of view, for important rivers of the Iberian Peninsula have their source in these mountains, which divide the Atlantic from the Mediterranean watershed. Among the Iberian rivers that originate in the Montes Universales, the most important are the Tagus on the western slopes, and the Túria, Cabriel and Xúquer on the eastern.

The Montes Universales are bordered by the paleozoic massifs of Caimodorro and Loma Alta in the northeast, by the Serranía de Cuenca in the southeast, and by the Sierra de Jabalón and the Túria Valley in the east.

== Flora and fauna ==
These mountains are covered with, mostly not very dense, clumps of pine, oak and Iberian juniper forest.

Radiocarbon samples from Ojos del Tremedal show that birches, now almost absent from these mountains, were very common in the Montes Universales during the ice age around 9,600 years ago. Signs of human interference with the vegetation have been detected beginning about 3,500 years Before Present.

Zapater's ringlet (Erebia zapateri), is an endemic butterfly of these mountains.

== Features ==
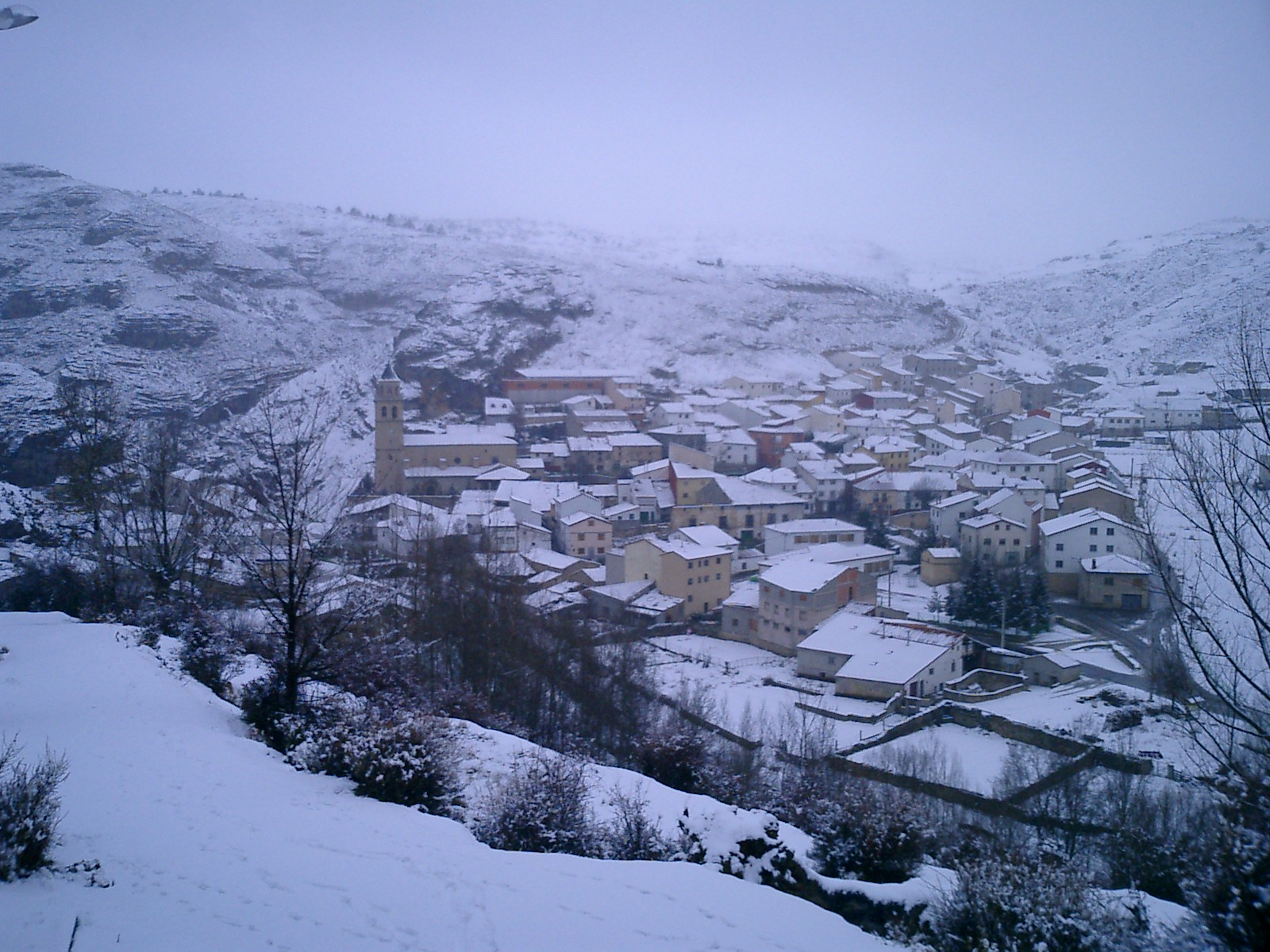
Villar del Cobo village under the Montes Universales during a winter snowstorm

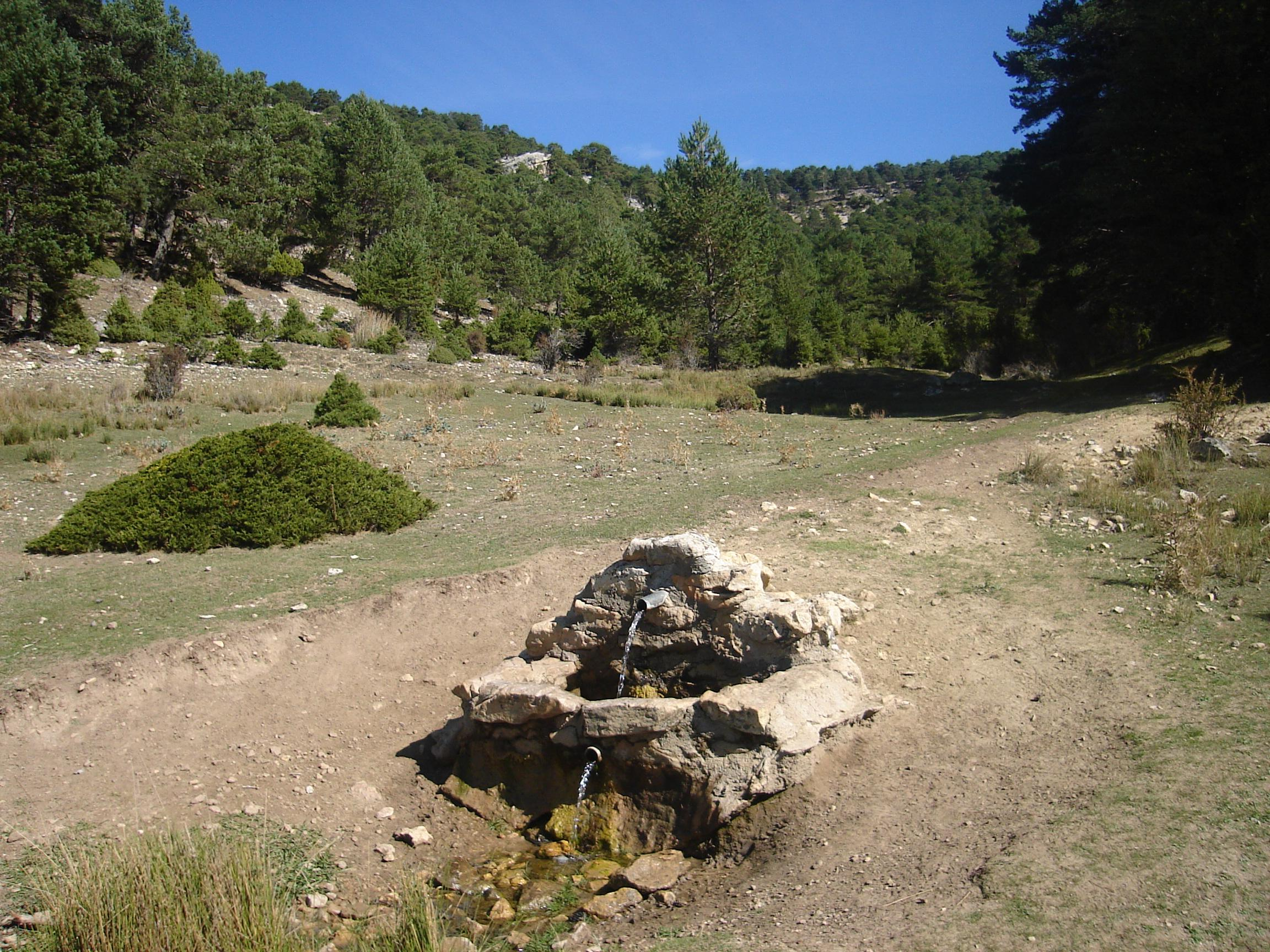
Montes Universales. The Turia River in the stretch known as Guadalaviar River until Teruel city.

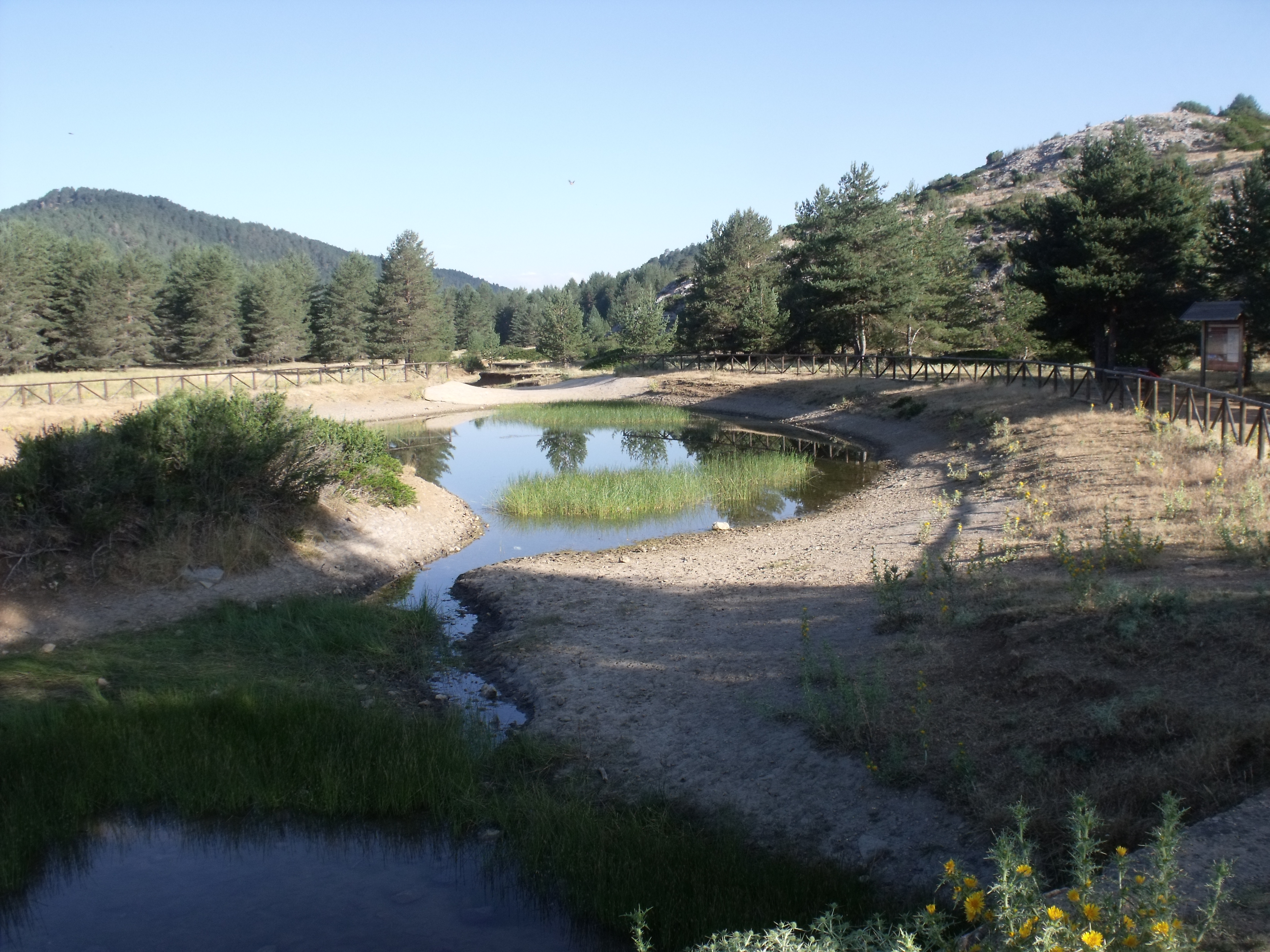
Tagus River source

== See also ==
- Frías de Albarracín
- Griegos
