= Extremadura campaign =

1936 battle of the Spanish Civil War

- Part of Spanish Civil War
| Date | 2–14 August 1936 |
| Location | Badajoz Province, Extremadura, Spain |
| Result | Nationalist victory |

Belligerents
| (Spain) Spanish Republic | (Francoist Spain) Nationalist Spain; Regulares; Spanish Legion (Kingdom of Italy) Aviazione Legionaria; Nazi Germany |

Commanders and leaders
| (Spain) Ildefonso Puigdendolas | (Francoist Spain) Juan Yagüe (Francoist Spain) Carlos Asensio (Francoist Spain) Antonio Castejón (Francoist Spain) Fernando Barron |

Strength
| 13,000 militiamen some Breguet XIX bombers | 8,000 regulars 17 medium bombers |

Casualties and losses
| Unknown military dead 6,600–12,000 militiamen and civilians shot | Unknown military dead 243 civilians shot |

The Extremadura campaign was a campaign in Extremadura, Spain during the Spanish Civil War. It culminated in the Battle of Badajoz in August 1936, from which the troops of the Army of Africa under the command of Francisco Franco moved quickly to begin the march to Madrid.

== Background ==
After the victory of the Popular Front in February 1936, the new government promised to start the land reform, but the agricultural unemployment was very high and the peasants started to illegally occupy large states. On 25 March 1936, 60,000 landless peasants in Badajoz led by the socialist's land union, the Federación Nacional de Trabajadores de la Tierra or FNTT, took over 3,000 farms and started to plough. The government decided to legalise the land occupations. By June 1936, 190,000 landless peasants had been settled in the southern Spain. Many landowners left for the cities.

In August 1936, the Nationalists, with the aid of Nazi Germany, and Fascist Italy, managed to transport to the Peninsula thousands of soldiers of the Spanish Army of Africa. Then Francisco Franco decided to advance to the north, and occupy Extremadura, in order to connect the two nationalist held zones and start the advance towards Madrid. The July's coup had succeeded in the Caceres province but in the Badajoz province the armed forces had remained loyal to the government.

== Opposing forces ==
=== Nationalists ===
The Nationalists had a force of 8,000 men of the Spanish Army of Africa, mainly members of the Spanish Legion and the Regulares (Moroccan mercenaries), backed by Andalusian Requetes, under the command of the Colonel Juan Yagüe. This force was organized in five motorized columns of some 1,500 men each (a bandera of the Legion and a Tabor of Regulares with one or two batteries of 75mm), led by the colonels José Asensio, Francisco Delgado Serrano, Fernando Barron and Heli Rolando Tella and the Major Antonio Castejón. This force had the air cover of eight Italian Sa-81 bombers flown by Italian pilots and nine Junkers Ju 52 flown by German pilots and CR.32 and He-51 fighters.

=== Republicans ===
Opposing the Nationalists, the Spanish Republican Army had a force of 13,000 militiamen and soldiers. Most of them were militiamen, for example in the city of Badajoz there were 500 soldiers and 2,000 militiamen. The members of the Republican militias had no military training and were poorly armed, there only was one rifle per three men, and one machine-gun per 150–200 men. The militiamen refused to dig trenches, had no idea of how to prepare a defensive position and the aircraft bombings caused maximum terror to peasants (a group of militiamen abandoned their positions after being bombed with melons). Furthermore, they had no artillery, barbed wire or professional staff officers. The FARE lacked gasoline, spare parts and trained pilots, and most of the Republican planes were 15-year-old Breguets, which had no nose guns and were slower than the Italian fighters, and obsolete Ni-52 fighters.

== The drive ==
On 2 August the Nationalist force left Seville and headed to the north towards Mérida and Badajoz. When the Nationalist troops reached a town, they bombed it with artillery and aircraft for half an hour, and after that the legionaries and regulares entered the town. If there was resistance they assaulted it. The militiamen fought bravely while the ammunition lasted, but when threatened by a flanking movement the militiamen would flee. In most cases the leaders of the left-wing parties and anyone with a shoulder bruised from the recoil of a fired rifle would be shot. The red’s corpses would be piled up, sprinkled with gasoline, and burned. In every town dozens or hundreds were executed by the Nationalists. Furthermore, the colonial troops looted the houses of the Republican supporters and raped thousands of working-class women. Thousands of refugees fled from the Nationalists northwards. According to Helen Graham: "...the Army strategically butchered and terrorized the pro-Republican population, especially the rural landless...It was a war of agrarian counter-reform...The large landowners who owned the vast estates which covered most of the southern half of Spain rode along with the Army of Africa to reclaim by force of arms the land on which the Republic had settled the landless poor. Rural labourers were killed where they stood, the 'joke' being they had got their 'land reform' at last -in the form of a burial plot." More than a half of the victims of the Nationalist repression in Badajoz were landless peasants and journeymen.

On 5 August the Nationalists defeated a column of militiamen and Guardias de Asalto at Los Santos de Maimona. On 7 August the Nationalist troops occupied Zafra and reached the town of Almendralejo, about 100 militiamen barricaded themselves in the town’s church and resisted a week of shelling. On 14 August, 40 survivors surrendered and were killed by the Nationalists. On 10 August the Nationalists won the Battle of Mérida. After that, Yagüe turned west and advanced to the city of Badajoz and on 14 August, after a heavy bombardment, Yagüe’s troops won the Battle of Badajoz. The Massacre of Badajoz saw Yagüe's troops kill between 500 and 4,000 republican soldiers and civilians and looted the city, even the shops and houses of the Nationalist supporters. One Nationalist officer said that this was a "war tax they pay for they salvation". Many Republican refugees tried to escape across the Portuguese frontier, but they were handed over to the Nationalists by the Portuguese government and executed.

== Aftermath ==
After the occupation of Mérida and Badajoz, the Nationalists connected the Nationalist-held northern zone and the southern zone. Furthermore, the Nationalists occupied the western half of the province of Badajoz and the Republican government lost control of the Portuguese frontier. The Nationalists carried out harsh repression in the conquered territory. Between 6,600 and 12,000 Republican supporters were executed by the Nationalists (the Republicans had executed 243 Nationalist supporters).

After the fall of Badajoz, Yagüe turned east and pushed towards Madrid. He defeated the Republican troops in the Battle of the Sierra Guadalupe and on September 3, he occupied Talavera de La Reina after defeating the Republican militiamen. Yagüe had advanced 500 km in four weeks and the road to Madrid was open.

== See also ==
- List of Spanish Nationalist military equipment of the Spanish Civil War
- List of Spanish Republican military equipment of the Spanish Civil War

== Bibliography ==
- Beevor, Antony (2006). The Battle for Spain; The Spanish Civil War 1936-1939. London: Penguin books. ISBN 0-14-303765-X.
- Espinosa, Francisco. (2003). La columna de la muerte. El avance del ejército franquista de Sevilla a Badajoz.. Editorial Crítica. Barcelona. ISBN 84-8432-431-1
- Graham Helen. (2005). The Spanish Civil War. A very short introduction. Oxford University Press. ISBN 978-0-19-280377-1
- Jackson, Gabriel. (1967). The Spanish Republic and the Civil War, 1931–1939. Princeton University Press. Princeton. ISBN 978-0-691-00757-1
- Preston, Paul (2006). The Spanish Civil War: Reaction, Revolution and Revenge. London: Harper Perennial. ISBN 978-0-00-723207-9.
- Thomas, Hugh. (2001). The Spanish Civil War. Penguin Books. London. ISBN 978-0-14-101161-5
