= Mérida Offensive =

Mérida offensive (1936)
- Part of the Spanish Civil War
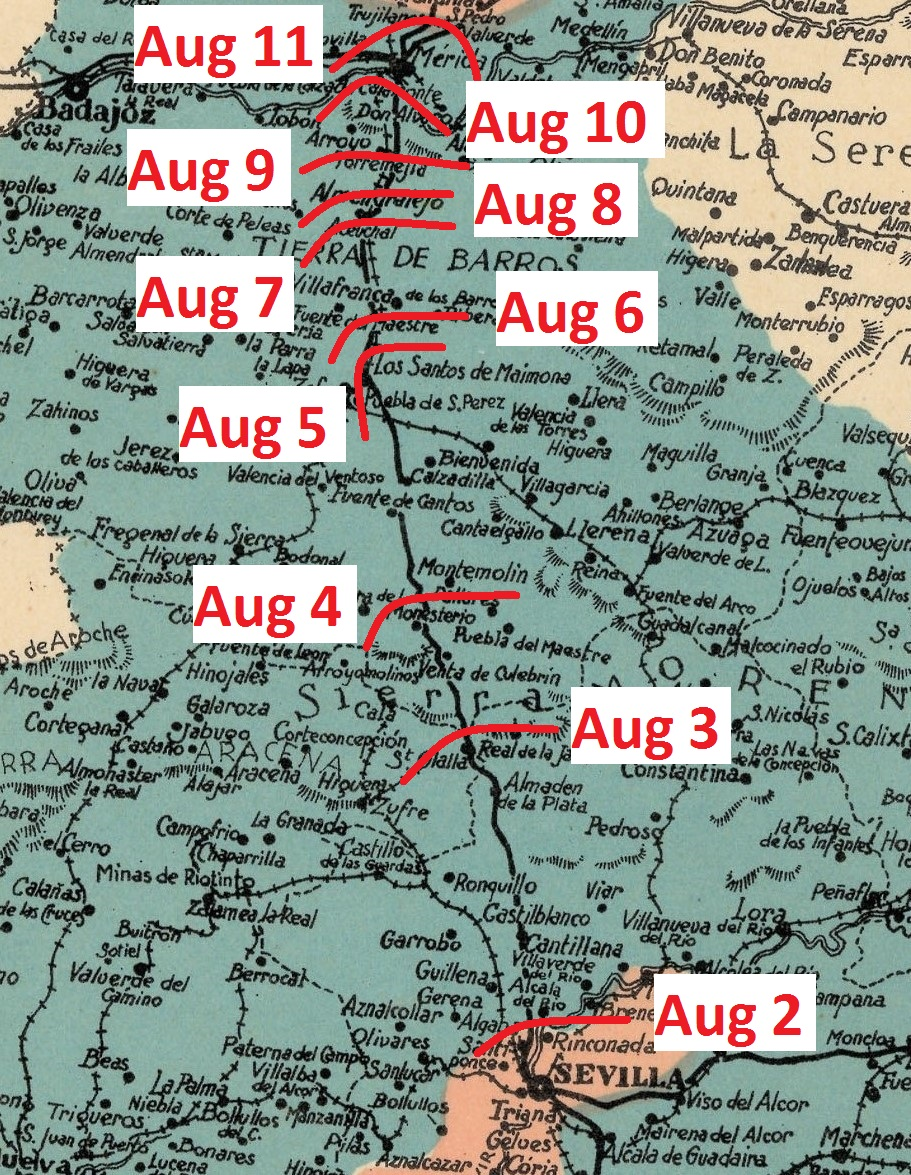
Date	2 – 11 August 1936
Location	Extremadura, Spain
Result	Nationalist victory

Belligerents
Spanish Republic	Nationalist Spain

Commanders and leaders
(Second Spanish Republic) Ildefonso Puigdengolas	(Spain) Carlos Asensio (Spain) Antonio Castejón

Strength
20,000 men	5,000 men

Casualties and losses
a few hundred KIA	around 40 KIA

The Mérida Offensive was a military operation carried out by the Nationalists during the very early phase of the Spanish Civil War in August 1936; it formed part of the Extremadura campaign. Its primary objective was connecting two rebel zones, separated by the loyalist-held southern Extremadura. The operation was designed and prepared by Franco; its starting point was Seville. The raid was executed by an improvised force, which grew from 1,000 at the beginning to 5,000 later, and was mostly composed of the Foreign Legion and the Regulares infantry units. Most of the time the Nationalists operated in two battlegroups usually referred to as "columns", commanded by Asensio and Castejón. Between August 2 and August 11 they performed a breakthrough raid of some 180 km, defeating much more numerous yet loose and poorly organized loyalists during engagements at Santa Olalla, Monesterio, Llerena, Los Santos de Maimona, and Almendralejo; the operation climaxed in the battle of Mérida. The success of the Mérida Offensive linked two rebel-held zones and proved of paramount importance for future military developments in 1936; it was also vital for the future rise of Franco as overall rebel commander.

== Preparations ==
=== First steps ===
On July 24, five days after his arrival from Canary Islands to Tetuán, Francisco Franco sent one of his chief aides, colonel Francisco Martín Moreno, by plane from Morocco to Seville. The objective was to start organizing troops for a planned advance north. At the time there were some 400 km in a straight line across loyalist-controlled territory from Seville to Madrid; the closest point controlled by the rebels in the north was in the province of Cáceres, some 160 km across the loyalist zone from the rebel enclave in Andalusia. On the very same day the Burgos-based rebel military executive, Junta de Defensa Nacional, nominated Franco "Jefe del Ejército de Marruecos y del Sur de España".

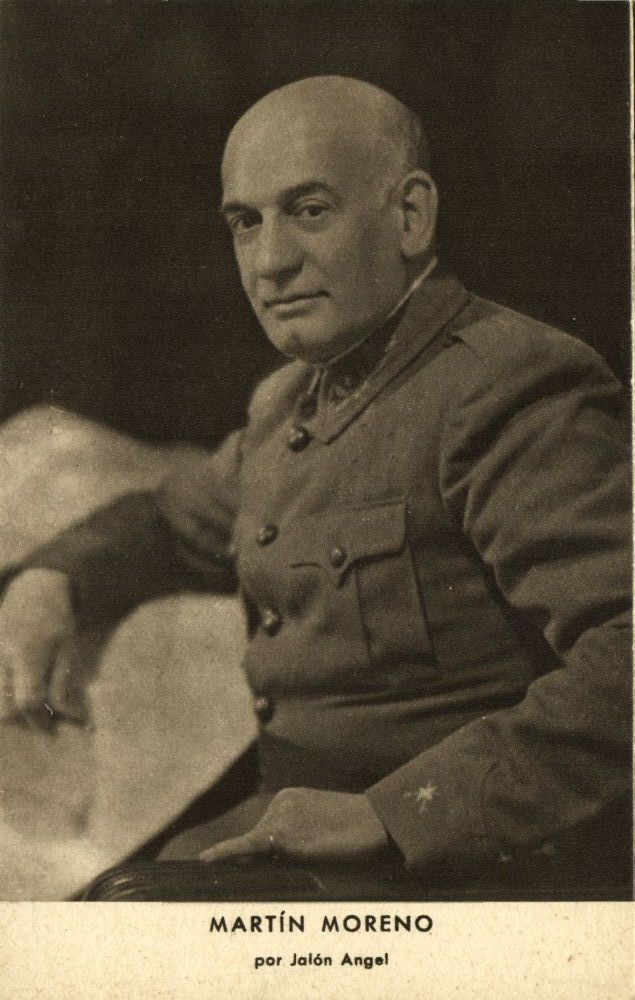
Martín-Moreno

The nomination made Franco commander of rebel troops in Morocco and in the southern peninsular enclave. They were firmly established in the area around Seville and Cádiz, with shaky connection to Córdoba. Numerous smaller locations in both provinces were controlled by the loyalists, though they formed separate islands of resistance and were pressed by the insurgents. The latter were also advancing west, towards another provincial capital, Huelva, in hands of the government. In total, the rebels had some 6,000 rebel troops in the southern enclave, though these were mostly inexperienced recruits in garrisons taken over by conspiring officers. Until July 24 no more than 500-600 battle-worthy soldiers have been transported from Africa across the Straits, some 400 by a unique naval convoy which managed to make it through the governmental blockade, and few hundred lifted by air since July 19. The airlift continued, albeit at a very slow rate, below 100 men daily.

It is not clear whether the Ministry of War in Madrid had any plan of action for the southern part of the country. At the time its key initiative was an offensive against the rebel-held Albacete. None of the sources consulted provides information whether the government was taking into account a would-be rebel offensive from western Andalusia towards Extremadura. However, on July 25 the minister of war general Luis Castelló nominated coronel Ildefonso Puigdengolas, an experienced officer who had just suffocated rebel islands of resistance in Alcalá de Henares and Guadalajara, the military commander of Badajoz. Puigdengolas flew from Madrid to Badajoz the same day and assumed command in all loyalist-held Extremadura. He immediately started to form organized combat detachments from forces of order, militiamen and what remained of infantry sub-units. How many people he had under his command is not known; intendancy figures for Badajoz-based militia only were up to 5,000; together with militiamen from smaller locations and the forces of order, the figure was probably much higher. Though the usual railway connection with Madrid via rebel-held Cáceres was broken, southern Extremadura was linked with the capital by a railway line via Ciudad Real.

On July 28 key rebel commanders in the south met in Seville; the Andalusian commander general Gonzalo Queipo de Llano played the host, Franco and general Luis Orgaz flew in the day before from Tetuán, and general José Varela arrived from Cádiz. Exact content of the meeting is not known, yet historians speculate that it was dedicated mostly to sorting out problems of command, priorities and resources. Reportedly there was some tension about usage of the troops which were being shifted from Africa. Franco, since July 24 the superior of Queipo, was allegedly "furious" about his men being deployed by the latter against local pockets of resistance; Franco claimed that attrition rate suffered when achieving what he considered a secondary objective might prevent an efficient thrust north.

=== Final touches ===
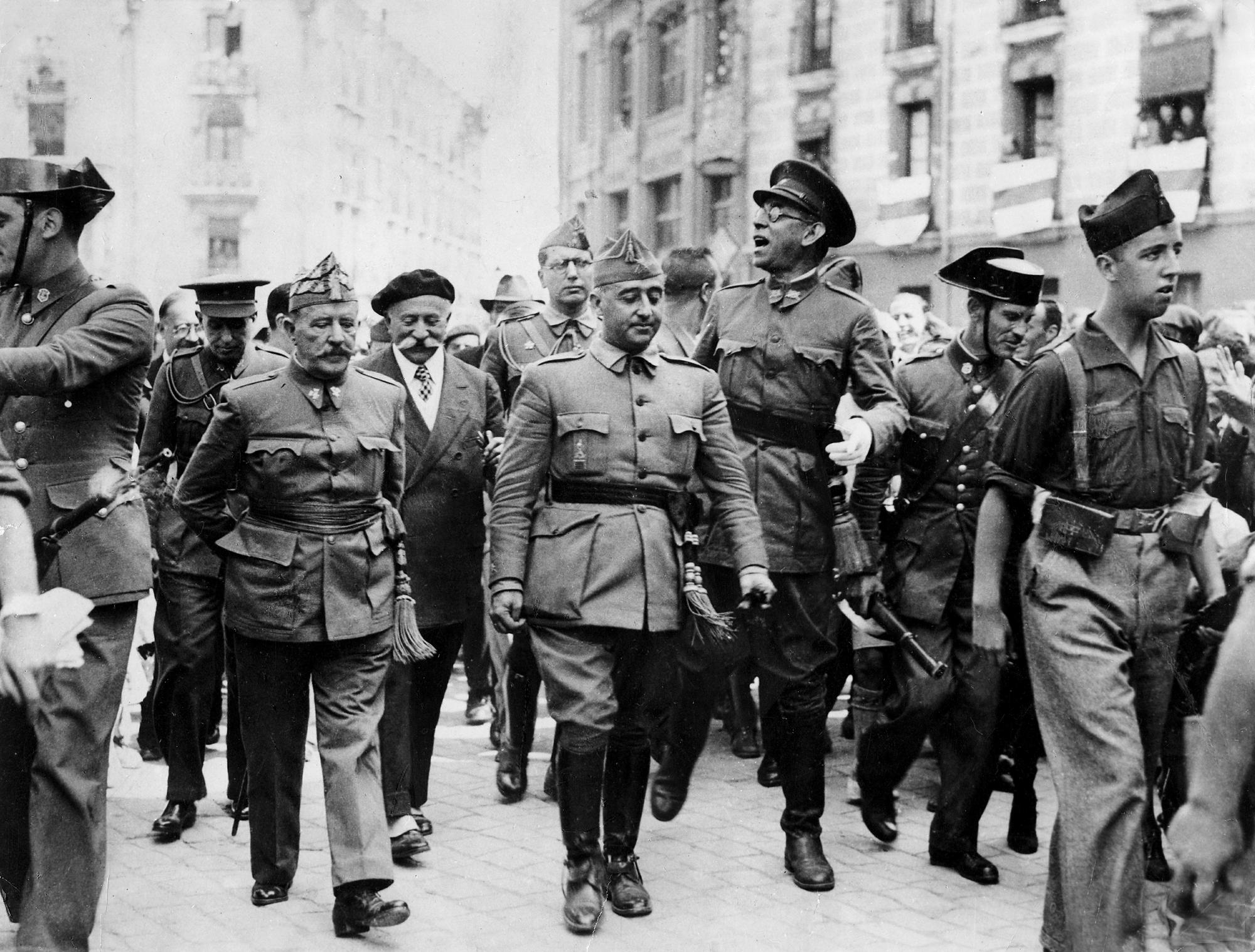
Franco, 1936

During the last 5 days of July loose rebel detachments, unrelated to troops shifted from Africa, were outflanking from both sides the major road leading from Seville towards Extremadura; in northern Andalusia it was controlled by the loyalist militias. On July 27–28 so-called Columna Carranza, led by a local Seville Falangist, took control of Guillena (18 km from Seville, 4,500 inhabitants), and Burguillos (22 km, 1,500 inhabitants), two towns east of the main road to Cáceres. Slightly later, on July 29–31, a detachment led by a Guardia Civil NCO Juan Ruiz Calderón took over locations west of the road, namely Gerena (22 km, 4,500 inhabitants), Las Pajanosas (23 km, 1,100 inhabitants), and El Garrobo (31 km, 800 inhabitants). In all these cases combat registered, if any, was minor skirmishes and loose shootout. On July 29 Franco radioed Mola that "se consolida la situación Andalucía" and new troops were being airlifted every day, but said nothing about any offensive north. This was also the day the first German transport plane arrived in Morocco; other German and Italian aircraft would be arriving during the next 10 days, increasingly the airlift capacity. From July 19 until the end of the month some 850 men from the Army of Africa have been airlifted at a rate of some 65 per day, yet with August commencing rebel commanders believed (overoptimistically, as it would turn out) that they now reached the daily airlift capacity of 500.

On August 1 Franco issued from Tetuán his Orden General de Operaciones n.º 1 del Ejército de África y del Sur de España. He ordered the troops shifted from Africa to Andalusia to commence a general advance north the following day. The objectives were specified as the cities of Zafra (120 km away) and Mérida (170 km), though no specific date for their capture has been set. Once there, troops should be prepared for further advance, either/or towards Cáceres (230 km) and possibly Badajoz (190 km). The priority was not consolidation and systematic control, but speed: "la característica del avance ha de ser la rapidez, la decisión y la energía evitando toda detención no imprescindible". Formation of another breakthrough unit, to follow suit, was also anticipated. Suffocating local focos of resistance in Andalusia was declared a secondary objective. On the very same day Franco radioed Mola that he intended to deliver north 2m cartridges, badly needed by Mola's troops, either via Cáceres or, as option B, via Portugal (Huelva was seized by the rebels on July 27, and hence they reached the friendly Portuguese frontier). In his radiogram Franco confirmed that his offensive would begin on August 2.

On August 2 Franco flew for the second time from Morocco to Seville. They key reason was to supervise personally the formation and departure of the task force, entrusted with the breakthrough raid to Zafra and Mérida; he "aimed at seeing his first column off". Another reason was again discussing with (according to some authors protesting to) Queipo the division of resources and preventing intensive use of African troops to suffocate local islands of resistance; Franco continued to believe that his troops were taking too much casualties, which impaired their potential when marching towards Madrid.

== The Raid ==
=== August 2 (departure) ===
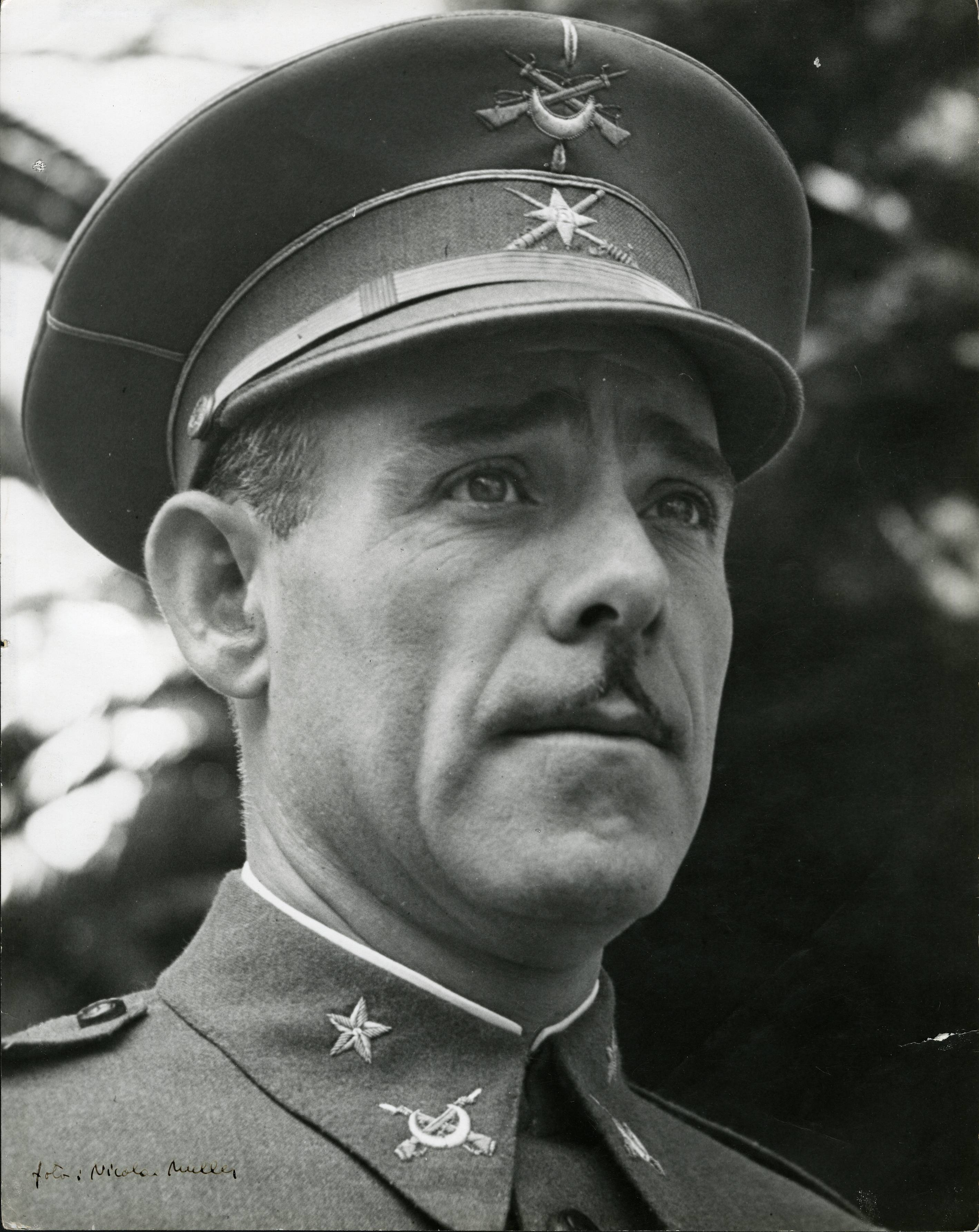
Asensio

During most of the day troops supposed to commence the offensive towards Extremadura were being assembled, organized, supplied and re-armed in Seville. In the afternoon hours this improvised battlegroup, named Agrupación n.º 1, left northbound along the main road leading to Mérida. Its commander was teniente coronel Carlos Asensio, a 40-year-old officer experienced during the war in Morocco in the 1920s; since early 1936 he has been commanding indigenous Moroccan troops, the regulares. The key component of this improvised battlegroup was IV. Bandera del Tercio, a battalion-size unit of the Foreign Legion; another one was II. Tabor de Regulares de Tetuán, also a battalion-type, but much less numerous and worse equipped unit of the Moroccan infantry. Both units had been previously transported from Africa. They were supported by one field battery of 70 mm guns (unclear whether ferried from Africa or originating from one of Andalusian garrisons), a machine-gun sub-unit, pioneers and non-combat services.

Given standards of the Spanish army of the time, these units in total would have normally amounted to some 1,000 men, and it is the figure provided by some historians as strength of Asensio's men, though others might point even to 2,500. The battlegroup, in Franco's radiograms soon to be called "columna" (a name also widely accepted by historians), departed in a huge motorcade of buses, trucks, passenger cars, motorcycles, tankers, tractors and other specialized vehicles. The column spread over the distance of few kilometers, and drove very slowly northwards for some 30 km, to the neighborhood of the small town of El Garrobo, the last settlement in hands of the insurgents. Afterwards, already after sunset, they left the rebel-controlled area and proceeded towards the unknown.

=== August 3 (Santa Olalla) ===
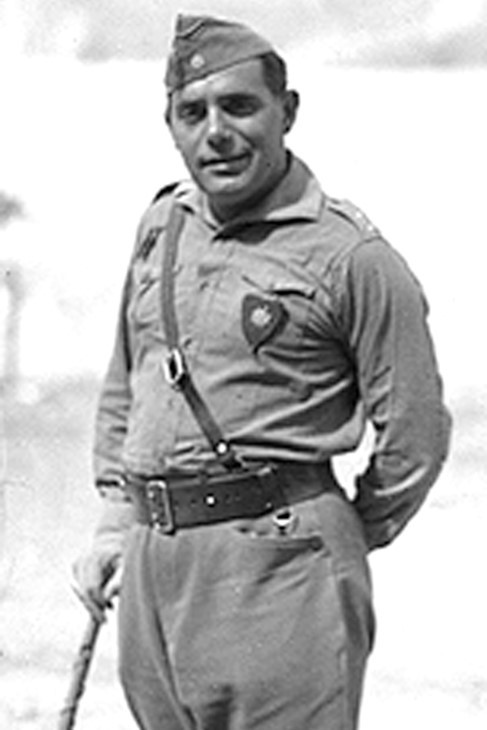
Castejón

Around 1 AM the vanguard detachments stopped before Rivera de Huelva; a bridge over this rather small river had been blown up by the militias from the nearby loyalist-held town, El Ronquillo, unclear whether shortly before the rebel arrival or earlier. Though fording was no problem for infantry, vehicles were not in position to cross. As there was no close alternative bridge available, the column stopped.

Asensio ordered few platoons of regulares to move forward on foot; they made some 6 km before reaching El Ronquillo (40 km from Seville, 2,000 inhabitants). Following a brief night shootout and taking 1 WIA as casualty, the Moroccans seized the city. It took 12 hours to repair the bridge, and the column moved forward, only to find the next bridge destroyed as well. Attempts to find a detour resulted in 4 trucks and 1 tanker broken; repair took other 6 hours. The entire column reached El Ronquillo around 6 PM.

Having appointed local authorities, during evening hours Asensio with vanguard sub-units left El Ronquillo and moved north. This time there were no problems and having covered some 20 km around 10:30 PM he reached Santa Olalla, (60 km, 3,500 inhabitants), which he entered with no combat. On August 3, Asensio made some 27 kilometers. He was unaware that at the time in Monesterio, a larger city some 20 km further north, 20 truckloads of militiamen left to confront him in Santa Olalla, to reach the town during the forthcoming night.

While the bulk of Asensio's column was in El Ronquillo, in late afternoon another similar battlegroup was leaving Seville. Named Agrupación n.º 2, it was led by comandante Antonio Castejón; like Asensio, he was also an experienced 40-year-old officer, though with the Foreign Legion, not the Moroccans. Key components of his battlegroup were two battalions, V. Bandera of the Legion and II. Tabor de Regulares de Ceuta. It included also some armored vehicles of Guardia de Asalto, few artillery pieces in an improvised unit, plus pioneer, medical and logistics services. The column also moved in some 100 vehicles; as the night fell they drove at a snail's pace along the main road, the section taken by Asensio 24 hours earlier, and would not reach El Ronquillo before dawn of the next day.

Sometime during the day Franco radio-wired Mola that his troops had just started the advance north. He either was optimistic or pretended to be so, as he claimed he remained in good relations with Berlin and Rome, that he expected the aircraft issue to be sorted out soon, and that he anticipated successful drive towards Madrid to be completed soon ("llevar a cabo acción intensa sobre Madrid").

=== August 4 (Monesterio) ===
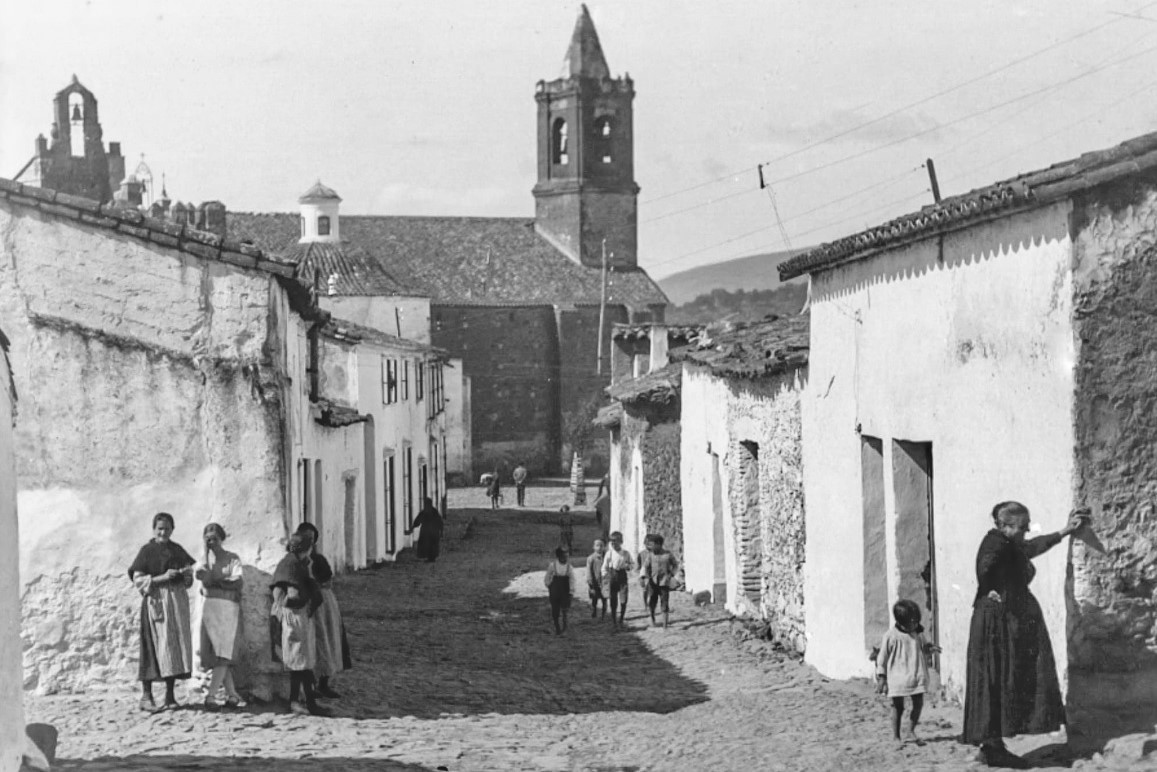
Monesterio

During very early hours of the day trucks with militiamen from Monesterio arrived at the northern outskirts of Santa Olalla, where they were fired at by vanguard patrols of the Asensio's column. Skirmishes turned into a full-scale engagement, the first one of this sort. The night exchange of fire lasted few hours and ended in total dispersion of the militia group. At the battlefield they left 14 KIA and the rest returned in disarray to Monesterio; Asensio recorded a few WIA.

Once the combat was over and still before dawn, Asensio sent small sub-units 9 km north-west to Cala (3,000 inhabitants) and 7 km north-east to El Real de la Jara (3,500 inhabitants). These towns, not located at the main road leading to Mérida, were already at the frontier with Extremadura and were known to be controlled by the loyalists. Following minor or no skirmishes (1 WIA in Jara), the militiamen fled before mid-day.

In Santa Olalla during morning hours Asensio divided his force into two battlegroups: the stronger one was to proceed north along main road towards Monesterio (15 km away), another was to move along secondary road north-east towards Llerena (35 km away), first cities already in Extremadura.

The former group reached the outskirts of Monesterio around mid-day. The city was defended by some 300-400 militiamen, who had arrived by trucks from Badajoz. Combat ensued, partially already on city streets; it produced 34 KIA on the part of the loyalists and 3 WIA on the part of the rebels. by early afternoon Asensio was already in full control of Monesterio (80 km from Seville, 7,000 inhabitants); by radio he notified Franco. He also commenced what was becoming a usual routine, i.e. rounding up suspects and appointing new authorities; as the city was the first major urban settlement, it would take him a few hours and Asensio's column remained in Monesterio for the night. During the day they made some 20 km, some 80 km during 3 days.

The smaller group, carved out from his force earlier, since late morning proceeded towards Llerena. Loyalists in the city were fully aware of the threat forthcoming, and earlier they telegraphed the Estado Mayor in Madrid requesting reinforcements; they were also in touch with Badajoz. In the meantime, the alcalde with a large group of militiamen and a detachment of Guardia Civil marched out south-west to confront the rebels long ahead of the city. However, once they were already a few kilometers from Llerena, at a place known as Puente de la Ribera, the Civiles pointed their rifles at the militiamen and disarmed them; with prisoners they continued until they met the sub-group from Asensio's force, approaching from the opposite direction. When night fell, the militiamen were executed.

The whereabouts of the Castejón's battlegroup are somewhat unclear. It is known that during morning hours they reached El Ronquillo, fully controlled since Asensio had seized it 24 hours earlier and covered in white flags. None of the sources consulted provides information what happened next, though as on the following day at least part of the column would be engaged in combat for Llerena, probably they were covering the 60-kilometre distance from El Ronquillo to Llerena. Also during the day Franco radioed another update to Mola, whom he informed that supplies with cartridges were on their way and that he hoped to get other troops across the Straits soon.

=== August 5 (Llerena, Fuente de Cantos, Los Santos de Maimona) ===
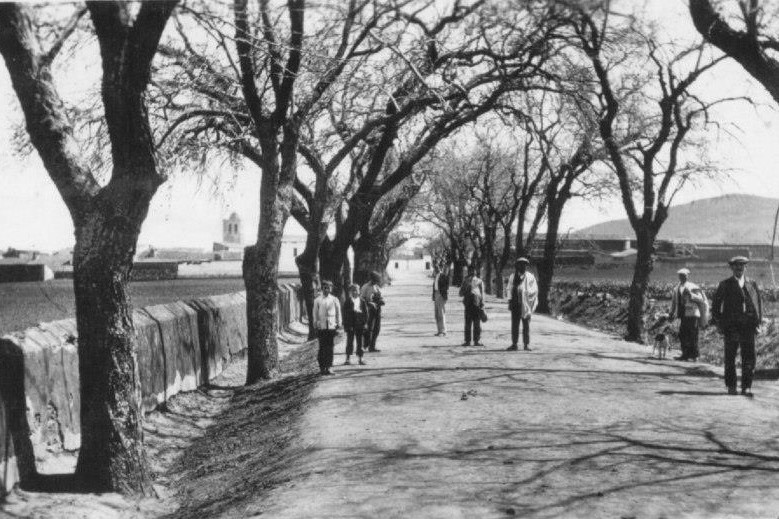
Los Santos de Maimona

During very early hours of the day vanguard Asensio's sub-units left Monesterio along the main road to Mérida and proceeded towards Fuente de Cantos (18 km away, 100 km from Seville, 11,000 inhabitants), where they arrived around 6 AM. The city - the largest of all these captured so far - was not defended and partially abandoned; it was seized with usual repressive and administrative tasks commenced. At this point Asensio was already closer to Mérida (75 km), his objective, than to Seville, his point of departure.

Approximately at the same time in Badajoz Puigdengolas formed a force, composed of 130 soldiers, 400 militiamen, 100 Carabineros and 150 Asaltos, the latter equipped with machine guns, which in some 30 trucks left the city to confront the rebel columns. He was leading this battlegroup himself. However, the convoy moved extremely slowly, unclear for what reasons; during the morning and early afternoon hours it would make merely 70 km. The Badajoz civil governor Miguel Granados Ruiz telegraphed Madrid, informed the Ministry of War that the column was on their way, and demanded immediate and large reinforcements.

Late in the morning part of the Castejón's column was already nearing Llerena from south-west; fairly easily they dispersed loose groups sent to blow up bridges on approach. However, when proceeding at the outskirts of Llerena, he was offered fierce resistance. As mid-day combat moved into the urban zone, the confrontation turned ferocious, at times for single buildings and at times involving hand-to-hand combat. The rebels deployed artillery, and a loyalist aircraft (unclear from where) tried to strafe the attackers. Following few hours, in the early afternoon the city was already fully controlled by the rebels. Losses were again highly disproportionate: 2 KIA and 2 WIA vs. over 100 KIA. Castejón left some sub-units to rest, regroup and commence repression, though with the remaining sub-units he moved out north-west, to join Asensio somewhere along the main road. The rearguard part of his column was barely in Extremadura, on their road to Monesterio.

In the afternoon Asensio left Fuente de Cantos and proceeded along the main road towards Almendralejo and Mérida. Having covered some 6 kilometers he approached Calzadilla de los Barros (105 km from Seville, 1,500 inhabitants); there was no sign of enemy. Having driven through, the column moved on and after some further 10 kilometers the troops found themselves in the vicinity of Zafra, one of the objectives listed in Franco's order of August 1. However, Asensio did not try to storm the city, located few kilometers west of the main road, and outflanked it from the east, instead heading towards the Los Santos de Maimona, which apparently was not defended.

Around 4 PM Los Santos de Maimona was approached by the 30-truck Puigengolas-led column from north-west, and by vanguard Asensio's units from the south. Soon both groups engaged each other in what developed into the largest battle on the Extremadura road so far. It was fought in the open terrain south of the city and lasted a few hours. The legionnaires and the regulares once again demonstrated superiority over a loose mix of guardias and militias; the losses were 2 KIA and 19 WIA for Asensio, and possibly even few hundred KIA for the loyalists. The remaining defenders withdrew and returned to Badajoz, some without having taken part in combat. Puigdengolas later blamed the Carabineros. First Asensio's sub-units entered Los Santos de Maimona (120 km from Seville, 8,500 inhabitants). During the day his troops made some 40 km.

=== August 6 (pause) ===
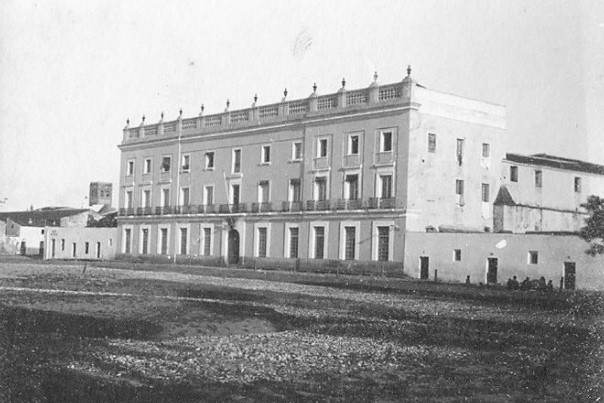
Badajoz, Guardia Civil barracks

None of the sources consulted informs about any progress of rebel columns during the day; there is no information on any new municipalities having been seized. It seems that Asensio was gathering forces of his battlegroup, scattered along the main road to Los Santos de Maimona, in the very city; they were most likely resting, regrouping, looting and carrying out various repressive actions. At the time Castejón and most of his men were assembling some 40 kilometers south, in Monesterio, though some sub-units remained in Llerena. In the evening first Asensio's troops started to leave Los Santos and advance across the enemy territory northbound, still along the main road leading to Mérida, towards the nearest city of Villafranca de los Barros. At the same time Castejón started to move his troops across the safe rebel-held zone, from Monesterio to Los Santos. The evening-timed departure of both groups was probably related to earlier activity of loyalist aircraft, which strafed and bombed rebel columns during marches and skirmishes. Martín Moreno, who at the time emerged as the Seville-based chief of staff of advancing columns, issued a document which ordered mostly nightly advance: to "aprovechar para avanzar las horas en que aquélla [enemy aviation] es impotente: la noche y las últimas horas de la tarde".

The most important military developments of the day took place in Badajoz. The local Guardia Civil garrison since the very beginning of the coup demonstrated some ambiguity; also during the battle at Los Santos they were barely engaged in combat. During the night some 150 Civiles, under regular command of comandante José Vega Cornejo, who so far had remained strictly loyal, gathered in the barracks, refused to follow orders from either Puigdengolas or Granados, and declared against the government; at some 3 AM they were joined by some Asaltos. They sent radio messages to rebel forces in Caceres, Seville and Tetuán, declaring themselves in favor of the "patriotic movement" and requesting assistance. Franco asked Asensio to verify whether this was true or a trap, and further radio communications followed. Some chaotic exchange of fire between Guardias and militiamen took place, until around 6 PM Puigdengolas tried to intervene personally. What happened later is unclear; he was wounded in the arm and ended up in captivity of the rebel Civiles. In return, the loyalists started to detain family members of the guardias and commenced negotiations, which continued until the following day.

Frantic telegraph and radio exchange was taking place also among the loyalists. The Badajoz civil governor and local authorities in Zafra and Mérida kept alarming Madrid with news about rebel advance and what looked like an imminent fall of southern Extremadura. There is little known about response on part of the Ministry of War and the general staff. The only information available is that on governmental order troops were being assembled in Ciudad Real, with the intention to transport them by rail some 200 kilometers to Mérida or Badajoz. On the opposing side, in the afternoon Franco for the third time flew from Tetuán to Seville, this time to firmly establish his headquarters in the city. He was visibly anxious that troops from Africa, which were being continuously airlifted to the peninsula by Spanish and newly arriving German and Italian aircraft, were to be used exclusively for the raid north. Though in radio messages to Mola he was declaring total confidence, he remained nervous and when contacting local commanders he indulged in violent outbursts, rather exceptional given Franco's rather calm and optimistic character.

=== August 7 (Zafra, Villafranca) ===
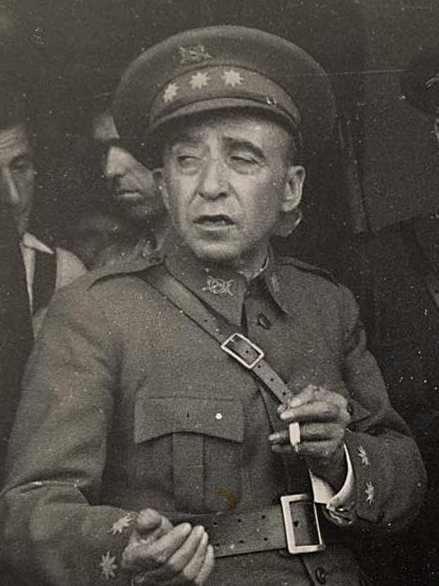
Puigdengolas

In Badajoz at 5 AM the rebel Civiles, closed and besieged in their barracks, continued to negotiate exchange of hostages with the militiamen. They radioed Franco, who responded that no surrender was to be discussed and tried to enhance the spirit of resistance. However, at that point the closest place controlled by the rebels was Zafra, some 70 km away, and apart from a single aircraft, which dropped few bombs on the infantry barracks, there was no help in sight. Moreover, miners from some pits in the area started drilling the walls of the fortified barracks, preparing to plant explosives which were to demolish the compound. Around mid-day the Civiles surrendered, and Puigdengolas was set free. Their rising lasted less than 48 hours, but the combat related produced some 20 KIA, mostly among the militiamen.

During very early hours of the day vanguard Castejón's sub-units, which by the evening of the previous day reached Los Santos, drove north-west to Zafra, the city that had been bypassed by Asensio's troops earlier and remained in loyalist control. It appears that he was offered some resistance, as Castejón ordered artillery shelling of some buildings, including the church and the railway station. At 6:30 AM he was already in full control of Zafra (120 km from Sevile, 7,500 inhabitants). Also neighboring town of Puebla de Sancho Pérez (3,500 inhabitants) was occupied. Usual purges, looting and repression followed. Castejón ordered also some of his rearguard units to turn west, where a large salient between the Portuguese frontier and the main Seville-Cáceres road was still controlled by the loyalists; later during the day they would occupy Medina de las Torres (115 km from Seville, 4,000 inhabitants).

While Castejón was engaged in Zafra, Asensio and his troops were already moving north and around 3:30 AM they were at the outskirts of Villafranca de los Barros (135 km from Seville, 14,000 inhabitants). Accounts as to what happened later are confusing; it seems that many militiamen fled the city without offering any resistance, but some opened fire. Another group intended to set fire to a local arrest, where around 60 right-wingers were held, but for unclear reasons - either intervention of the alcalde or advance of rebel troops - they failed. During late morning hours the rebels entered the city and took control of the centre; in the afternoon most of them left northbound, but a small detachment was left to suffocate last focos of resistance and loose shootout continued. The mayor, besieged in the ayuntamiento, kept sending telegraph messages requesting reinforcements; the last one was dispatched around 3:20 PM.

Asensio's units which crossed Villafranca covered some 15 km and around mid-day approached Almendralejo, the first mid-size urban centre (150 km from Seville, 18,000 inhabitants). He knew he would meet a significant loyalist force, and indeed the defenders - their number might have been approaching 1,000, with at least 600 rifles - greeted them with fire. The rebels deployed artillery, but in return, 3 loyalist aircraft (probably from a small Don Benito airbase) bombed the attackers; already before combat moved into the city streets, they suffered 3 KIA and 20 WIA. The usual rebel strategy of enveloping points of resistance and inducing the defenders to flee, did not work. Militiamen set fire to local arrest, where local right-wingers were held; unlike in Villafranca the arsonists were successful, and 28 detainees perished in flames. When the night fell none of the warring sides achieved any progress and shootout continued across the city; for the first time, following a few hours of combat the rebels failed to break resistance of their opponents.

=== August 8 (Almendralejo) ===
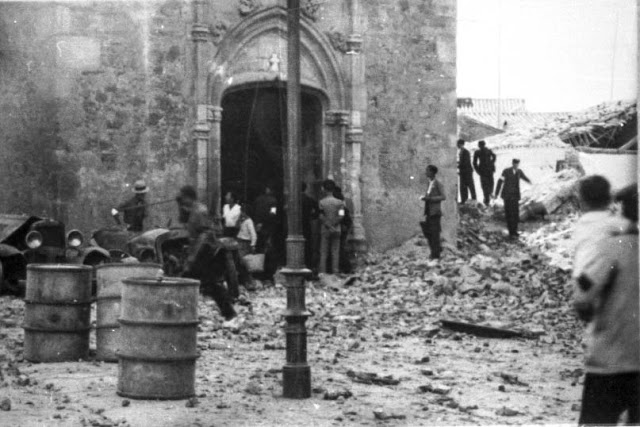
Almendralejo, Purificación church

The fighting in Almendralejo continued since the previous day; the legionnaires and the Moroccans were gradually gaining the upper hand. Militiamen started to withdraw to isolated points of resistance; the key one was the church of Nuestra Señora de la Purificación. Asensio ordered that the church be set on fire, which forced some 50 defenders to seek shelter in the bell tower. Attempts to suffocate them with fire and smoke or to storm the tower failed, and combat continued throughout the day, though most of the city was already occupied by the rebels. As Asensio was under orders to prioritize the advance north, he decided to send a large part of his battlegroup to Mérida, which was now only 24 kilometers away; they started to move out of the city in the evening hours. Asensio himself remained in Almendralejo and wired Franco for immediate reinforcements, as this fairly large urban centre was home to many left-wingers, and his remaining troops were reportedly not in position to carry out the repressive actions properly.

During the day Castejón had his headquarters in Los Santos, some 30 km south of Almendralejo; Franco ordered him to join forces with Asensio and prepare for common assault on Mérida. He also ordered his staff to complete preparations to form a large reinforcement and supply column, to leave Seville the following day; apart from 4 batteries of light artillery it was to be composed of tankers and lorries with cartridges. He also wired the local rebel commander in Cáceres, and enquired about the feasibility of mounting a pincer attack on Mérida, e.g. from the north and from the south. Results of this query are not known, yet no assault on Mérida has ever been attempted from Cáceres. Another Franco's initiative was to re-organize the command chain; the day before he nominated colonel Juan Yagüe, until then in Tetuán and heading a Moroccan garrison, to assume command of the troops advancing across Extremadura. Yagüe arrived in Seville, though he would not depart for the frontline for a few days.

What was taking place in the Ministry of War and general staff in Madrid is not clear. The minister, general Castelló, suffered sort of nervous collapse. Apart from having been overwhelmed by events, he was apparently extremely anxious about the fate of his family, which remained in Badajoz (before being nominated minister, he served as commander of the Badajoz garrison); this information can hardly be reconciled against apparent disregard of developments in Extremadura by the general staff. On August 6 Castelló was dismissed and replaced by coronel Juan Hernández Saravia. At the time the governmental focus in southern Spain was on the offensive against Córdoba, just launched by Miaja; while it pressed the rebels in the southern enclave, it also developed some 150 km away from Mérida and had no impact on the Extremadura campaign. From some sources it might emerge that despite a string of defeats, suffered during the last week, the Ministry of War might have still underestimated the strength of rebel forces advancing from Seville towards Cáceres.

=== August 9 (pause) ===
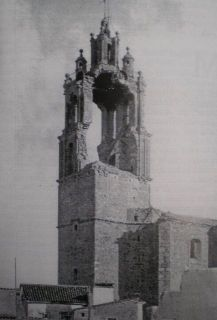
Almendralejo church

In the province there was no major fighting recorded during the day. Units from joint battlegroups led by Asensio and Castejón were being regrouped, getting ready for the anticipated battle for Mérida, the city they knew that would be defended. Castejón approached Torremejía, a small (1,500 inhabitants) settlement half-way between Almendralejo and Mérida, but he did not try to enter the village. Rearguard units and services, especially pioneer and medical detachments, were being brought from the rear in anticipation of, respectively, the need to plant explosives and to treat the wounded.

In Almendralejo the only island of resistance continued to be the Nuestra Señora de la Purificación bell tower; rebel troops deployed an artillery piece, which damaged part of the construction, yet the defenders refused to surrender and the combat continued. In the meantime the supply column, as ordered the day before, left Seville and following few hours, its front vehicles reached vanguard Asensio's troops. Various sub-units from the Castejón battlegroup, still scattered in southern Extremadura, turned against towns and villages located east of the Seville-Cáceres road, securing right flank of the main force from a would-be loyalist counter-offensive from the east. During the day or the day after they occupied the cities of Hornachos (7,000 inhabitants), Bienvenida (6,000 inhabitants) and Ribera del Fresno (5,500 inhabitants), apart from smaller settlements like Puebla del Prior, Hinojosa del Valle, Casas de Reina, Trasierra, and Reina. Most of these places had been abandoned by left-wing militiamen shortly before the legionnaires and the regulares arrived, though there were also some skirmishes recorded.

In Seville one more battlegroup was formed and left the city northwards, along the road taken 7 days earlier by Asensio and 6 days earlier by Castejón. It was commanded by major Heliodoro de Tella, a 48-year-old officer and veteran of the Rif war; in early 1936 he commanded the 1. Legion in Morocco, before the Popular Front him reduced him to the disponible forzoso category (in service, but with no particular assignment). The group mirrored composition of the earlier-formed columns: it consisted of I. Bandera del Tercio, I. Tabor de Regulares de Tetuán, one battery of field artillery, a Guardia Civil company and service sub-units. Tens of vehicles left Seville and within the next 48 hours most of them would cover the 180-kilometre distance to Mérida.

=== August 10 (before Mérida) ===
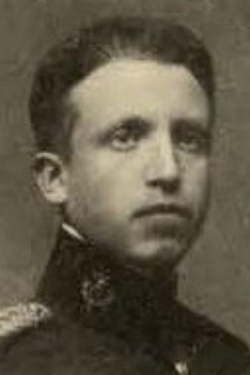
Rodríguez Medina

In the morning hours Castejón tried to penetrate into Torremejía; it turned out that the village was not defended, as revolutionary committee liberated the prisoners held and fled. The rebels moved on towards the left bank of the Guadiana and deployed their units in immediate vicinity of Mérida, located just across the river; the defenders counted 115 enemy trucks. Preparations were made for fording, e.g. the insurgents were looking for locals who would help them identify points where the river might be easily crossed. At some time they commenced artillery fire; according to some sources it was in the evening, but defenders later claimed they were being shelled most of the day. The loyalists also used their artillery, yet they were running short of ammunition and at 9 PM they again contacted Madrid urgently demanding new deliveries. Few aircraft, both rebel and loyalist, flew bombing sorties; it seems that the latter, based on the Don Benito airfield (40 km away), were somewhat more active than the former, which had to fly from Seville. By the evening vanguard units from Tella's battlegroup, which left Seville 24 hours earlier, reached Asensio and Castejón. To finalize the plan of assault, the staff meeting was held; it was headed by Asensio, who provisionally led the entire force (the overall commander Yagüe was still in Seville).

Rebel forces, in internal communications referred to as "Columna Madrid", amounted to some 4,500 men; not all of them were facing Mérida, as some sub-units were still scattered along the way or deployed against minor focos of resistance. In general, they consisted of 3 banderas of the Foreign Legion, 3 tabores of the regulares and 4 batteries of artillery (7.5 and 10.5 cm), plus various pioneer, intendancy, medical and supply detachments. They were divided into roughly equal 3 agrupaciónes, commanded by Asensio (4. Bandera, 2. Tabor de Tetuán), Castejón (5. Bandera, 2. Tabor de Ceuta) and Tella (1. Bandera, 1. Tabor de Tetuán). The plan envisioned that Castejón would mount a frontal assault across the old Roman bridge straight into the heart of the city, while Tella and Asensio would try to ford the Guadiana some 10–15 km east, outflank the defenders and descend upon them from the right-hand side. Asensio also ordered some detachments to turn back, as Villafranca and Zafra reported loose loyalist groups moving across in the rebel rear.

None of the sources consulted provides information on strength and composition of the defenders, except that they were a mix of militiamen, Carabineros, some Asaltos and some Civiles, and that they operated at least 2 artillery pieces. They were commanded by a 36-year-old Carlos Rodríguez Medina, the infantry captain who has been recently posted to Guardia de Asalto. Despite repeated telegraph messages from Mérida, Badajoz and Don Benito to Madrid, which asked for reinforcements, there is nothing known of any troops arriving. The exception is few officers, called off from as far as Valencia and posted to endangered Extremadura; none of them would arrive before Mérida and Badajoz fell to the rebels. Puigdengolas sent some 120 men from Badajoz, yet it seems he also dramatically underestimated the rebels. During the day the rebel command in Seville was probably more concerned with Miaja's counter-offensive against Córdoba; his troops just entered Adamuz, merely 25 km from the provincial capital. Defenders of the isolated bell tower in Almendralejo kept on resisting (they would surrender on August 15).

=== August 11 (Mérida) ===
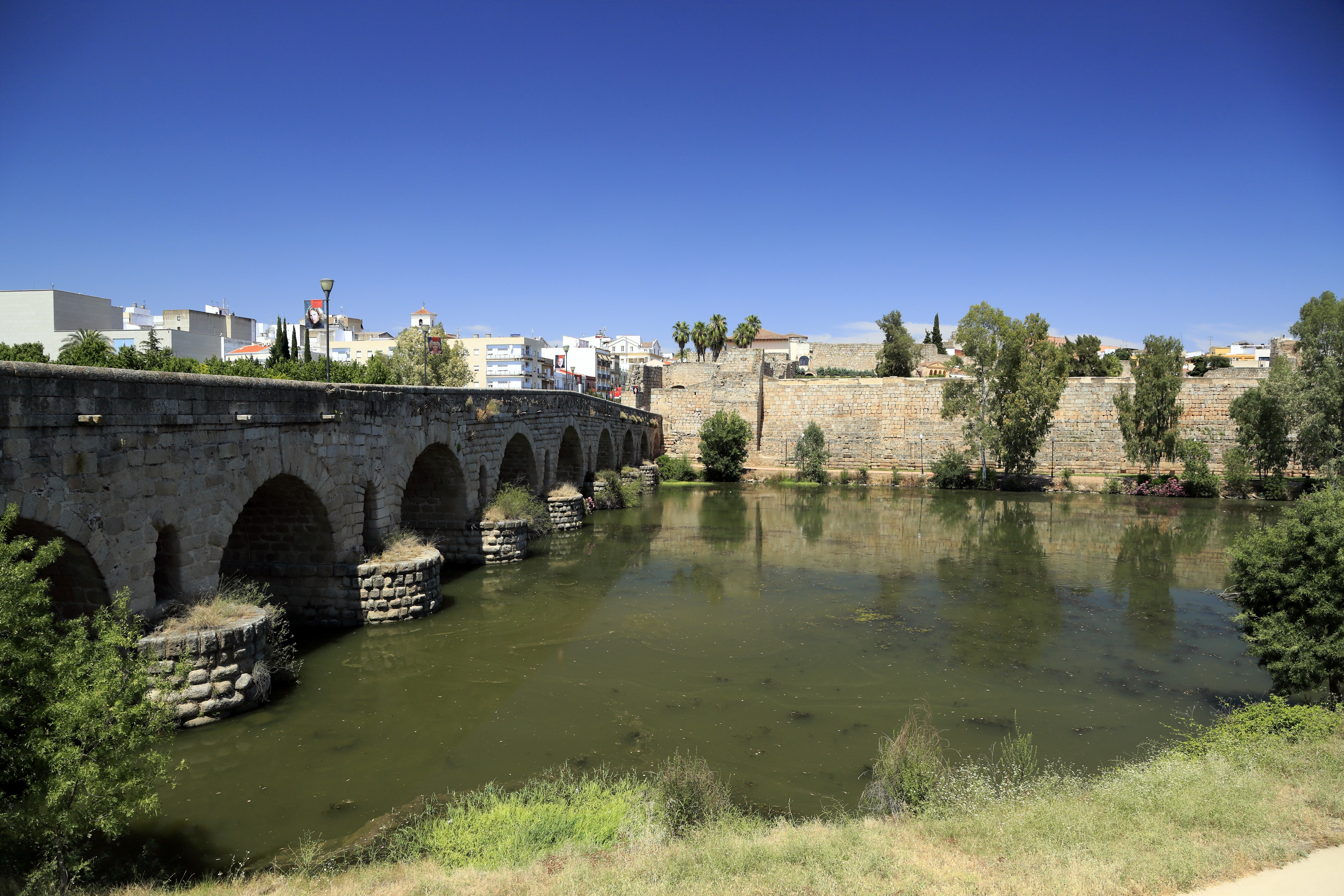
Guadiana, roman bridge and Mérida

It is not entirely clear who commanded the rebel troops during the battle of Mérida. Some historians claim that it was Yagüe, who reportedly had his headquarters located in Almendralejo. However, other authors maintain that the overall command was with Asensio, as Yagüe remained in Seville and arrived in Mérida as late as August 12. The operation commenced during very early hours of the day, when two separate rebel groups supposed to ford the Guadiana departed from Almendralejo; they soon passed through the villages of Alange and La Zarza. Tella managed to cross the river before dawn, but Asensio failed to get his trucks and artillery across; he had to return to the main road, regroup and follow Castejón, who at the time was already engaged in fire exchange, in preparations to storm Puente Romano.

Around mid-day the legionnaires managed to cross the river and close combat moved into the inner city. Single aircraft from both sides flew combat missions, but with little impact. As Tella's units attacked from the east, in the afternoon the resistance started to disintegrate; some defenders went on fighting, but some tried to flee and some surrendered. The last radio message was sent in mid-afternoon; Rodríguez Medina managed to leave the city with few hundred defenders. Around 7 PM Mérida (some 18,000 inhabitants) was fully controlled by the rebels; they commenced house-to-house search for last defenders. The loyalists left some 200 KIA; the rebel casualties were below 10 KIA.

In numerous sources the fall of Mérida is acknowledged as the moment when Franco's troops made contact with the forces of Mola, effectively connecting the northern and the southern rebel zones. However, exactly when and where this happened is not clear. Some authors note cautiously that the connection was established "shortly afterwards". The most detailed account available has it that when the battle was raging on, a force assembled in rebel-held Cáceres and led by major José de Linos left the city towards Mérida. They made some 35 km to the southernmost city held by the rebels, Alcuésar, and proceeded into the loyalist area. In the first village along the main road, Aljucén, they were offered resistance, which collapsed after some 2 hours. The next village, Carrascalejo, was already taken with no combat. The battlegroup of de Linos reached Mérida from the north in the early evening hours. Immediately afterwards telegraph and telephone connections have been established, and 28 trucks with soldiers and supplies, carried by Columna Madrid, departed northwards.

== Outcome ==
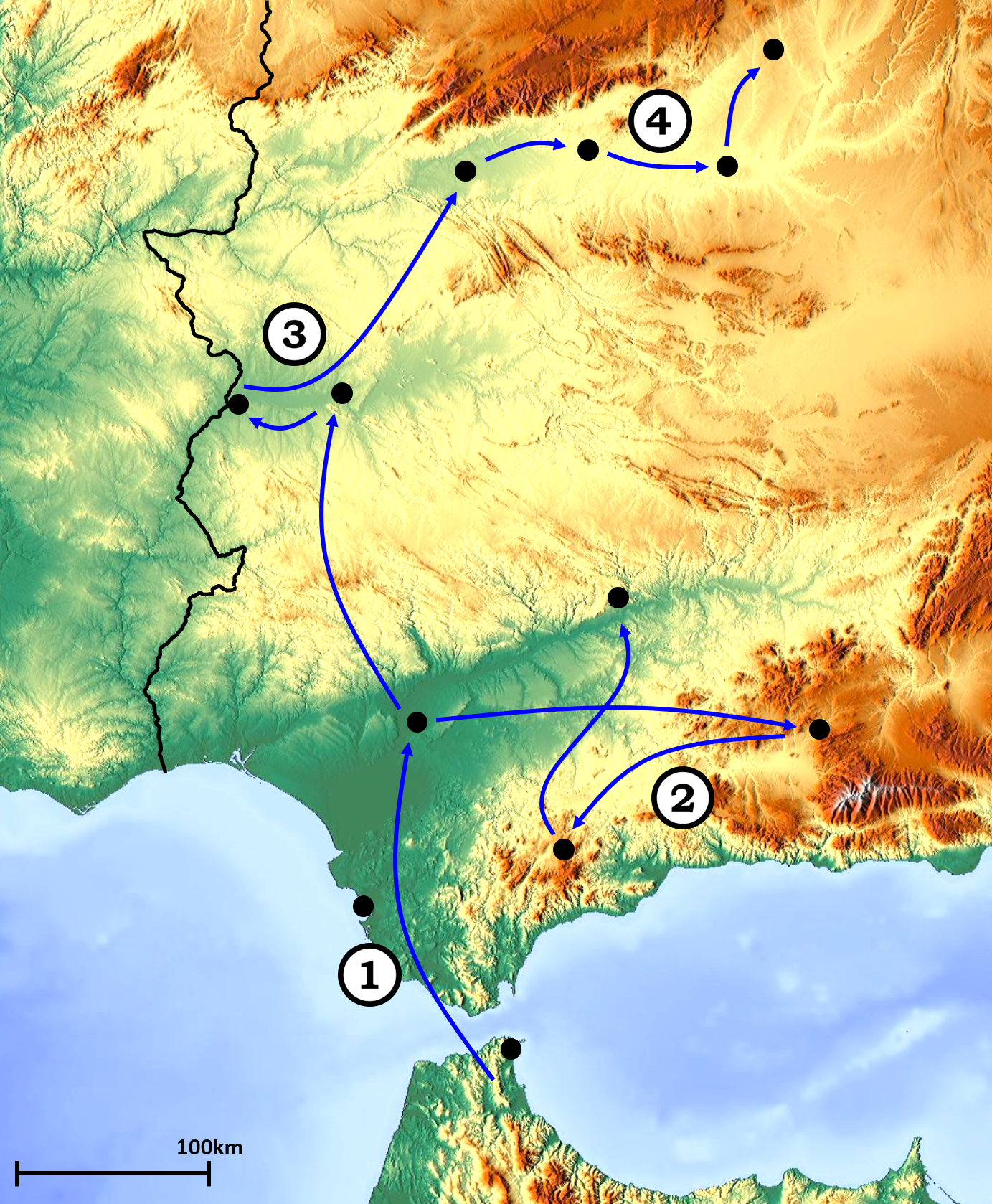
Mérida raid as part of Nationalist offensive from Seville to Madrid

During nine days Franco's battlegroup completed the raid of some 180 km, except the 30-km-long section between Seville and Garrobo all across the enemy-held territory; such operation would never be repeated by any formation during the entire war, and also Yagüe's later advance on the way towards Toledo and Madrid slowed down dramatically. This pace was possible mostly because of drastic chaos, disorganization and lack of command among the loyalists. Though in north-western Andalusia and in the Badajoz province they had probably some 20,000 men under arms, they were defeated by a force of 5,000 men at most. Even though the loyalists had sizeable groups of Guardia Civil, Guardia de Asalto and Carabineros at their disposal, most of their troops were barely disciplined, untrained and underarmed militiamen. Except few attempts by Puigdengolas to mount a major co-ordinated action, in most cases the rebels fought against loose, makeshift groups, which enabled Asensio and Castejón to defeat the much more numerous opponent piecemeal. This was also possible as the rebels were professional soldiers and well-trained volunteers, organized in military formations and fully equipped, including sections of machine-guns, mortars, artillery and armored cars, let alone pioneer, communications and medical services. During the entire campaign from Seville to Mérida, they have lost no more than 40 KIA; among the loyalists the figure was probably in the range of a few hundred, perhaps around 500.

The raid was paramount for the course of the war. Before, the rebels were divided into two zones. In the larger northern one they were barely capable of any offensive action, as they were running dramatically short of ammunition. In the southern enclave they seemed well established, yet its relatively small size rendered the enclave vulnerable to a co-ordinated enemy offensive. The Extremadura offensive linked both zones, enabling better resource management, enhancing flexibility and gaining critical mass; it also provided a launchpad for future offensive directly into the Castilian meseta, towards Madrid. In terms of personal arrangements among the rebels, the offensive elevated Franco from one of a few key commanding generals to the one which clearly emerged as the leading one. For the loyalists, initially the campaign might not have looked like a disaster; they lost a sizeable territory of some 6,000 square kilometers, yet this was area of little industrial value and with almost no major urban centers. They still held a large part of Extremadura, now turned into a cut-off enclave and with Badajoz as the key city, next to the Portuguese frontier. Mérida was still almost 300 km away from Madrid and rebel success there might have seemed of secondary importance, especially that in Sierra de Guadarrama the insurgent troops were merely 50 km from Puerta del Sol. It would be only in September and October when the government realized that the greatest threat to Madrid would come not from the north, but from Extremadura.

== See also ==
- Battle of Mérida
- Extremadura campaign
- Battle of Almendralejo
