= Andalusia campaign =

Spanish civil war campaigns

- Part of the Spanish Civil War
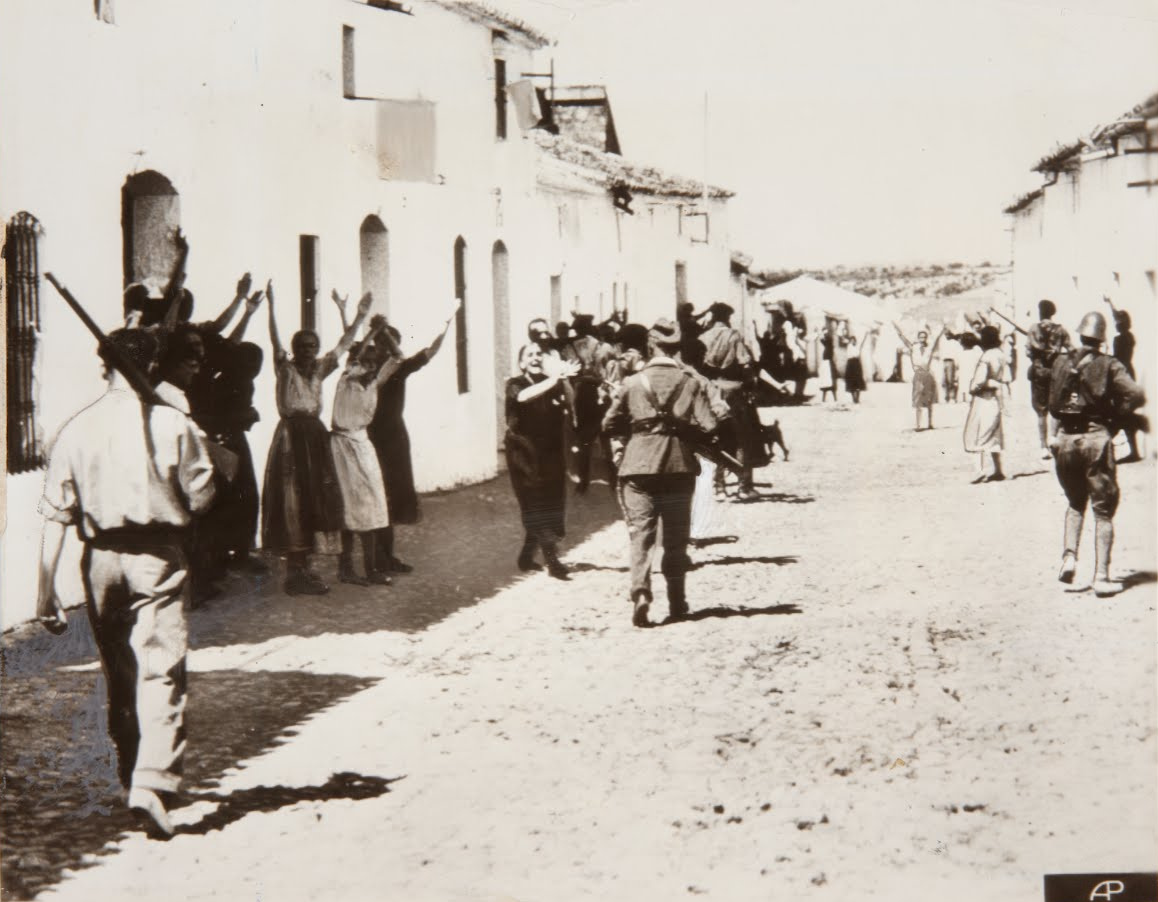
- Women of Constantina imploring mercy from the rebels
Date	July – October 1936
Location	Andalusia, Spain
Result	Nationalist victory

Belligerents
(Francoist Spain) Nationalist Spain	(Spain) Spanish Republic

Commanders and leaders
Gonzalo Queipo de Llano; José Enrique Varela; Antonio Castejón	José Miaja

Strength
Unknown	Unknown

Casualties and losses
Unknown	Unknown

The Andalusia Campaign refers to the set of military operations that took place in Andalusia between the nationalist and republican forces, during the first months of the Spanish Civil War.

The military coup had managed to triumph in several Andalusian provincial capitals —Seville, Córdoba, Granada or Cádiz—, but most of the territory remained loyal to the Republic. The arrival of powerful reinforcements from the Army of Africa and the inability of the republican forces allowed the rebels to gain control of most of western Andalusia, uniting the main centers that they controlled. However, the bulk of the rebel forces headed towards Extremadura and the central area of the peninsula, so the Andalusian front would end up becoming a secondary sector during the rest of the contest.

== Background ==
On July 17, in the afternoon, the military garrison of Melilla unexpectedly revolted. After Melilla, the other places of the protectorate of Morocco followed, and then the day following the uprising of the garrison of the Canary Islands took place, under the command of General Francisco Franco

That day the uprising spread to the Iberian Peninsula. At two in the afternoon on July 18, a part of the Seville garrison revolted against the Government. General Queipo de Llano, main leader of the conspiracy in Andalusia, arrested the commanders of the II Organic Division and took control of it. Although he encountered strong popular resistance in various parts of the city, Queipo de Llano managed to dominate the urban center and the Tablada airfield. He then gave the order to the remaining Andalusian garrisons to revolt, without waiting until the 19th as planned in Emilio Mola. A few hours later, in the city of Córdoba, Colonel Ciriaco Cascajo revolted the artillery regiment and proclaimed a state of war, managing to dominate the city. Throughout In the afternoon the garrisons of Cádiz (general José López-Pinto), Jerez de la Frontera (commander Salvador de Arizón), Algeciras (lieutenant colonel Manuel Coco) and Málaga (general Francisco Patxot). The uprising in the capital of Malaga failed miserably and left this province under government control; On the contrary, the triumph of the uprising in the province of Cádiz gave the opportunity to cross the Strait of Gibraltar to some units of the Army of Africa that would be decisive.

The garrison of Granada revolted finally on the afternoon of July 20, and managed to take full control of the city only several days later, after subduing popular resistance. For their part, Huelva, Jaén and Almería remained faithful to the republican authorities, despite the failed attempt at rebellion in Almería.

== Development of operations ==
=== Seville, base of operations ===
On the afternoon of July 22, the rebel forces managed to secure control of Seville. This allowed them to have a very important base of operations in the south of Spain, as well as an important logistics and communications center. From Seville, various expeditions began to be sent to the surrounding towns in order to ensure control of the capital of Seville. On the 19th they managed to conquer Dos Hermanas. Two days later a column of regulars was rejected in Carmona by anarchist militias, although this town would finally be taken the following day after being subjected to intense artillery fire. These movements were important, since the conquest of Dos Hermanas made it possible to secure communications from Seville with Cádiz, while Carmona assured them communications with Córdoba. On the 22nd also Arahal fell, after which between 146 and 1,600 people were executed. On August 7, a column from Seville to conquer Lora del Río, which fell the next day after a brief artillery and aerial bombardment. In revenge for the murders that some leftists had carried out after the outbreak of the war, the conquerors undertook a very harsh repression: between 600 and 1,000 people were shot, sometimes entire families were executed.

A column commanded by Lieutenant Colonel Castejón left Seville heading east, and in a series of raids his forces managed to conquer Alcalá de Guadaira, La Puebla de Cazalla, and Morón de la Frontera, Écija, Osuna, Estepa and La Roda. The taking of Alcalá de Guadaira was significant, due to its important bakery production. In another action, on July 26, Castejón's forces took the Huelva town of La Palma del Condado, after a brief bombardment.

From Huelva the republican authorities organized a column of miners and civil guards with the intention of quelling the uprising in Seville. The column left Huelva and picked up volunteers on its way to the capital of Seville, but on the morning of July 19 it suffered an ambush in La Pañoleta, near Camas, and was practically destroyed. Shortly after, the rebels organized a column under the command of Lieutenant Commander Ramón de Carranza, who in a quick raid would end up taking Huelva on July 29. The rebels led by Carranza entered the city after discovering that many of the republican authorities had fled by sea. With this action, the majority of towns that went to the Portuguese border fell into the hands of the rebel columns. Next, the rebels launched themselves into the mining basins of Tharsis mining basin and Riotinto mining basin, of great strategic importance. The rest of the province remained in Republican hands until the end of August. The resistance in the mining regions was very tough, despite the serious military inferiority in which the militias found themselves. On September 19, 1936, with the taking of Cumbres de Enmedio, Cumbres Mayores and Hinojales it was considered occupied the entire province.

In Cádiz the rebels dominated from the first days Cádiz and its naval base, Algeciras, Jerez de la Frontera and other important towns. There were important pockets of resistance in places like San Fernando or La Línea de la Concepción, where they even had to send the 2nd Tabor of Regulars of Ceuta. The arrival of reinforcements from the Army of Africa and the formation of local militias made it possible to ensure control of the rest of the province of Cádiz by the end of August. In fact, for the August 18, most of the cities or towns in Cadiz were under the control of the rebel forces. The repression in the province was especially harsh: in almost all towns there were executions. The Tercio Mora-Figueroa stood out for its actions, which conquered several towns in its advance to the Serranía de Ronda.

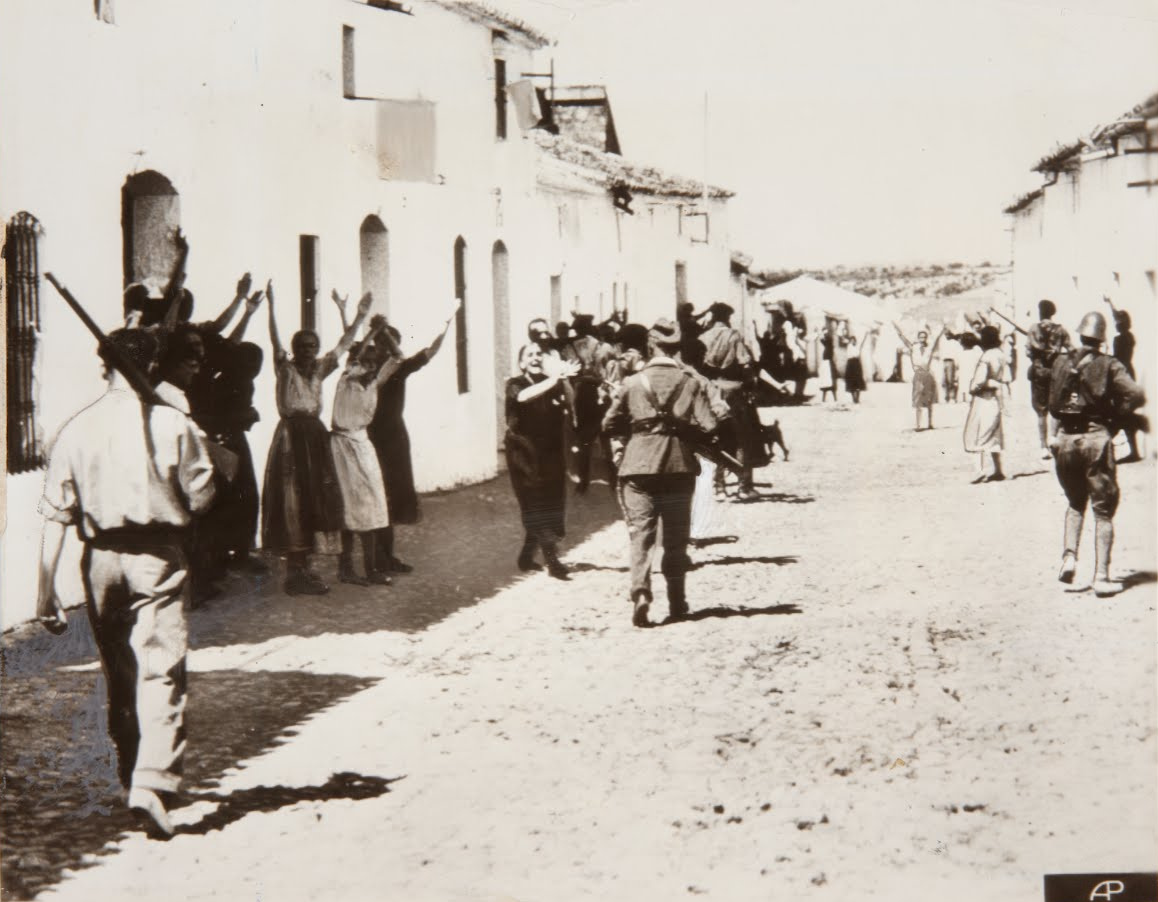
Women of Constantina imploring mercy from the rebels (1936).

Since the end of July, Nazi Germany and Fascist Italy had provided transport planes to the rebels to transport the troops of the Army of Africa to the Iberian Peninsula. Between July 29 and August 5, the airlift managed to transport some 1,500 African troops. From that day on, the number of soldiers transported by air daily to the peninsula was 500. Furthermore, on August 5 a convoy rebellious managed to cross the Strait of Gibraltar and transfer another 3,000 African soldiers to the peninsula along with all their equipment. With all these troops a powerful military column could be organized that He left Seville on August 2 and headed to Extremadura, under the command of Lieutenant Colonel Juan Yagüe. On their way they managed to conquer some towns in the mountains, such as Cazalla or Constantina; the latter was captured on August 9, after which the rebel forces unleashed a brutal repression. Previously, after the uprising, the Popular Front militias had carried out 92 murders. which led to the murder of some 990 people.

These rapid advances by the rebellious columns managed, already at the end of July, to dominate a large territory that went from the Portuguese border to Huelva and Seville, and from there to Algeciras. This allowed the rebels to link together some of the original centers of the uprising, constituting an important «beachhead» in the southern territory of Spain.

=== Granada Front ===
By July 25, the rebels already controlled Granada and the surrounding towns, but they found themselves isolated in the middle of the republican zone, since most of the province remained faithful to the Republic. During the first days of the war the front line passed by Güéjar Sierra, Sierra Nevada, Órgiva, La Malahá, Santa Fe, Láchar , Íllora, Cogollos Vega, Huétor Santillán, Beas, Dúdar and Quéntar. In some points the Republicans were only eight kilometers from the urban center. In the capital of Granada the rebel forces did not have a large number of forces and within the city they were still There are many supporters or possible sympathizers of the Republic. On the outskirts of Granada, the town of Víznar became an important strategic point for the rebels since from there they could intercept all possible Republican incursions into Granada, especially from the mountainous positions that the Republic had to the north of the city. During the rest of the contest the Republicans kept these positions under their control, which did not suffer any significant alteration. Despite its proximity to the war front, Víznar also became famous for being a place where the rebels took many of their victims to be shot.

With the city surrounded by Republican territory, they tried to recover it. During the first days the government forces carried out several aerial bombardments over the city. On July 30, a column of militiamen tried to reconquer Granada by attacking the sector of Huétor Santillán, but these were rejected by the defenders; The militiamen withdrew, leaving behind a good number of dead and a large amount of abandoned weapons. That was the only significant Republican attempt to recover the city. At the beginning of August a flag of the Legion was sent by air and garrisoned in the city to reinforce its defense.

=== Córdoba Front ===
After the triumph of the uprising in the capital of Cordoba, an important part of the province remains faithful to the Republic. Numerous municipalities initially fell into the hands of the rebels, but after the On July 21, many of the rebellious towns would once again be under Republican control: that same day Nueva Carteya, Santa Eufemia and Pedro Abad fell. On the 22nd, peasants from Espejo and Castro del Río take control of the towns after massacring the most prominent right-wingers; Montoro and Villafranca de Córdoba also fell; On July 23, Posadas and Puente Genil returned to Republican control after a strong fight. Despite this, several towns in the province remained under the control of the rebels. In the capital of the province, the garrison was very small and barely had support from other rebel troops.

In the core of the mining basin in the north of the province, Peñarroya-Pueblonuevo, a union congress was scheduled to be held and a large number of mining union leaders were there. The congress was suspended, but Peñarroya became the center of operations for the north of the province and for the mining militias. Although it was planned, the Civil Guard in the area finally did not join the rebels. From Peñarroya an attempt was made to reconquer the provincial capital, although the attempts were unsuccessful. to prosper and the attempts focused more on reconquering nearby towns that had revolted, such as Villaviciosa. The local Defense Committee constituted the « Terrible Battalion", although it took a long time to be definitively organized and able to act on the front. The deputy Eduardo Blanco, who became one of the republican leaders in the north of the province, moved to Madrid to try to obtain weapons and ammunition.

On August 1, a column from Seville under the command of Lieutenant Colonel Castejón advanced on Puente Genil, a town that it managed to take without much difficulty despite the strong resistance offered by its inhabitants. Something similar happened in Baena, which after initially being dominated by an anarchist committee, on July 28 was taken with blood and fire by a column commanded by Sáenz de Buruaga.

=== Varela Offensive ===
After gathering enough African troops, at the beginning of August General José Enrique Varela launched an offensive with the intention of establishing communications between Seville, Cádiz, Córdoba and Granada. At the head of a tabor of Moroccans, composed of about 400 troops, Varela managed to cross Andalusia and headed to Granada.Antequera fell on August 12, followed by Loja and Archidona. Finally, the threat that loomed over the capital of Granada ended when in the middle of the month Varela's forces managed to unite the city with the rest of the rebellious area. That meant isolation geographic of the province of Malaga. However, Varela's forces did not head towards the capital of Malaga. Varela received the order to go to Córdoba to reinforce the local garrison.

This meant that Varela assumed control of the rebellious columns that operated in the province of Córdoba. On the way to the capital of Córdoba he conquered the town of Castro del Río, after overcoming the resistance of local militias. The column's operations extended during the months of August and September, with his troops also participating in repression work in the rear. At the beginning of September his forces returned to the south, to the Malaga sector. Ronda fell on September 16, causing a massive flight of civilians towards Malaga. Moroccan troops managed to prevent the militiamen from dynamiting the bridge known as new bridge.

As they advanced, in the rear the rebels reorganized the police and repressive services. In some territories, a "Volunteer Mounted Police" was organized under the direction of Colonel Juan Seguí, made up of landowners and in charge of carrying out surveillance and repression in the rear. The bullfighter José García Carranza «el Algabeño» took charge of this Volunteer Mounted Police, by appointment of Queipo de Llano; During the time he was in charge of this "mounted police" he had a prominent participation in the repression of the rear, cooperating with Varela's forces.

=== Republican response: the Miaja column ===
The republican government, aware that it did not have organized military forces in Andalusia, organized the sending of a column to the south. General José Miaja was in charge of directing this column, which was nourished by military forces from Castellón, Alcoy, Alicante, Murcia and Cartagena. All of these forces joined in Albacete, from where they marched through the provinces of Ciudad Real, Jaén and Córdoba, picking up militia volunteers along the way. The advance of Miaja's forces was very slow. On July 28, the column reached Montoro, where its advance was stopped. Despite its military superiority, Miaja did not launch any attack on the capital of Cordoba and he dedicated himself more to carrying out small tactical operations in the Valle de los Pedroches area, where the republican forces recovered Adamuz (August 10), Belalcázar (August 14), Villanueva del Duque, Hinojosa del Duque and Pozoblanco (August 15).

On August 20, Miaja launched an offensive against Córdoba. If the city's garrison had initially been very weak, by then it had been reinforced enough to be able to resist a powerful attack. General Varela's forces reinforced the positions in Alcolea, which were a critical point during the attack. The republican columns, especially the one led by Pérez Salas, managed to approach the outskirts of the city, but were unable to penetrate it. Planes from the Tableda Airfield decimated Pérez Salas' column when it was barely eight kilometers from the urban center. The attack It was terminated on August 22. Shortly after, the rebellious units counterattacked and took the towns located around Córdoba; In many towns after the conquest, strong repression was unleashed. For example, in Palma del Río a local landowner murdered 300 Republican sympathizers. Varela's forces conquered Cerro Muriano on September 6, after a bloody assault by the Moroccan troops. Very broken, the Republican forces withdrew towards Montoro. This failure distanced the threat that loomed over the capital of Cordoba, while the republican forces did not launch any new offensive. Shortly after, Miaja was dismissed and placed at the head of the military government of Valencia.

Despite sending the Miaja column to the South, the Republicans were unable to regain control of western Andalusia.

=== Fighting in Peñarroya ===
In mid-October the rebel forces began a new offensive in the north of the Córdoba province. Various forces were organized. A column under the command of Álvarez Rementería attacked from Hornachuelos, while Sáenz de Buruaga's column attacked from El Vacar; From the north of the province of Seville, two other columns left and marched towards Fuente Obejuna. The objective was to converge in Peñarroya, conquer the town and ensure control of the mining basin.

The republican militias in the area were unable to stop the advance, which caused a massive flight of civilians towards Pozoblanco, Villanueva de Córdoba or Puertollano. On the night of October 12 to 13, the evacuation of Peñarroya-Pueblonuevo was organized; the local authorities of the Popular Front decided that the mines and local industry would not be destroyed. Peñarroya finally fell into the hands of the rebels on October 14, and two days later it was visited by Queipo de Llano himself, who gave a speech from the balcony of the City Hall. With this the rebels took control of the important mining basin in the north of the province. Although the directors of the Sociedad Minero Metalúrgica de Peñarroya (SMMP) sympathized with the rebels, not everything was happy: the majority of workers and Technicians had fled Peñarroya and the company was momentarily left without qualified personnel.

This was the last major offensive before the Battle of Madrid.

== Consequences ==
Towards the autumn of 1936, the rebel advances in Andalusia subsided, consolidating their conquests. Seville had constituted an important base of operations from which various rebellious offensives departed from Huelva, the Ronda mountain range, the Guadalquivir valley, Extremadura and Madrid. By then the « rebels" had managed to take control of the provinces of Cádiz, Huelva and Seville, as well as part of the provinces of Córdoba and Granada, and the northern strip of the province of Málaga. In addition, the rebels had an important logistics, industrial and military center in Seville (Note: Seidman (2011). p. 177-178: A year after the beginning of the war, the province of Seville has had the greatest industrial growth in Spain that year and also became the headquarters of several foreign firms.) Queipo de Llano also had the Pirotecnia de Sevilla, which one year had considerably increased arms production. with the ports of Algeciras, Cádiz, Huelva and Seville—in addition to the San Fernando Naval Base—, and with the important mining basins of Tharsis-Riotinto mining basin and Peñarroya-Pueblonuevo coal basin. In Seville the rebels had the important Military Pyrotechnics, while in Granada they controlled the Gunpowder and Explosives Factory of El Fargue, which was the largest explosives factory of Andalusia.

On the contrary, most of eastern Andalusia, as well as part of the province of Córdoba and almost all of the province of Málaga remained under republican control. In Malaga the Republicans had an important port. However, Málaga and its province were virtually isolated from the republican zone.

General Gonzalo Queipo de Llano was appointed commander of the Army of the South and became one of the main leaders of the insurrection zone. In fact, he ended up becoming a kind of Andalusian viceroy, given the powers he had and the broad autonomy with which he administered the Andalusian provinces.

However, by the fall of 1936 the bulk of military operations were around the capital of Spain, where an important battle was about to take place. In contrast to the situation of the previous summer, Andalusia became a secondary front although it continued to have a certain role. Within the republican zone a group of civil guards and their families resisted under siege in a sanctuary near Andújar. Still at the end of the year Queipo de Llano launched a limited offensive in the Córdoba sector to try to link with Jaén and liberate the besieged Andújar, although the attack did not achieve its objectives.

== Sources ==
- Julio Aróstegui (2006). Why July 18… And then. Barcelona: Flower of the Wind Editions. ISBN 84-96495-13-2.
- Burnett Bolloten (1991). The Spanish Civil War: Revolution and Counterrevolution. The University of North Carolina Press. ISBN 978-1-4696-2446-4.
- Antony Beevor (2006). The Battle for Spain. The Spanish civil war, 1936–1939. Londres: Penguin Books. ISBN 978-0-14-303765-1.
- Helen Graham (2005). The Spanish Civil War. A very short introduction. Oxford University Press. ISBN 978-0-19-280377-1.
- Hugh Thomas (1976). History of the Spanish Civil War. Barcelona: Book club. ISBN 84-226-0874-X.
- Francisco Espinosa (2003). The column of death. The advance of Franco's army from Seville to Badajoz. Barcelona: Crítica. ISBN 84-8432-431-1.
- Manuel Ángel (2009). Mining conflicts in Alto Guadiato, 1881-1936. Sevilla: Andalusian Studies Center. ISBN 978-84-612-9794-8.
- Jackson, Gabriel (2010). The Spanish Republic and the civil war. Barcelona: Crítica. ISBN 978-84-08-05500-6.
- Juan (2006). From the military coup to the Civil War: Seville 1936. RD Editores. ISBN 8493474185.
- Nicolás (1992). Seville was the key: republic, uprising, Civil War (1931-1939). Castillejo. ISBN 8480580003.
- Seidman, Michael (2011). The national victory. Madrid: Editorial Alliance. ISBN 978-84-206-0863-1.
