= Battle of Mérida =

Battle in the Spanish Civil War

Coordinates: 38°54′N 6°20′W

- Part of the Spanish Civil War
Date	10–11 August 1936
Location	Mérida, Extremadura, Spain
Result	Nationalist victory

Belligerents
(Spain) Second Spanish Republic	(Francoist Spain) Nationalist rebels

Commanders and leaders
Cpt. Carlos Rodríguez Medina	Lt. Col. Carlos Asensio; Lt. Col. Heli Rolando de Tella

Strength
2,000 militia and assault guards	1,000 regulars

Casualties and losses
250	Unknown

The Battle of Mérida saw the Republican militia twice fail to halt the Spanish Army of Africa near the historic town of Mérida early in the Spanish Civil War.

The Nationalists beat the Republicans from the city on 10 August 1936 and secured control the following day, allowing General Juan Yagüe to surround and capture neighbouring Badajoz in the Battle of Badajoz several days later.

== Nationalist advance ==
The Nationalist army, under Colonel Carlos Asensio, assembled at Seville with assistance by German and Italian "advisors". The force began its Blitzkrieg-like drive northward on 2 August in trucks supplied by General Queipo de Llano. Major Antonio Castejón followed with a second column on 3 August.

Asensio raced north, smashing through fierce Republican resistance on 6 August. The next day, the Army of Africa captured the village of Almendralejo after a bloody struggle that decimated both sides. The Republicans retreated north to nearby Mérida, while the Nationalists waited for Castejón to arrive.

== The battle ==
On 10 August the Republican militia made another stand along the Guadiana River, several kilometers south of Mérida. Two banderas (IV Bandera and V Bandera) of the Spanish Foreign Legion and one tabor (II Tabor) of Moroccan Regulares took part in the battle. Before the attack, Mérida was subjected to powerful shelling from Nationalist artillery and aviation. The rebels then attacked the city from three directions: the IV Bandera from the south, crossing the Guadiana River after taking Alange and Zafra, the II Tabor from the east, and the V Bandera crossing the Puente Romano. The IV Bandera initially failed to cross the river, and retreated itself to Almendralejo, but the II Tabor entered the city.

In the meantime, Asensio, with the V Bandera, pushed forward and captured the bridge, then swept across the river and captured the city. The loyalist militia retreated rather than risk encirclement, and General Yagüe then arrived to take command of the rebel army. After the occupation of the city, Yagüe's troops carried out a bloody massacre. The committee of defense, led by Anita López was executed by the Nationalists.

Yagüe next moved west against Badajoz with Asensio and Castejón, leaving a detachment of soldiers under Major Heli Tella to hold Mérida. On 11 August the Republican militia reappeared with a strong contingent of Asaltos and Guardia Civil from Madrid. The Republicans attacked and were beaten by Tella's professional Legionnaires. Meanwhile, Yagüe's contingent took Badajoz by storm.

== Aftermath ==
After the occupation of Mérida and Badajoz, the Nationalists connected the Nationalist-held northern zone and the southern zone. Furthermore, the Nationalists occupied the western half of Badajoz province and the Republican government lost control of the Portuguese frontier. The Nationalists carried out harsh repression in the conquered territory.

== See also ==
- List of Spanish Nationalist military equipment of the Spanish Civil War
- List of Spanish Republican military equipment of the Spanish Civil War
- White Terror (Spain)
