= CP Monesterio =

Monesterio
- Full name: Club Polideportivo Monesterio
- Founded: 15 October 1962; 63 years ago
- Ground: Municipal, Monesterio, Extremadura, Spain
- Capacity: 1,000
- President: Urbano Martínez
- Manager: José Lancharro Mejías
- League: Segunda Extremeña – Group 4
- 2024–25: Segunda Extremeña – Group 5, 5th of 12
Home colours	Away colours

Club Polideportivo Monesterio is a Spanish football team based in Monesterio, in the autonomous community of Extremadura. Founded in 1962, they play in Segunda Extremeña – Group 4, holding home games at Campo de Fútbol Municipal de Monesterio.

== History ==
Founded on 15 October 1962 as Club Deportivo Monesterio, the club was later renamed Club Polideportivo Monesterio in 1973. In 1993, the club achieved a first-ever promotion to Tercera División.

== Season to season ==
Season	Tier	Division	Place	Copa del Rey
1973–74	5	2ª Reg.	15th	
1974–75	5	1ª Reg.	5th	
1975–76	5	1ª Reg.	3rd	
1976–77	5	1ª Reg.	2nd	
1977–78	5	1ª Reg.	2nd	
1978–79	6	1ª Reg.	15th	
1979–80	6	1ª Reg.	4th	
1980–81	6	1ª Reg.	10th	
1981–82	6	1ª Reg.	3rd	
1982–83	6	1ª Reg.	2nd	
1983–84	5	Reg. Pref.	9th	
1984–85	5	Reg. Pref.	10th	
1985–86	5	Reg. Pref.	6th	
1986–87	5	Reg. Pref.	15th	
1987–88	5	Reg. Pref.	5th	
1988–89	5	Reg. Pref.	12th	
1989–90	5	Reg. Pref.	12th	
1990–91	5	Reg. Pref.	9th	
1991–92	5	Reg. Pref.	16th	
1992–93	5	Reg. Pref.	2nd	

Season	Tier	Division	Place	Copa del Rey
1993–94	4	3ª	20th	
1994–95	5	Reg. Pref.	7th	
1995–96	5	Reg. Pref.	6th	
1996–97	5	Reg. Pref.	4th	
1997–98	5	Reg. Pref.	1st	
1998–99	4	3ª	10th	
1999–2000	4	3ª	12th	
2000–01	4	3ª	12th	
2001–02	4	3ª	14th	
2002–03	4	3ª	14th	
2003–04	4	3ª	17th	
2004–05	4	3ª	16th	
2005–06	4	3ª	17th	
2006–07	4	3ª	19th	
2007–08	5	Reg. Pref.	6th	
2008–09	5	Reg. Pref.	6th	
2009–10	5	Reg. Pref.	5th	
2010–11	5	Reg. Pref.	12th	
2011–12	5	Reg. Pref.	11th	
2012–13	5	Reg. Pref.	12th	

Season	Tier	Division	Place	Copa del Rey
2013–14	5	Reg. Pref.	9th	
2014–15	5	Reg. Pref.	8th	
2015–16	5	Reg. Pref.	16th	
2016–17	6	2ª Ext.	3rd	
2017–18	5	1ª Ext.	14th	
2018–19	6	2ª Ext.	4th	
2019–20	6	2ª Ext.	2nd	
2020–21	6	2ª Ext.	2nd	
2021–22	6	1ª Ext.	11th	
2022–23	6	1ª Ext.	12th	
2023–24	7	2ª Ext.	6th	
2024–25	7	2ª Ext.	5th	
2025–26	7	2ª Ext.		

- 10 seasons in Tercera División
