= Battle of the Sierra Guadalupe =

Coordinates: 39°29′N 5°24′W

- Part of the Spanish Civil War
Date	17–31 August 1936
Location	Area around Guadalupe, Trujillo and Navalmoral de la Mata in NE Extremadura, Spain
Result	Nationalist victory

Belligerents
Spanish Republic; Air Squadron "Spain"	(Spain) Nationalist rebels

Commanders and leaders
(Spain) Maj. Gen. José Riquelme y López-Bago; André Malraux	Lt. Col. Juan Yagüe; Lt. Col. Carlos Asensio; Lt. Col. Antonio Castejón; Lt. Col. Heliodoro Rolando de Tella

Strength
9,000 soldiers and militia 5–7 aircraft	4,000 regulares

Casualties and losses
High	Low

The Battle of the Sierra Guadalupe (English: Guadalupe Mountains), also known as the Tagus Campaign, was a continuation of the Nationalist Army's race north toward Madrid in the early stages of the Spanish Civil War. In mid-late August 1936, the three Regulares columns of General Yagüe's Army of Africa dashed through the Sierra de Guadalupe Mountains, also known as Sierra de Villuercas, in central Spain and forded across the Tagus River, capturing several towns and routing the Republicans in a succession of rapid advances.

== Background ==
On August 14, Badajoz fell to the Nationalists under General Yagüe, cutting off the Republic from Portugal. Ahead of him, several hundred miles to the northeast, across the broad Tagus River, gleamed Madrid, the aim and object of General Franco's lightning campaign. The Army of Africa's famous northward Marcha (or "March" - actually a fully motorized displacement), consequently, continued without pause into the hills and valleys sheltering Madrid.

To cover these southern approaches, the Republic deployed loyalist General Riquelme with the so-called "Army of Extremadura", a force of about 9,000 militia. Many of these troops had been redeployed in haste from the mountains of the Guadarrama front, and their condition deteriorated wretchedly in the Tagus River valley.

== The battle ==
The government militias, while unquestionably brave, were sorely deficient in training and equipment and proved unable to face the disciplined Spanish Foreign Legion and the feared Moroccan Regulares shock troops. Desertions bled the Republicans, who refused to dig trenches. Consequently, the Nationalists outmarched and outflanked the defenders, forcing perpetual retreats by threatening encirclement.

Riquelme's forces included 2,000 Anarchists who refused to take his orders and launched useless attacks along the San Vicente hills. On August 17, Major Heli Tella pushed through to Trujillo and crossed the Tagus at Almaraz. Guadalupe fell to Major Antonio Castejón on August 21.

According to the novel L'Espoir, at Medellín, a section of Colonel Carlos Asensio's column was surprised and savagely attacked by Republican aircraft under André Malraux, but on the whole resistance was minimal. By August 27, all three columns had concentrated at Navalmoral, where the Nationalists launched the war's first air raids on Madrid.

== See also ==
- List of Spanish Nationalist military equipment of the Spanish Civil War
- List of Spanish Republican military equipment of the Spanish Civil War

== Bibliography ==
- Thomas, Hugh. The Spanish Civil War. New York: Harper & Brothers, 1961.
