= Ildefonso Puigdendolas =

Spanish military officer

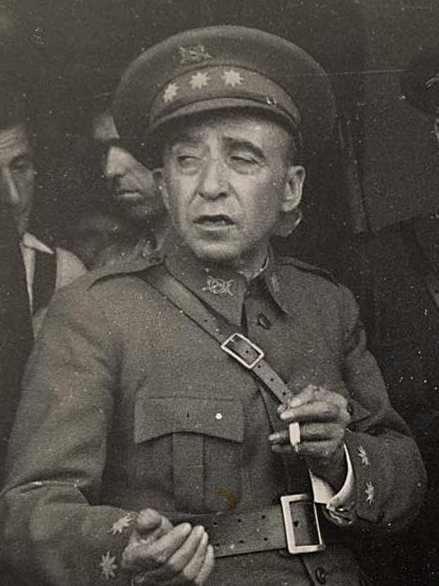
- Puigdengolas in 1936

Personal details
- Born: 1876 Girona, Spain
- Died: 31 October 1936 (aged 59–60) near Illescas, Spain
- Citizenship: Spanish
- Education: School of Corporals and Sergeants of the Colegio de María Cristina

Military service
- Allegiance: Kingdom of Spain (1892–1931); Spanish Republic (1931–1936)
- Branch/service: Spanish Army (1892–1931); Spanish Republican Army (1931–1936)
- Years of service: 1892-1936
- Rank: Colonel
- Battles/wars: Cuban War of Independence; Rif War; Sanjurjada; Spanish Civil War: Battle of Alcala de Henares; Extremadura campaign; Battle of Badajoz; Battle of Seseña (executed)

Colonel Ildefonso Puigdendolas Ponce de Leon (1876, in Girona – 31 October 1936, near Illescas) was a Spanish military officer who served the Republic during the Spanish Civil War.

== Early life ==
Ildefonso Puigdendolas was born in 1876 in Girona and became orphaned during his childhood. From a young age, Puigdendolas developed left-wing views. He also became a Freemason at a young age. Despite his young age, Puigdendolas participated in several duels including one against Vicente Blasco Ibáñez.

== Military career ==
In 1892, Puigdendolas entered the School of Corporals and Sergeants of the Colegio de María Cristina. In 1895, Puigdendolas lied about his age in order to fight in the Cuban War of Independence. He would later serve as a Lieutenant in the Rif War.

=== The Second Republic ===
In 1931, he became the Colonel of Infantry in Seville as part of the inspector of the security corps. In 1932, during the Sanjurjada, Puigdendolas personally confronted José Sanjurjo. In 1934 he was appointed to Malaga.

=== Spanish Civil War ===
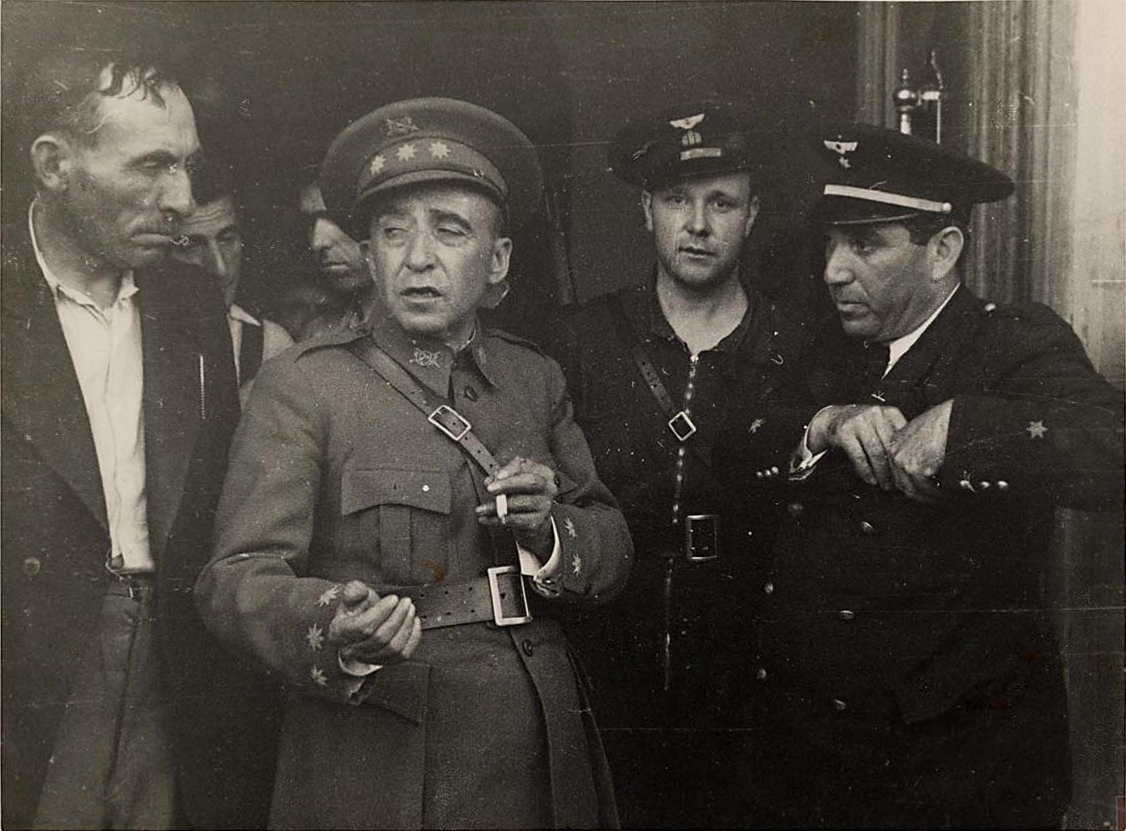
Puigdendolas in Alcalá de Henares on 21 July 1936

In July 1936 he defeated the rebels forces at Alcala de Henares and Guadalajara. After that, he assumed command of loyalist troops in the Badajoz province and tried to stop the rebel drive from Seville towards Merida; having failed this, he led the loyalist militia during the Battle of Badajoz in 1936. After the battle of Badajoz he escaped to Portugal and returned to the zone controlled by the Spanish Republican Army. During the Battle of Seseña Puigdendolas was killed by his own men when trying to prevent desertion.
