= Huétor Santillán =

- municipality
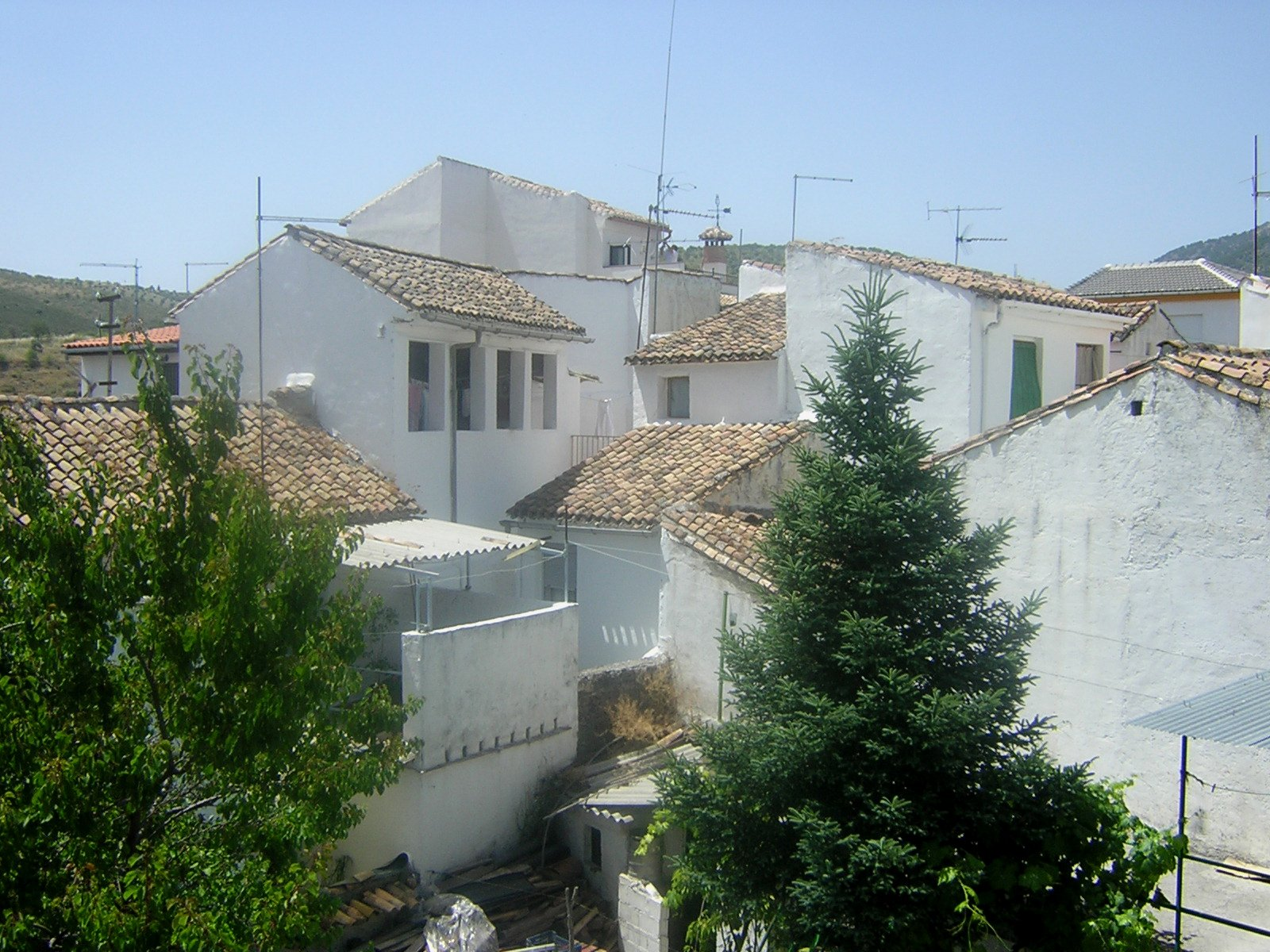

- Flag Coat of arms

- Location in Spain.
- Coordinates: 36°53′N 3°6′W
- Country: Spain
- Province: Granada
- Comarca: Vega de Granada

Government
  - Mayor: José Carlos Ortega Ocaña

Area
  - Total: 94 km^{2} (36 sq mi)
- Elevation: 1,015 m (3,330 ft)

Population (2025-01-01)
  - Total: 1,964
  - Density: 21/km^{2} (54/sq mi)
- Time zone: UTC+1 (CET)
  - Summer (DST): UTC+2 (CEST)

Huétor Santillán is a municipality located in the province of Granada, southern Spain. Its territory is located at the feet of the Sierra de Huétor, between the Sierra Arana and the Sierra de la Alfaguara mountain ranges.

The main attraction is the 16th-century church of the Incarnation.

== See also ==
- List of municipalities in Granada
