= Almendralejo =

- Municipality
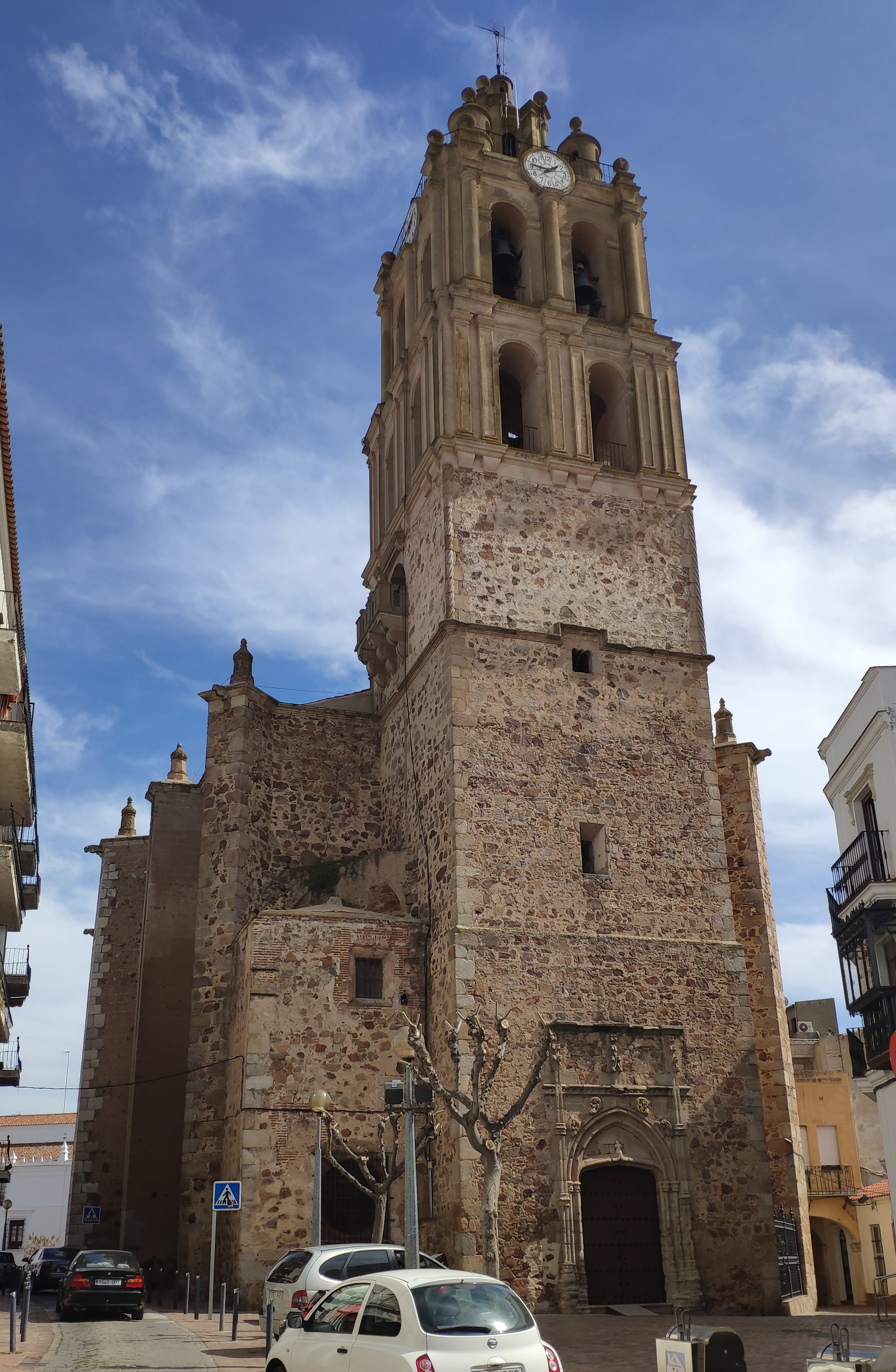
- Church of the Purification

- Flag Coat of arms

- Location of Almendralejo within Extremadura
- Coordinates: 38°41′N 6°25′W
- Country: Spain
- Autonomous community: Extremadura
- Province: Badajoz
- Comarca: Tierra de Barros

Government
  - Mayor: José María Ramírez (PSOE, 2023)

Area
  - Total: 164.5 km^{2} (63.5 sq mi)
- Elevation: 337 m (1,106 ft)

Population (2025-01-01)
  - Total: 34,587
  - Density: 210.3/km^{2} (544.6/sq mi)
- Demonym: Almendralejenses
- Time zone: UTC+1 (CET)
  - Summer (DST): UTC+2 (CEST)
- Postal code: 06200
- Official language(s): Spanish
- Website: Official website

Almendralejo (Spanish: [almendɾaˈlexo]) is a town in the Province of Badajoz, Extremadura, Spain. It is situated 45 km south-east of Badajoz, on the main road and rail route between Mérida and Seville. As of 2010, it has a population of 33,975. It was the site of a battle and massacre in 1936 during the Spanish Civil War.

== History ==
A fort covering 13,000 square meters with three concentric walls, three ditches, and 25 towers was constructed in the area 4,900 years ago. The fort was destroyed and the area burnt 400 years after its construction in 2450 BC. It is similar to the Los Millares site. No known human activity occurred in the area until the 100–200s AD. The Missorium of Theodosius I, one of the best surviving examples of late Roman imagery, was found here.

The "Albero de ferria" at Almendralejo, constructed in 1747, was one of the earliest examples of a large scale hydropower dam. It was 122 m (400 ft) long and 19.5 m (64 ft) high. It was a rubble-masonry structure and had several buttresses to strengthen it. Some of these were roofed over to house a mill and it was the first dam to contain a water wheel actually within its structure.

In the late 19th and early 20th century the town was an important centre for the trade in grain, fruit and wine, along the Mérida-Los Rosales railway, and the site of an important annual sheep fair.

There was a battle and massacre here in 1936 during the Spanish Civil War.

The future Queen Letizia of Spain married Alonso Guerrero Pérez, a writer and teacher in Almendralejo in 1998. The marriage was dissolved by divorce in 1999.

== Culture ==
Notable historical buildings of Almendralejo include the church of the Purification, the Iglesia Parroquial de Nuestra Señora de la Purificación, finished in 1515, in Gothic style. It has a well-proportioned tower and a seventeenth century retablo (devotional painting). The Palacio del Marqués de Monsalud is a seventeenth-century building now used as council offices. The building surrounds a central courtyard, and on the ground floor there are arches mounted on pink granite columns, and a pedestal decorated with eighteenth-century Seville tiles; on the first floor there is a red ceramic balustrade supported by small granite columns with arches. It was the birthplace of the revolutionary poet José de Espronceda, and houses a museum of Roman antiquities found in the region.

Carolina Coronado (full name: Victoria Carolina Coronado y Romero de Tejada) (12 December 1820 – 15 January 1911) was a Spanish writer, famous for her poetry, considered the equivalent of contemporary Romantic authors like Rosalía de Castro. As one of the most well-known poets writing in mid-19th-century Spain, she also played a diplomatic role. (She was married to Horatio Perry, the American Secretary of the U.S. Legation in Madrid.) She both negotiated with the Spanish royal family in private and, through a series of widely published poems, promoted the aims of the Lincoln administration, especially abolition of slavery.

== Geography ==
Almendralejo is situated about 45 km (28 mi) to the southeast of Badajoz on the railway line between Seville and Mérida. It is to the south of the River Guadiana on an extensive plain, with the slightly raised area to the south being known as the Tierra de Barros. The town grew rapidly at the end of the nineteenth century as the roads and railways were developed. It has broad streets and handsome buildings. The economy is centred on agriculture with extensive cultivation of cereals, fruit and grapes. There are many vineyards around the town, with a local red wine being produced, and the area is also known for the production of brandy.

=== Climate ===
Almendralejo has a mediterranean climate (Köppen: Csa), bodering on a cold semi-arid climate (BSk) with very hot, dry summers and mild winters. Autumn is the rainiest season. Temperatures below 0 °C (32 °F) and above 40 °C (104 °F) are common.

Climate data for Almendralejo (2008-2025), extremes (2008-present)
Month	Jan	Feb	Mar	Apr	May	Jun	Jul	Aug	Sep	Oct	Nov	Dec	Year
Record high °C (°F)	21.6 (70.9)	25.4 (77.7)	29.8 (85.6)	36.2 (97.2)	38.7 (101.7)	41.5 (106.7)	43.9 (111.0)	43.9 (111.0)	42.1 (107.8)	36.2 (97.2)	24.9 (76.8)	22.9 (73.2)	43.9 (111.0)
Mean daily maximum °C (°F)	13.0 (55.4)	15.3 (59.5)	18.0 (64.4)	21.3 (70.3)	26.2 (79.2)	31.0 (87.8)	34.8 (94.6)	35.0 (95.0)	29.7 (85.5)	24.6 (76.3)	17.0 (62.6)	13.9 (57.0)	23.3 (74.0)
Daily mean °C (°F)	8.5 (47.3)	10.0 (50.0)	12.4 (54.3)	15.4 (59.7)	19.3 (66.7)	23.5 (74.3)	26.5 (79.7)	26.9 (80.4)	22.9 (73.2)	18.8 (65.8)	12.5 (54.5)	9.5 (49.1)	17.2 (62.9)
Mean daily minimum °C (°F)	3.9 (39.0)	4.7 (40.5)	6.7 (44.1)	9.4 (48.9)	12.4 (54.3)	16.0 (60.8)	18.2 (64.8)	18.7 (65.7)	16.0 (60.8)	12.9 (55.2)	7.9 (46.2)	5.1 (41.2)	11.0 (51.8)
Record low °C (°F)	−5.3 (22.5)	−4.3 (24.3)	−2.6 (27.3)	2.2 (36.0)	4.3 (39.7)	8.9 (48.0)	11.8 (53.2)	12.6 (54.7)	8.0 (46.4)	3.1 (37.6)	−1.1 (30.0)	−4.7 (23.5)	−5.3 (22.5)
Average rainfall mm (inches)	41.9 (1.65)	32.0 (1.26)	59.3 (2.33)	46.2 (1.82)	25.4 (1.00)	10.6 (0.42)	1.3 (0.05)	4.3 (0.17)	24.6 (0.97)	61.9 (2.44)	48.6 (1.91)	50.2 (1.98)	406.3 (16)
Source: Agencia Estatal de Meteorologia (AEMET OpenData)

== Demographics ==
The graph below shows the change in population since 1842.

== Sport ==
CF Extremadura represented the town in domestic football competitions. Founded in 1924, they reached their peak in 1996 when they secured promotion for the 1996–97 La Liga season for the first time in their history. After relegation at the end of their inaugural season in La Liga, the club returned to the top division for the 1998–99 season, again failing to stay in the top division. Following several years of financial problems, the club folded eventually in 2010.

In 2007, another football club known as Extremadura UD was founded as a continuation of the financially struggling previous club. As of 2018, Extremadura UD are playing in the Segunda División (the second level of the Spanish football league system). With a capacity of 11,580 seats, Estadio Francisco de la Hera is the home ground of the club.

== Gallery ==
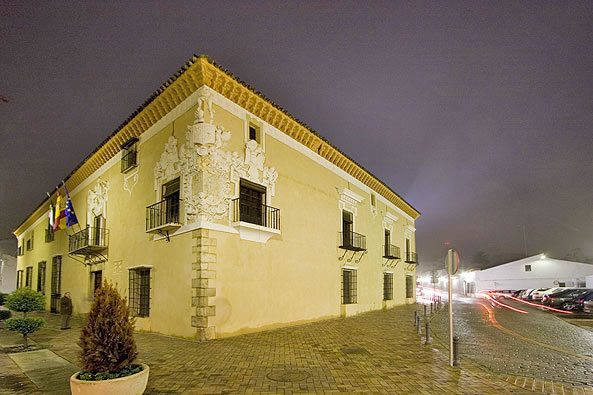
The town hall Palacio de Monsalud

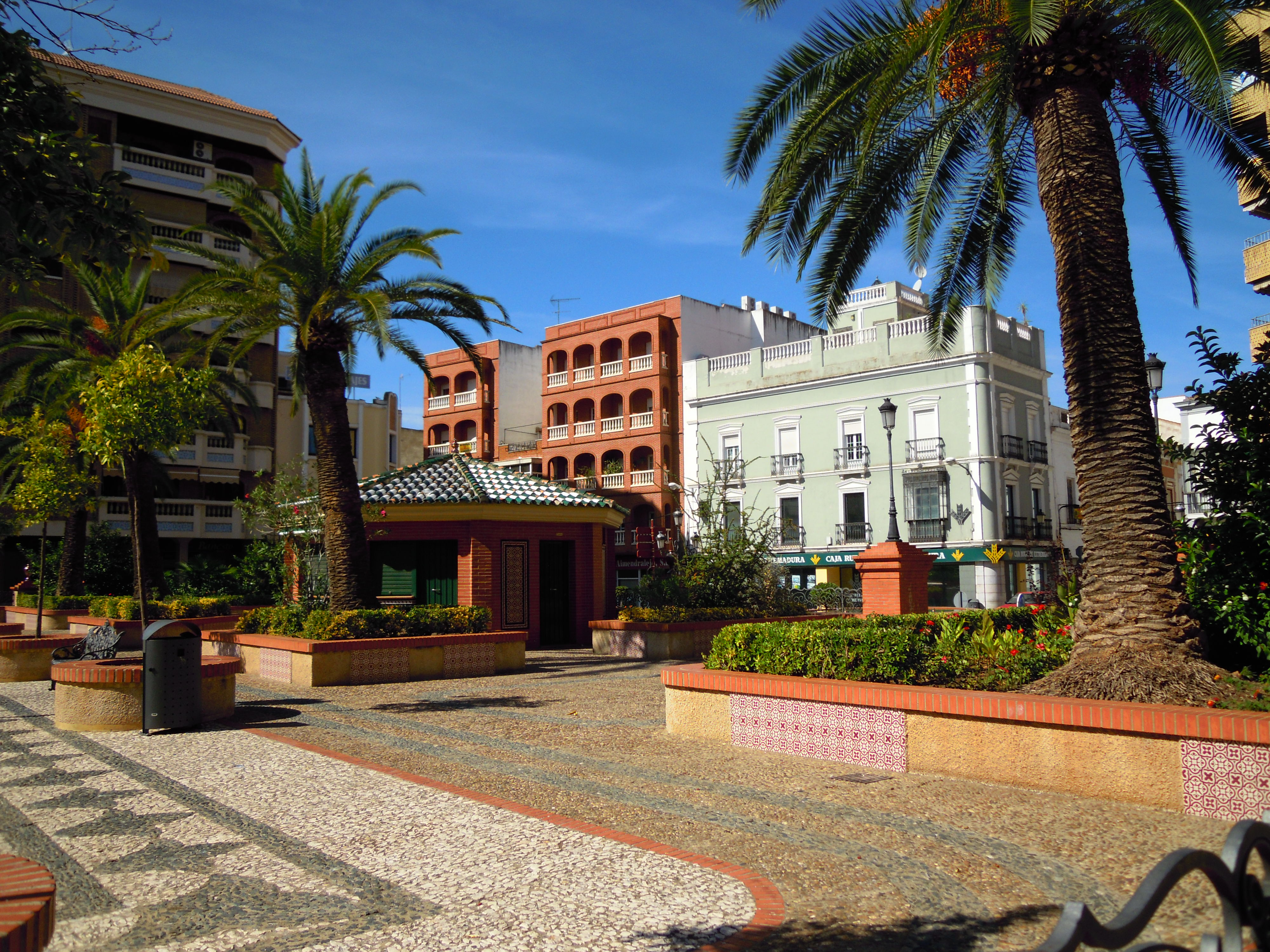
Plaza Esponceda

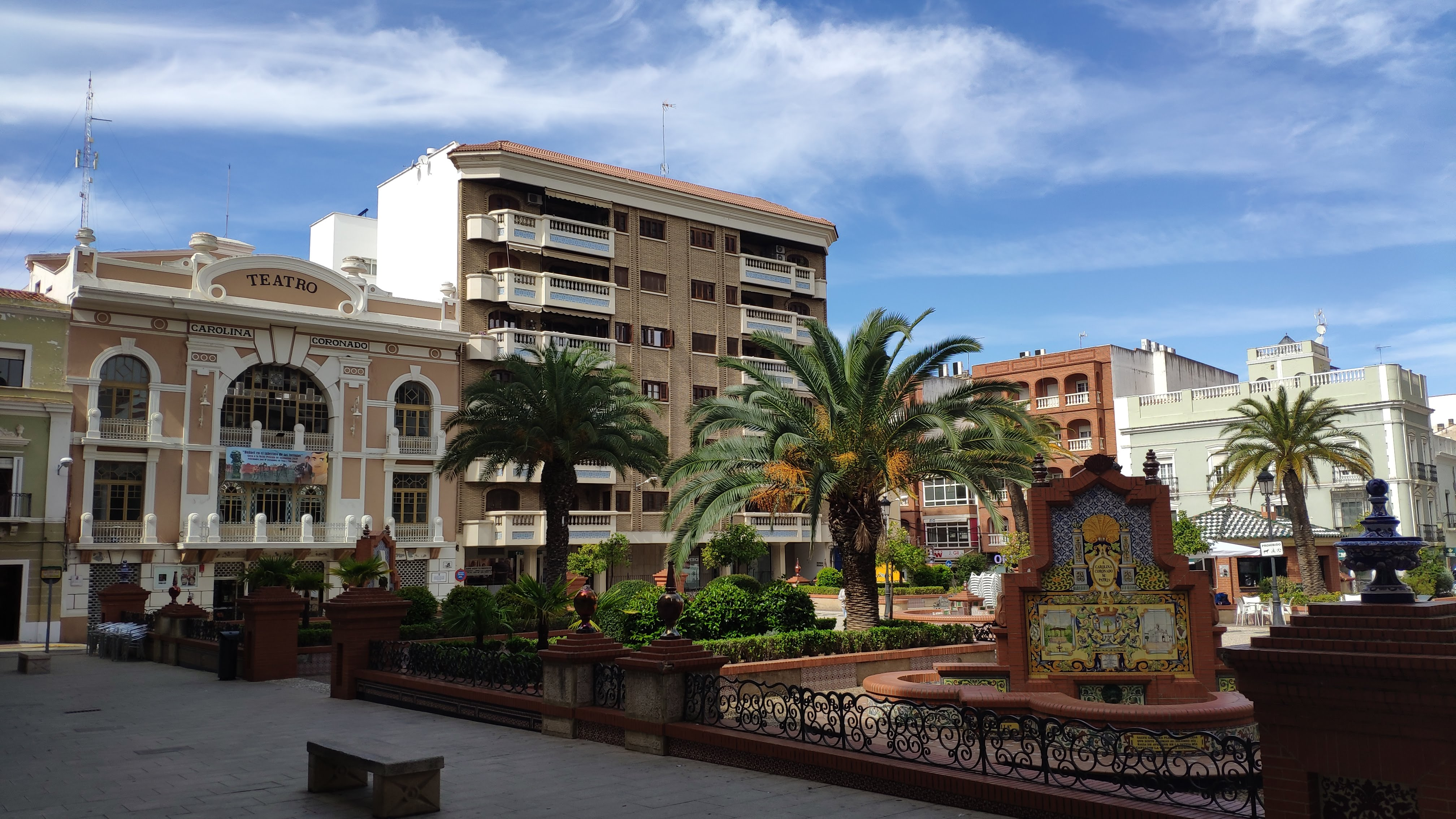
Carolina Coronado Theatre at Plaza Esponceda

== See also ==
- List of municipalities in Badajoz

== Works cited ==
- Olaya, Vicente (5 February 2025). "Uncovered in Spain: 5,000-year-old fortress with a violent past". El País. Archived from the original on 10 March 2025.
