= Heli Rolando de Tella y Cantos =

Spanish military officer

Heli Rolando de Tella y Cantos (14 September 1888 – 10 October 1967) was a decorated Spanish soldier and military officer who served in the Moroccan War and the Spanish Civil War, siding with Franco's Nationalists.

Tella, born to a family of Galician farmers, studied at the Toledo Infantry Academy in his youth and was deployed to Spanish Morocco after graduating from the Spanish Infantry Academy at Toledo. Tella's decorations for valour included a Military Merit Medal, awarded in 1923, and the San Fernando Cross, Spain's highest military honour in 1925. He received the latter for heroic actions in leading native Moroccan troops, Regulares, in battle.

He was strongly opposed to the Spanish Republic of 1931 and was one of the few officers to participate in the failed coup attempt of General Jose Sanjurjo of 10 August 1932. For his participation, he was deported to Villa Cisneros in Spanish Sahara until he was released in the general amnesty of 1934. During his stay in Villa Cisneros he neared Carlism and during the conspiracy of 1936 he served as a Carlist representative in the Army of Africa.

At the outbreak of the Civil War in 1936 Tella, a major, commanded a column of General Juan Yagüe's Army of Africa in its drive north from Seville. His outstanding success was the Battle of Mérida, on 11 August, in which his defence of the city enabled the bulk of Yagüe's army to move against Badajoz without being outflanked. He then took part in the Siege of Madrid.

Tella was promoted to brigadier general in 1938 and in 1940 made commander of the 81st Division. Tella was named military governor of Burgos and in 1942 of Lugo. A military tribunal discharged Tella from the army in 1943, supposedly for financial corruption while serving military governor in Lugo. Historian Paul Preston suggests that Tella was removed because of his strong pro-monarchist position which wanted to see Franco replaced by the pretender Juan de Borbon y Battenberg. He was kept under house arrest in Albacete and Palencia from 1944 to 1945.

Tella died in 1967.
