= Battle of Almendralejo =

Coordinates: 38°41′00″N 6°24′30″W

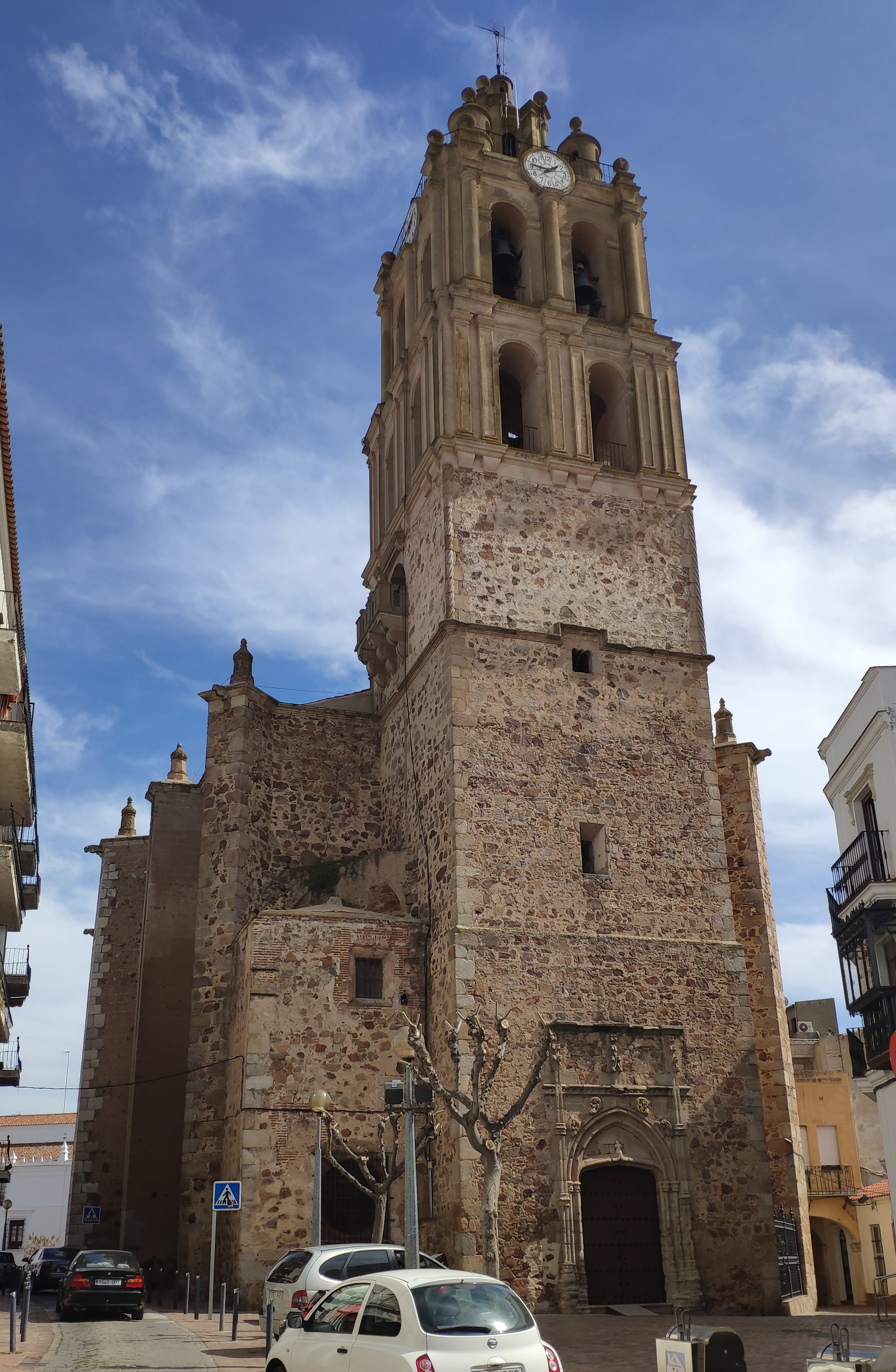
Church of the Purification, Almendralejo, Spain

The Battle of Almendralejo was a battle and massacre in Almendralejo, Spain, in August 1936, during the first stages of the Spanish Civil War.

== History ==
In course of their drive north, on 7 August 1936, the troops of General Francisco Franco, under the command of Gonzalo Queipo de Llano, entered Almendralejo and took the town. Upon the entrance of the troops, the Republican militiamen withdrew; forty of them holed up in the Tower of the Parish of the Purification (Torre de la Parroquia de la Purificación), whose profile dominates the surrounding countryside. Military staff then decided to set fire to the parish and shell the tower with a cannon installed in the Fuente La Negra, in order to force the Republicans to surrender.

Roughly 1,000 civilians were killed. The Republicans resisted until 15 August 1936.

== See also ==
- List of Spanish Republican military equipment of the Spanish Civil War
- List of Spanish Nationalist military equipment of the Spanish Civil War
