= Los Santos de Maimona =

- Municipality
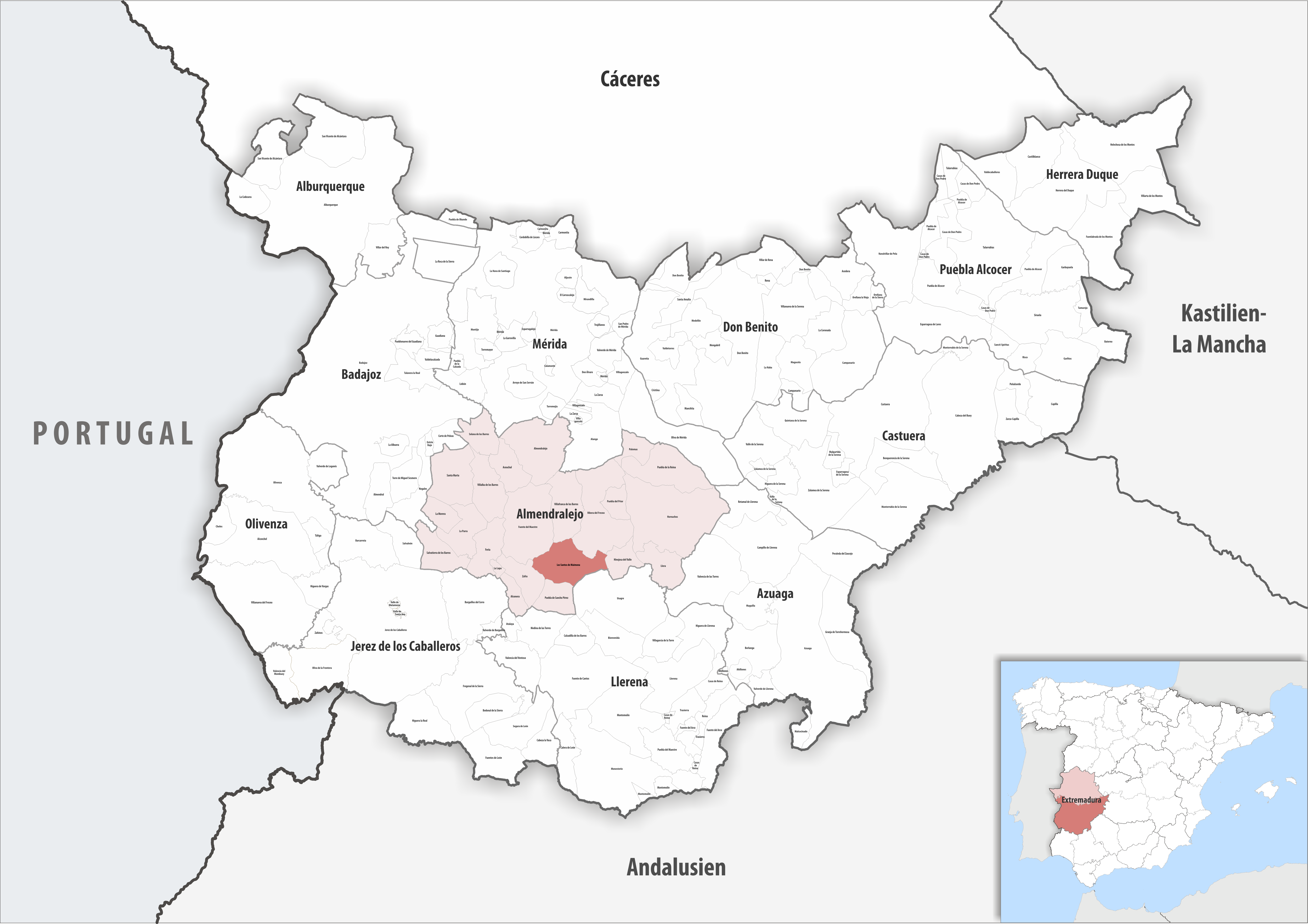

- Location in Spain Los Santos de Maimona (Extremadura)
- Coordinates: 38°26′56″N 6°23′2″W
- Country: Spain
- Autonomous Community: Extremadura
- Province: Badajoz
- Comarca: Zafra - Río Bodión

Government
  - Mayor: Manuel Lavado Barroso (PP)

Area
  - Total: 108 km^{2} (42 sq mi)
- Elevation (AMSL): 529 m (1,736 ft)

Population (2025-01-01)
  - Total: 8,088
  - Density: 74.9/km^{2} (194/sq mi)
- Time zone: UTC+1 (CET)
  - Summer (DST): UTC+2 (CEST (GMT +2))
- Postal code: 06230
- Area code: +34 (Spain) + 924 (Badajoz)
- Website: www.lossantosdemaimona.org

Los Santos de Maimona is a municipality in the province of Badajoz, Extremadura, Spain. It has an area of 108 km^{2}. In 2018, the population was 8,126.

== See also ==
- List of municipalities in Badajoz
