= Monesterio =

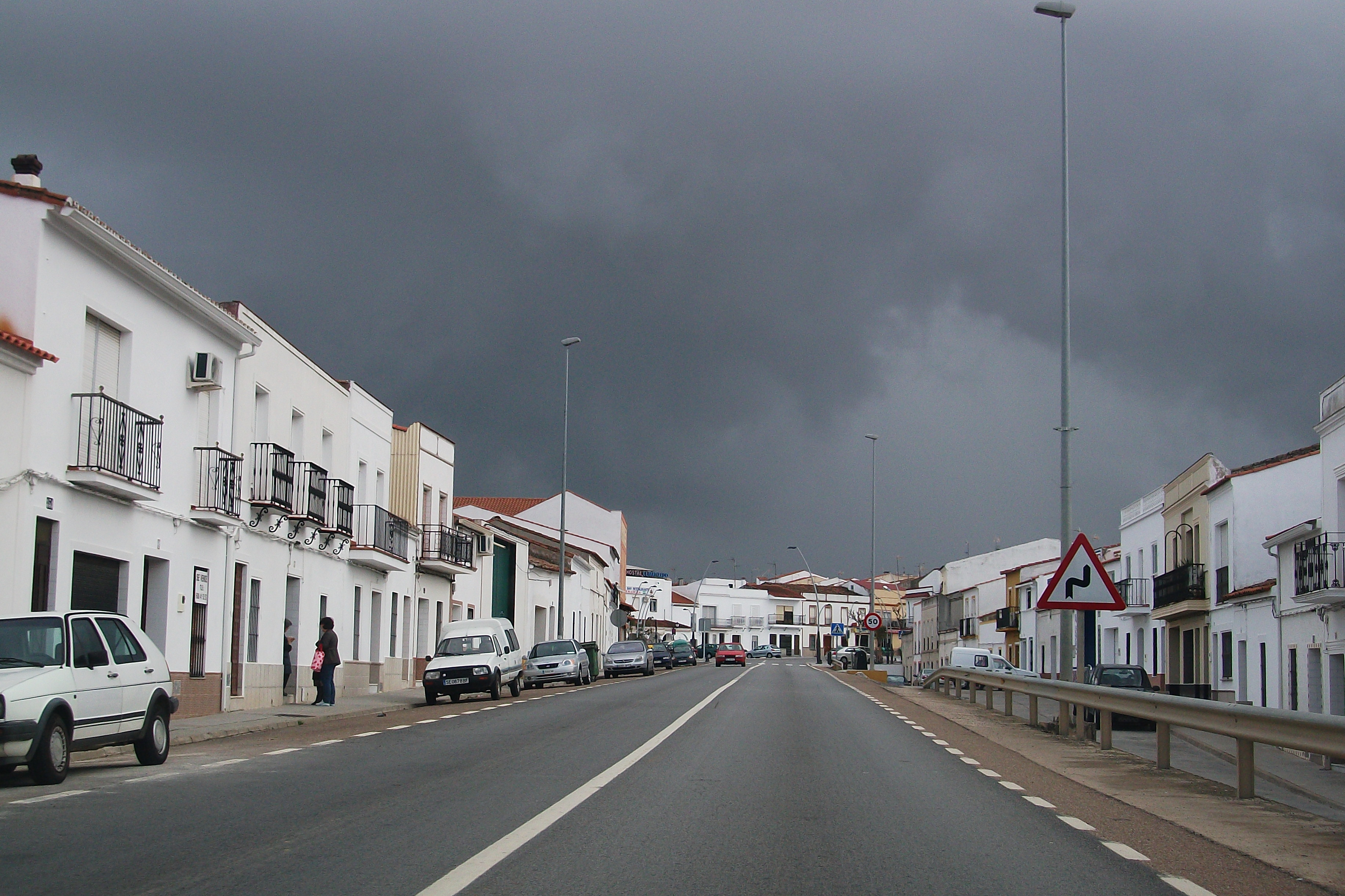
- Monesterio

- Coat of arms

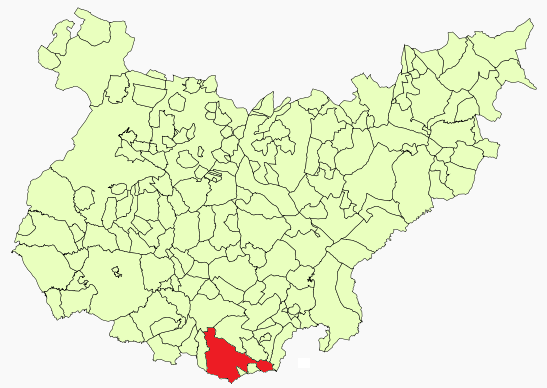
- Location in Badajoz

- Location of Monesterio within Extremadura
- Coordinates: 38°5′15″N 6°16′28″W
- Country: Spain
- Autonomous community: Extremadura
- Province: Badajoz
- Comarca: Tentudía

Government
  - Alcalde: Antonio Garrote Ledesma

Area
  - Total: 322 km^{2} (124 sq mi)
- Elevation: 765 m (2,510 ft)

Population (2025-01-01)
  - Total: 4,245
  - Density: 13.2/km^{2} (34.1/sq mi)
- Time zone: UTC+1 (CET)
  - Summer (DST): UTC+2 (CEST)
- Website: Ayuntamiento de Monesterio

Monesterio is a Spanish municipality in the province of Badajoz, Extremadura. It has a population of 4,368 (2007) and an area of 322.4 km^{2} (124.5 sq mi).

== See also ==
- List of municipalities in Badajoz
