= Antonio Castejón Espinosa =

Spanish military officer

Antonio Castejón Espinosa (1896, Manila – 1969) was a Spanish army officer from the Army of Africa who fought for the Nationalists in the Spanish Civil War. He was born in the Philippines which was a Spanish colony.

At the start of the Civil War Major Castejón's unit of the Spanish Legion joined the rebels and took control of Tetuán in Spanish Morocco. In August 1936 he commanded one of Nationalist columns which performed a raid towards e Mérida and which later took Badajoz by storm. He was present at the subsequent relief of Toledo and was wounded in the fighting around Madrid. Promoted to Colonel in 1937.

Castejón was given command of the 102nd division of the Army of Andalusia during the Battle of the Ebro. He was promoted to General at war's end. From 1939 to 1942, he commanded the Tercio «Duque de Alba» of the Spanish Foreign Legion.
