= Colonial troops =

Troops from colonial territories of a nation

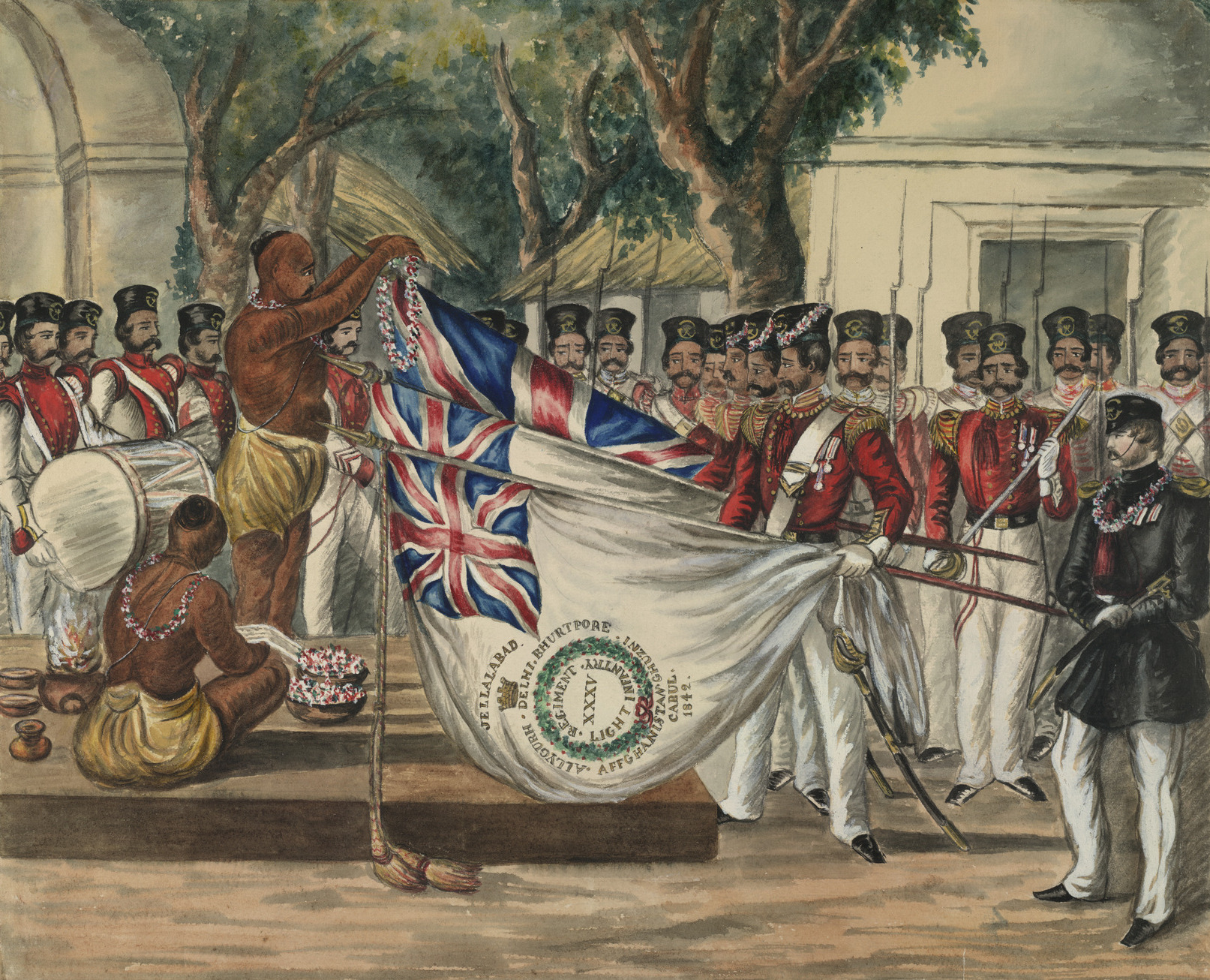
Hindu priests garlanding the colours of the 35th Bengal Light Infantry at a Presentation of Colours ceremony, c. 1847

Colonial troops or colonial army refers to various military units recruited from, or used as garrison troops in, colonial territories.

== Colonial background ==
Such colonies may lie overseas or in areas dominated by neighboring land powers such as Imperial China or Tsarist Russia. Colonial troops have been used by imperial powers whether ancient (such as Carthage and Rome), or modern (such as Great Britain, France, Netherlands, Denmark, the United States, Germany, Italy, Japan, Spain, and Portugal). Sometimes they have been recruited under local leaders, as auxiliaries; and at other times organised directly by the colonial power.

== Origins ==
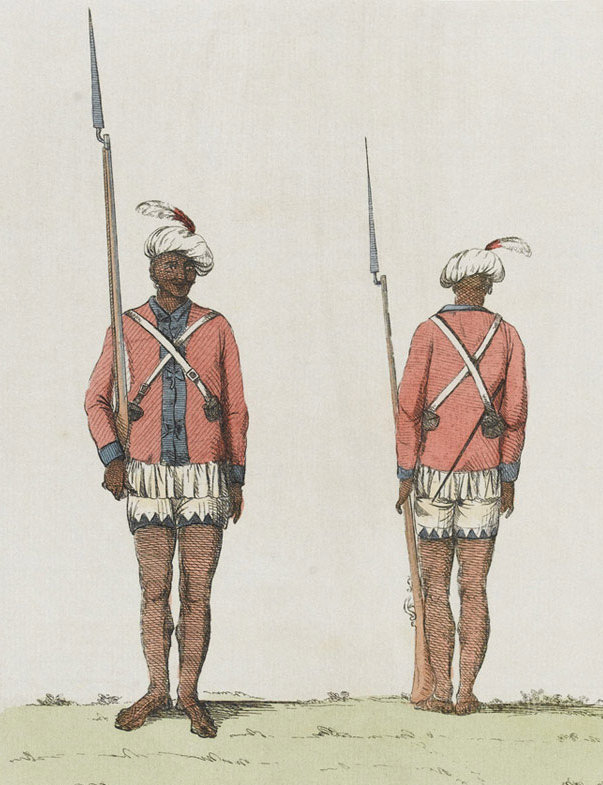
1773 illustration of Bombay Army sepoys

At the beginning of the modern colonial period such troops were predominantly Europeans from the home army of the country concerned, but locally raised "native" troops were soon recruited. The latter normally served in separate units, at first under their own leaders, later under European officers.

The sepoys of the East India Company were an early example. By the mid 18th century, these troops were beginning to be directly recruited by the Company, allowing more systematic provisioning, drill and tactics, forming the presidency armies. During the Indian Rebellion of 1857, or "Sepoy Mutiny", many of the sepoys rebelled against the Company, leading to the end of Company rule in India. After the British government took direct control of British India in 1858, the sepoys formed the regiments of the Indian Army, some of which survive to the present day in the national armies of India and Pakistan.

The French and Portuguese enclaves in the Indian subcontinent also recruited sepoys.

== Basis of recruitment ==
In the larger colonial possessions the garrison was likely to comprise both locally recruited and white troops. The latter might be from the home or metropolitan army, from settlers doing their military service or occasionally from mercenaries recruited outside the territories of the colonial power concerned. Units of european troops raised specifically for overseas service include those in France (les marsouins within numerous régiments d'infanterie coloniale), and in Spain (Spanish Legion in the 1920s, continuing the legacy of the Regimiento Fijo a century previous). The European regiments of the East India Company were placed under the command of the Crown in 1858 following the end of the Indian Rebellion of 1857.

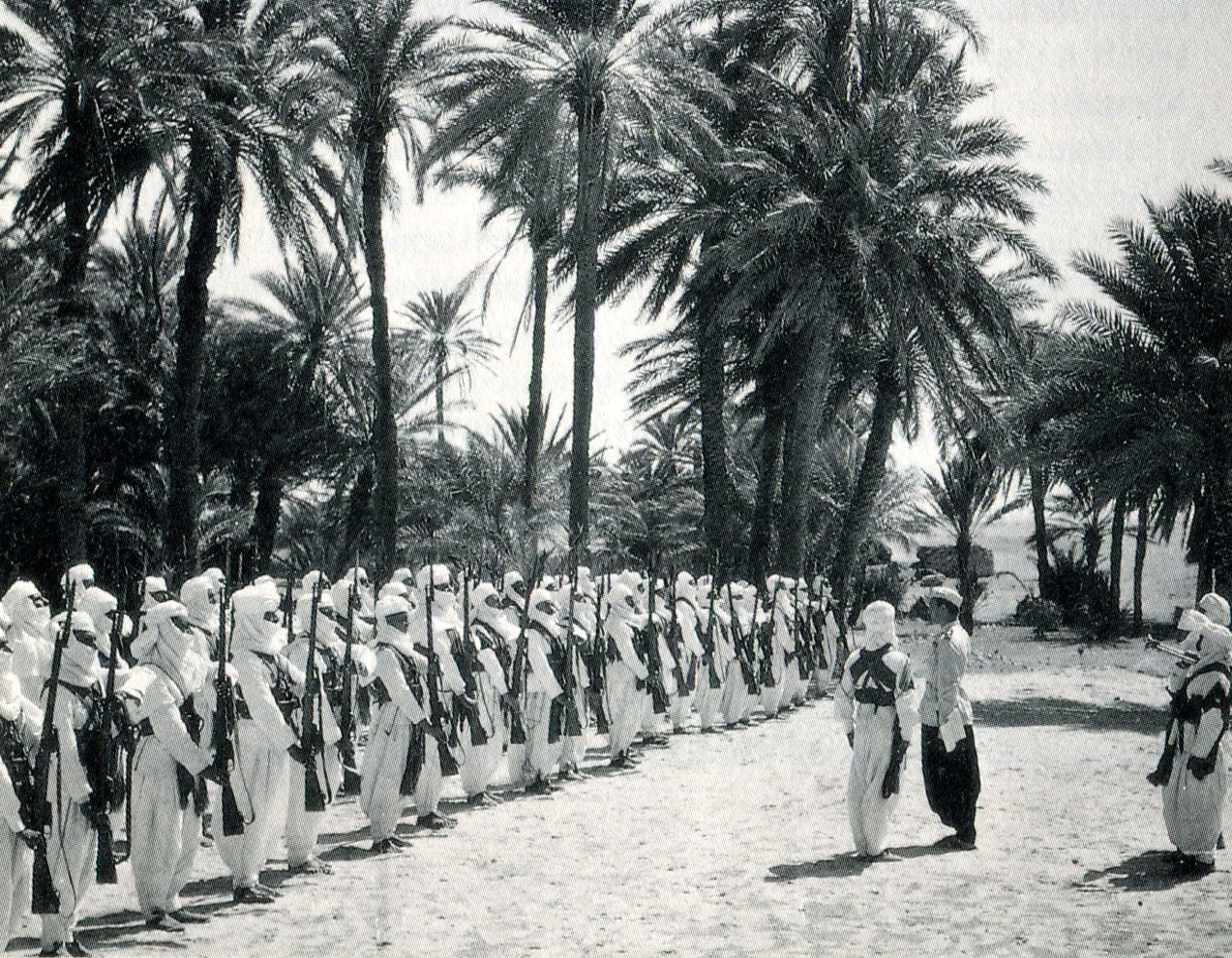
Libyan soldiers of the Royal Corps of Colonial Troops, 1936

The French Army of Africa garrisoning Algeria, Morocco, and Tunisia comprised all of these elements. The Dutch had a similar mix of locally recruited and metropolitan troops composing their garrison in the East Indies. While the Sikhs, Punjabis, Marathis, Rajputs, Jats, Baloch, and other "martial races" making up the bulk of "native regiments" of the Indian Army were recruited from British subjects, the ten regiments of Gurkha Rifles were recruited from outside British-controlled territory. In Burma, the British recruited primarily from the Hill dwelling minorities such as the Karens, Kachin, and Chin while preventing the plain dwelling majority of Bamar, Rakhine, and Mon people from joining the colonial military service; this was due to the perception that they were unsympathetic towards the colonial government.

Following the French example, it was Italian colonial practice to rotate indigenous troops of the various Royal Colonial Corps between their North and East African possessions according to local requirements. At various times during the early 20th century Eritrean units were deployed in what is now Libya and vice versa.

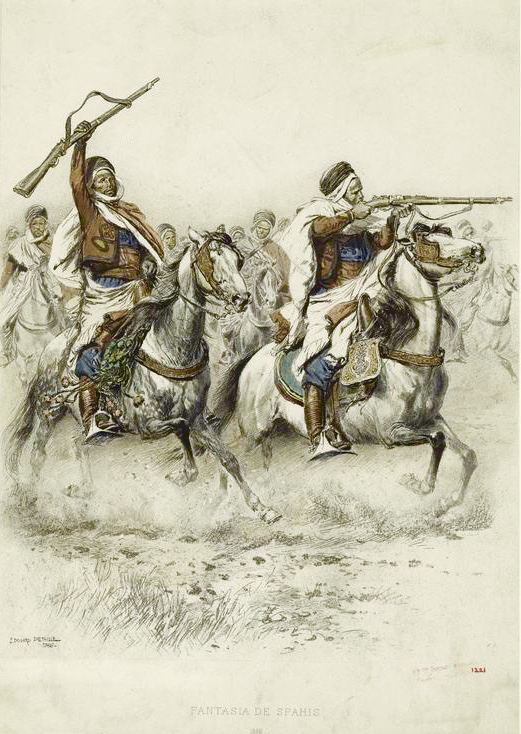
1886 illustration of Algerian spahis of the Army of Africa

Many colonial powers sought to recruit minority peoples, such as the Ambonese in the Netherlands East Indies (NEI), to counterbalance majority populations seen as potentially rebellious, such as the Javanese. Such minority groups, and those with records of loyalty in revolt, were often designated as "martial races"; their supposedly superior fighting qualities propagandized, and their communities rewarded with special status. The colonial power might face however a dilemma: when military developments made numbers a priority, it had to either trust the majority and so risk loss of control, or alternatively to rely on minorities combined with large numbers of expensive European or other non-local troops. The French Army of the Levant provided an example of the latter option. Raised to garrison Syria and Lebanon from 1920 to 1943, this force of about 10,000 men (in 1938) was predominantly recruited from Alawite, Druze, Kurdish, and Circassian minorities, augmented by North African, Senegalese, and French Foreign Legion units.

Following the integration of the HEIC's european regiments from 1858 onwards, such as the 2nd Bengal (European) Fusiliers, the British Army rotated large numbers of its regular troops through India and other overseas possessions, augmenting the local colonial forces. However it is notable that British forces in Nigeria and other West African territories were under normal circumstances nearly all locally recruited, except for officers, some non-commissioned officers, and a few specialists.

Changes in colonial ruler usually meant the continuation of local recruitment - often from the same sources. Both the Spanish and United States rulers of the Philippines employed Filipino troops from the same regions and tribal groups. In the 1830s the original zouaves were volunteers from a tribal group which provided mercenaries for both the Turkish and French rulers of Algeria.

== Settler militia ==
Colonial troops may comprise local forces drawn from settlers in colonies where these were numerous. In the 18th century, militia units were raised in colonial America. A large portion of the forces maintained by Spain and Portugal in Central America and South America until the early 19th century were locally recruited. Units of regulars (Regimiento Fijo) served alongside militia counterparts in Spanish Louisiana and other colonies. Colonial militias in Australia, Canada, and New Zealand formed the origins of the modern armies of these countries.

== Advantages ==
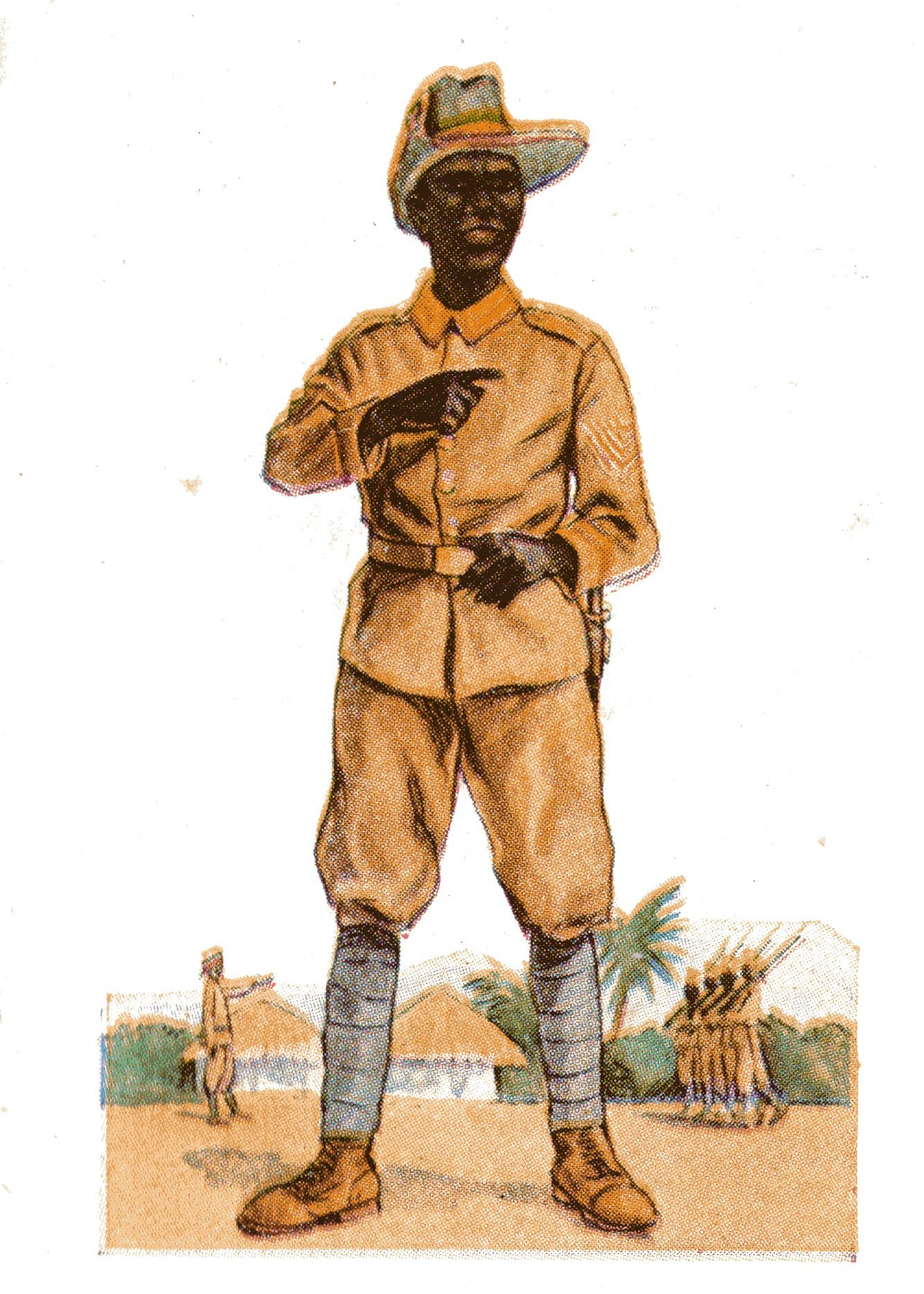
c. 1910 illustration of an African feldwebel of the Imperial German Schutztruppe

The advantages of locally-recruited troops in colonial warfare were several. They had familiarity with local terrain, language and culture. They were likely to be immune from disease in areas such as the West Indies and West Africa, which were notoriously unhealthy for European troops until the early 20th century. "Native" troops were usually recruited from tribal or other groups that had long-established martial traditions. It was not uncommon for colonial armies to favor the races that had shown the fiercest opposition to the initial conquest of a given territory (examples being the Sikhs of India and the Rif tribesmen of Morocco). Colonial units could be employed in campaigns or conditions in which the use of conscripts from metropolitan regiments would be politically unpopular.

Colonial troops could be used to garrison or subdue other territories than those in which they were recruited to avoid problems of conflicting loyalties. As noted, Italy used Eritrean askaris in Libya and during both wars with Ethiopia (1895 and 1936). Indian regiments garrisoned Aden, Singapore, and Hong Kong at various times in the 19th and the early 20th centuries. In the 1950s, the Portuguese used African troops from Mozambique to garrison Goa, and the Dutch had West Africans (Belanda Hitam) for service in the East Indies during much of the 19th century.

== Disadvantages ==
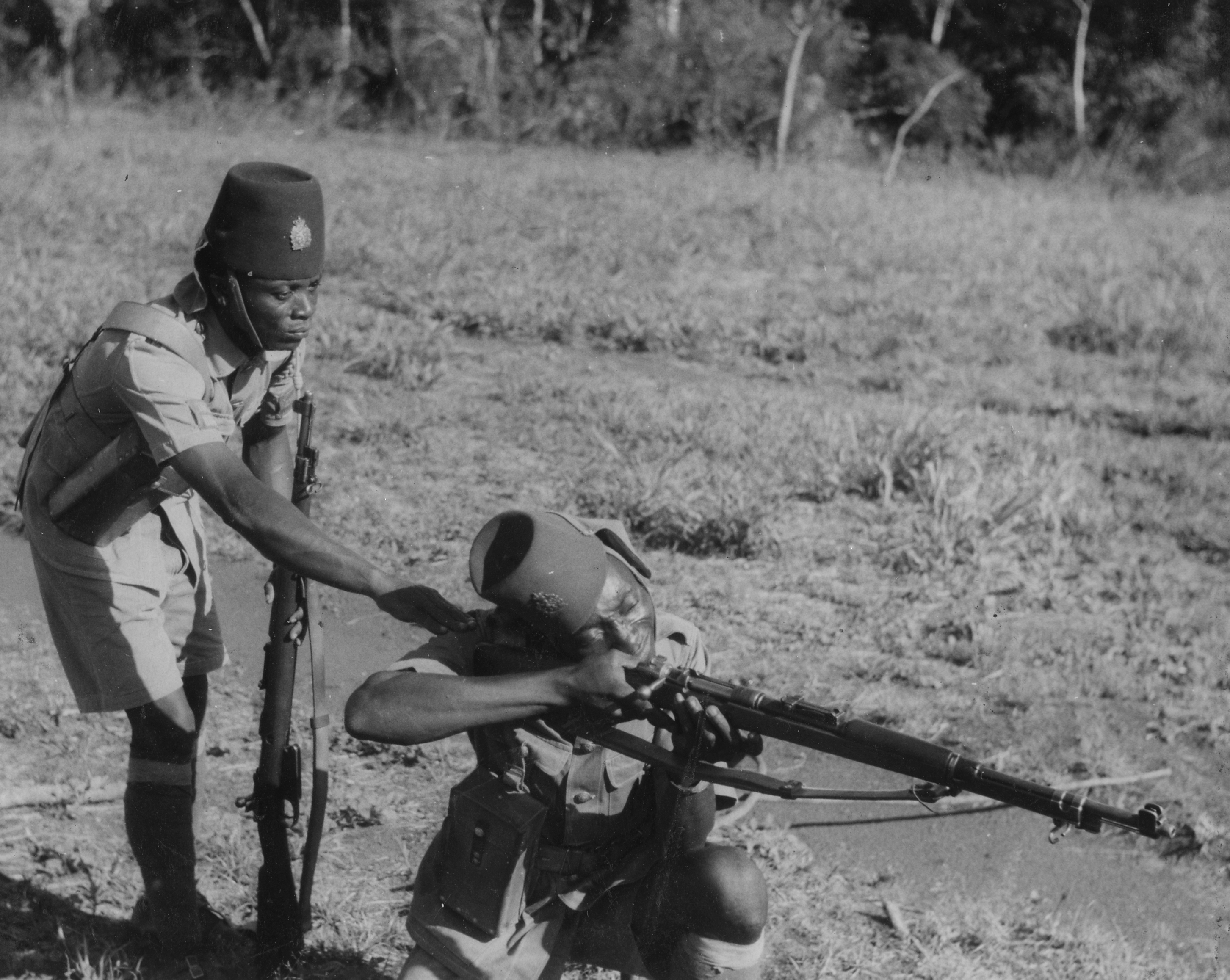
Two Force Publique soldiers from the Belgian Congo in 1943

Colonial troops were usually more lightly equipped than their metropolitan counterparts, who were usually given priority when new weaponry was issued. This apparent discrimination sometimes arose from the actual light infantry or light cavalry roles required of colonial forces, which were intended primarily for low intensity warfare against poorly-armed opponents in difficult terrain. Until World War II, artillery or mechanized units rarely had indigenous troops although the Italian colonial army maintained a number of Eritrean, Somali, and Libyan mule artillery batteries, and there were locally-recruited mountain batteries in the Indian Army. The relative lack of up-to-date weaponry and training put colonial troops at an initial disadvantage when they faced modern opponents such as the German or Japanese armies of World War II.

Even earlier, the African and Indian troops that had been sent to France in 1914 encountered a climate, diet, and general conditions of service greatly different from those with which they were familiar. The Senegalese Tirailleurs of the French Army had to be withdrawn to southern France for recuperation and training during the harsh winters of the Western Front. All Indian troops, with the exception of some cavalry regiments, were withdrawn from the Western Front in October 1915, to serve in Mesopotamia, Palestine, and East Africa.

On the other hand, the regiments of the Indian Army were an army in their own right with responsibilities in the wider Empire. They were equipped as such, apart from lacking certain specialist capabilities, and took on the Ottomans, the Germans, the Italians and later the Japanese more or less on their own but were sometimes accompanied by a substantial British presence. In the early stages of World War I (November 1914), a British-Indian expeditionary force suffered a major defeat by well-trained and well-led German askaris (Schutztruppe) at the Battle of Tanga, in East Africa, but two divisions of Indian infantry also fought with distinction in France in a type of war and a climate for which they had been little prepared.

The selective recruitment of particular ethnic groups for service in the colonial military was frequently influenced by the perception of their military abilities and loyalty towards the colonial regime. On occasion, these restrictions were overturned due to a lack of manpower, especially during and in the run-up to World War II.

== Use outside areas of origin ==
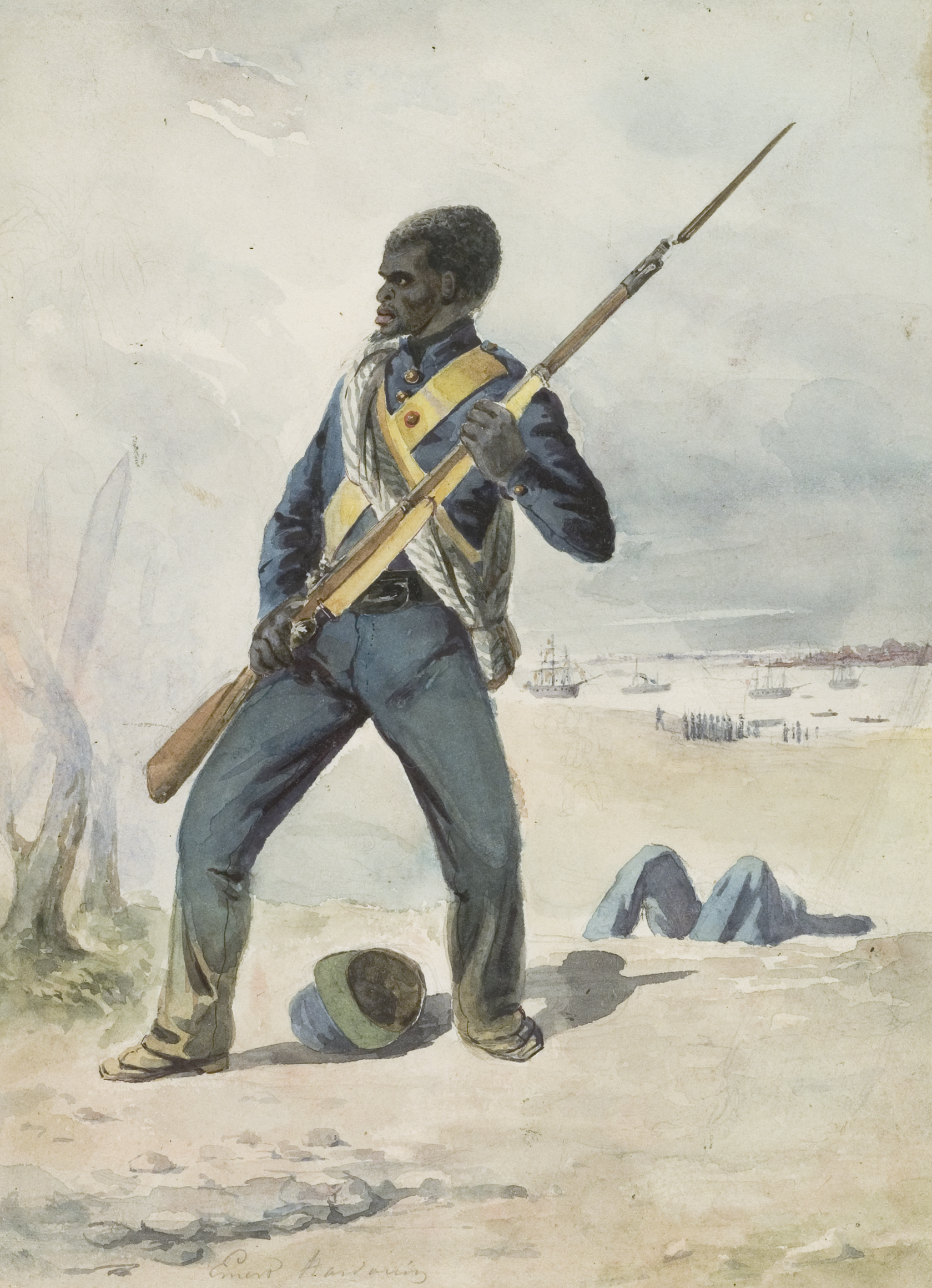
Painting of a Black soldier of the Royal Netherlands East Indies Army

By the 20th century, colonial troops were often being used outside the boundaries of their territories of origin. Troops from France's North African colonies served in the Crimean War, the Franco-Prussian War, and most notably in the trenches of World War I in France itself. France subsequently used African troops in World War II and during the Indochina and Algerian Wars. For reasons of geographical proximity France tended to integrate colonial troops from North Africa closely with their metropolitan army even in peace-time. Accordingly between 1920 and 1962 colonial units were assigned to service in Europe on a recurring basis. Between the two world wars this arrangement served, in part, to compensate for the heavy French military losses of 1914-18.

Indian troops served in Europe in large numbers during both World Wars, as well as in the Middle East, Malaya, Burma, and North Africa in World War II. The Regulares (Moorish infantry and cavalry) of Spanish Morocco played a major role in the Spanish Civil War of 1936–1939. Japan recruited levies from Korea and Taiwan during the period of colonial rule in both countries. Italy employed Dubats from Italian Somaliland, together with Eritrean and Libyan units in the conquest of Ethiopia during 1936; Eritrean troops were also used in the occupation of Libya from 1911 to 1935 and a full division of Libyan infantry participated in the Ethiopian campaign. Portugal employed Landim troops from Mozambique in Angola during World War I, also using them in the garrisons of Portuguese India and Macau until the 1950s. During the 19th century, several thousand West African soldiers were recruited under the name of "Belanda Hitam" by the Dutch colonial authorities for military service in the Dutch East Indies.

== United States ==
Prior to the passage of the Jones–Shafroth Act in 1917, granting full US citizenship to Puerto Ricans, the US Army's 65th Infantry Regiment, was made up of Puerto Rican enlistees and a mix of American and Puerto Rican officers. The unit was formed in 1899, immediately following America's annexation of the colony in the Spanish–American War. The demographic composition of the 65th stayed generally the same after 1917 (though composed of US citizens it was no longer be a "colonial" regiment), and went onto to serve with distinction in every major US conflict since.

The US Army also organized and trained multiple colonial units during the American colonization of the Philippines from 1901 until 1946 when the Philippines became independent. These troops including the Philippine Scouts (most notably), the Philippine Constabulary, and eventually the Philippine Army in general. They were usually trained by the US military and initially led by American officers. Philippine colonial soldiers were amongst the first members of the US Army to engage in direct combat against the Japanese during World War II.

== Symbolism ==
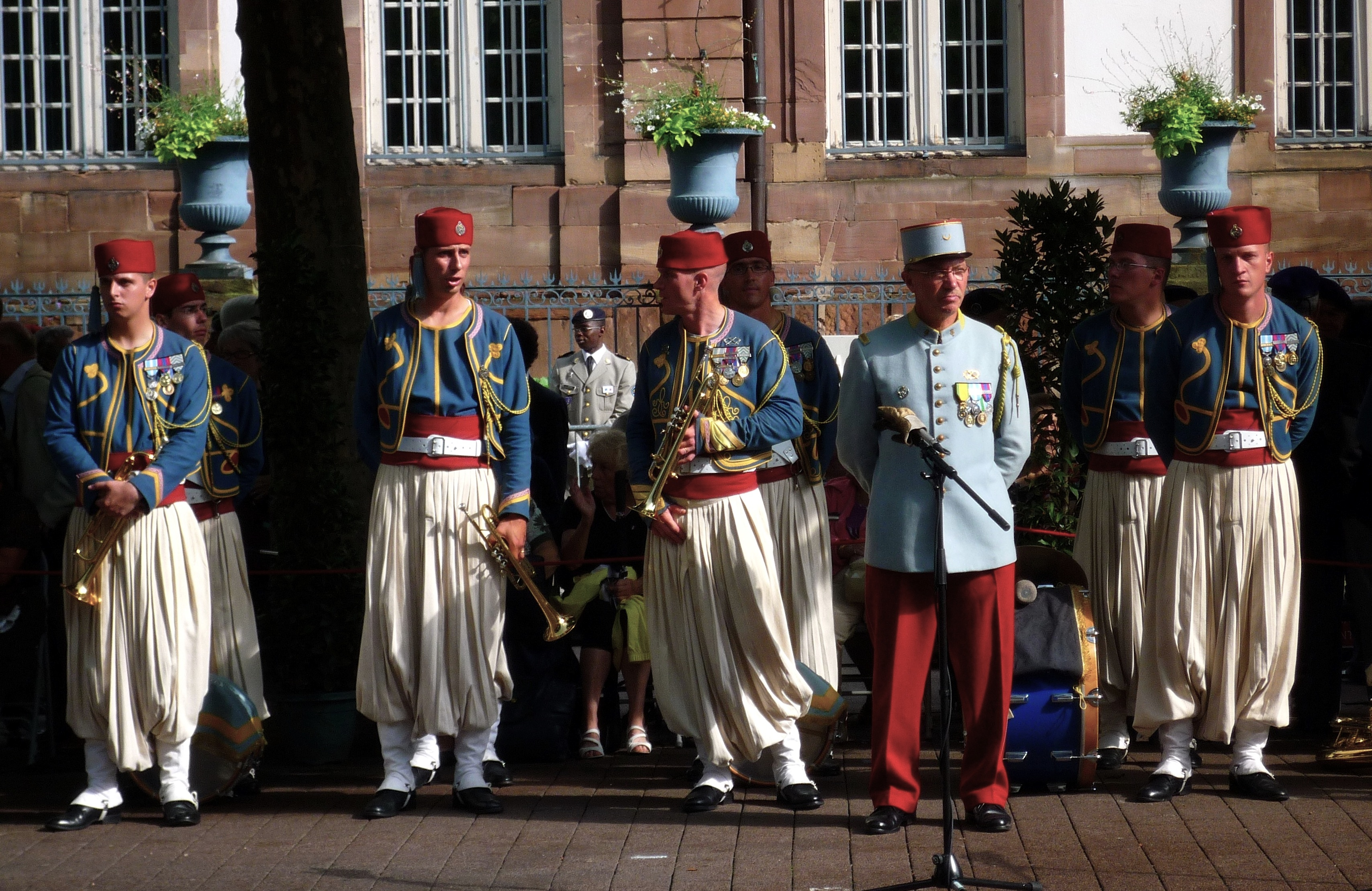
Soldiers of the French Army's 1st Regiment of Tirailleurs in 2009. The unit was formerly recruited in Algeria and still retains their historic ceremonial North African uniforms.

Colonial troops sometimes served as symbols or icons of imperial power. Representative detachments of Indian and other empire forces came to London to parade as part of coronation or other major celebrations during the late 19th and 20th centuries. French tirailleurs and spahis paraded in Paris on the 14th July each year until 1962. Until at least the 1930s, British Indian and French, Italian, and Spanish North African regiments were notable for their picturesque uniforms which incorporated native features such as colorful turbans, cloaks, and sashes. Such features were an aid to voluntary recruiting as well as ensuring a high-profile for the overseas territories represented.

== End of empires ==
The end of the colonial empires saw mixed outcomes for colonial troops. Where the transition was a relatively peaceful one the existing colonial units were likely to form the basis of the new national armies. Where there had been extended conflict those locally recruited troops who had remained loyal to their former colonial rulers might find themselves regarded as collaborators and subject to reprisals after independence. This was particularly the case in Algeria in 1962 (see Harkis) and in Guinea-Bissau during 1973/74.

== Examples ==
- Aboriginal tracker
- Askari
- Belanda Hitam
- British India
  - British Indian Army
  - Royal Indian Air Force
  - Royal Indian Navy
- Chasseurs d'Afrique
- Colonial Guard of Spanish Guinea
- Corps of Colonial Marines
- Dubat
- Force Publique
- Gurkha
- Indian auxiliaries
- Indios reyunos
- Khyber Rifles
- King's African Rifles
- Kikuyu Home Guard
- Lascar
- Lascarins
- Méhariste
- Military of Portuguese Macau
- Moroccan Goumier
- Natal Native Contingent
- Philippine Scouts
- Puerto Rico National Guard
- Regulares
- Royal Corps of Colonial Troops
- Royal Netherlands East Indies Army
- Royal West African Frontier Force
- Savari
- Senegalese Tirailleurs
- Sepoy
- Schutztruppe
- Spahi
- Special Groups (Portugal)
- Tiradores de Ifni
- Tirailleur
- Tonkinese Rifles
- Tropas Nómadas
- Troupes coloniales
- Troupes de la Marine
- United States Army Indian Scouts
- West India Regiments
- Zaptié
- Zouave

== See also ==
- Auxiliaries
- Irregular military
- Mercenary
- Militia
- Paramilitary
