= Mohamed Meziane =

Moroccan general

Field Marshal Mohammed Meziane
- محمد أمزيان
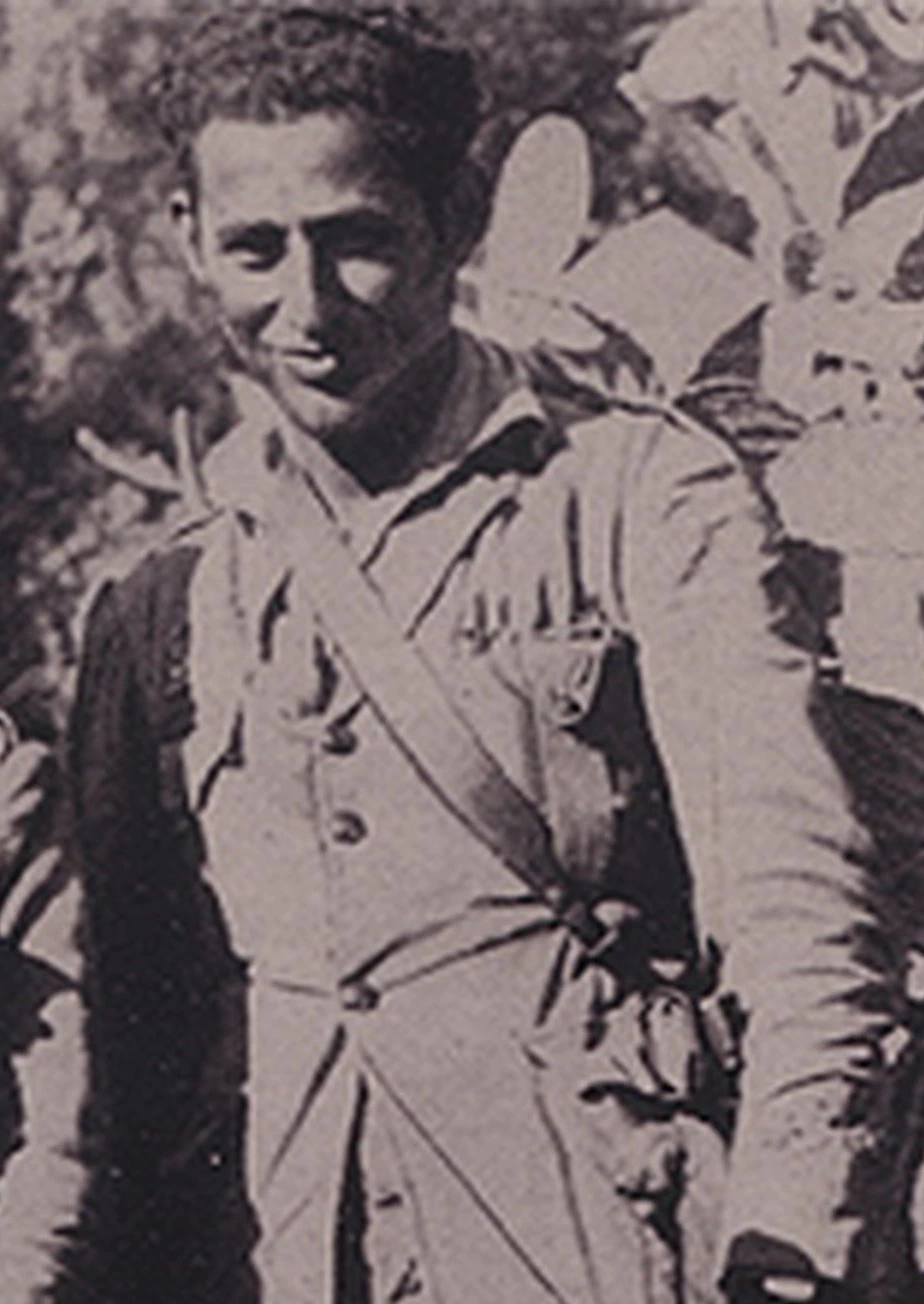

Minister of State
- In office 1970–1975

Moroccan Ambassador to Spain
- In office 1966–1970
- In office 1964–1966

Personal details
- Born: Mohamed Belkacem Zahraoui Meziane; 1 February 1897 Beni Ensar, Morocco
- Died: 1 May 1975 (aged 78) Madrid, Spain
- Children: 7, including Leïla Mezian
- Awards: Order of Military Merit; Order of Saint Ferdinand; Military Medal; Suffering for the Motherland (Morocco)
- Spouse: Fadela Amor

Military service
- Allegiance: Kingdom of Spain (1913–1931); Second Spanish Republic (1931–1936); Francoist Spain (1936–1957); Morocco (1957–1975)
- Branch/service: Spanish Army; Royal Moroccan Army
- Years of service: 1913–1975
- Rank: Lieutenant General (Spain); Field Marshal (Morocco)
- Battles/wars: Rif War; Spanish Civil War; Rif revolt Sand War

Mohammed ben Mizzian (also rendered Meziane and born Mohammed Ameziane; 1 February 1897 – 1 May 1975) was a Moroccan senior military officer and prominent military figure in Francoist Spain and Morocco.

During the Spanish Civil War he commanded a unit of the Regulares Indígenas (Indigenous Regular Forces) troops, who formed the shock troops of the Nationalist faction. Their fierceness in combat made them highly feared among Spanish Republican Army ranks. After holding many high military posts in Francoist Spain Mizzian reached the rank of Lieutenant General of the Spanish Army.

Summoned by King Mohammed V, he returned to Morocco in 1957 following the independence of the country. In 1970, he was made a Field Marshal and is the only person to have ever held that title in the Moroccan Army.

== Early life ==
Born on 1 February 1897 in Beni Ansar, son of Bel Qasem al-Zahrawi al-Mazzuji al-Qale'i, the caïd of the Mazzuja tribe, called by the Spanish Mizián "el Bueno" ("the Good One").

== Military career ==
=== Spain ===
Trained at the Military Academy in Toledo, Spain, which he joined in 1913, he was patronized by King Alfonso XIII following his father's death. After graduating as a junior officer (alférez) Mizzian served for a long period in the Army of Africa, of the Spanish Protectorate of Morocco. He took part in 1921 in the Rif Wars against Abd el-Krim. In 1923 he became a Captain and in 1925 a commander of the Spanish Colonial Army. During this time he established a deep friendship with Francisco Franco, whose life he saved on one occasion.

==== Spanish Civil War ====
At the time of the coup of July 1936 Mizzian was posted as commander of the II Tábor of Regulares 5, based at Segangan, about 20 km from Melilla. He promptly took the side of the rebel faction and in his first battle of the Spanish Civil War, he stormed the seaplane base of Atalayón in Melilla where the commanders had refused to join the rebellion. Even though the loyalist troops defending the post surrendered, the base commanders, Commander Virgilio Leret Rui and Second Lieutenants, Armando Gonzalez Corral and Luis Calvo Calavia, were executed the following morning along with all the men of the garrison, their place of burial remaining unknown.

Mizzian then moved with his Regulares to the Peninsula, where he zealously implemented General Mola's policy of instilling terror in Republican ranks. After the battle for Navalcarnero American historian John Thompson Whitaker wrote that among the Spanish Republican prisoners were two young militia women that Mizzian personally interrogated, after which he handed them over to his men. When Whitaker expressed his concern about the fate of the girls he "attended horrified in helpless anger" when Meziane stated that the two teenage women "will not live more than four hours" once at the hands of his troops.

After the Army of Africa commanded by Francisco Franco took over Toledo on 27 September 1936, Mizzian went with his troops to the military hospital and killed over 200 wounded Republican militia men in their beds, allegedly as a revenge for the Siege of the Alcazar. The proverbial cruelty and reckless behaviour of the Regulares troops were not random, but were part of a calculated plan of the Francoist military machine to allow these shock troops to spread fear among Republicans in order to demoralize them.

In Madrid Mizzian was wounded in combat during the Battle of Ciudad Universitaria. After recovery he was promoted to Lieutenant Colonel and participated in the Siege of Oviedo at the head of the Galician column. Later in the Civil War, in 1938, he was promoted to Colonel and was named Commander of the First Navarra Division (1ª División de Navarra) of the Francoist army, at the head of which he took part in the Battle of the Ebro, breaking the deadlock of the battle at the Serra de Cavalls in October 1938, taking 19 fortified enemy positions, killing 1,500 republican troops and taking 1,000 prisoners. Shortly thereafter El Mizzian moved on with his troops to spearhead the Catalonia Offensive.

Following the defeat of the Spanish Republic, Franco named Mizzian Commander General of Ceuta in the North African coast. In 1953, he was promoted to Lieutenant General and was sent to Galicia, in north-western Spain, as Captain General of the VIII Military Region. In 1955, he was named Governor General of the Canary Islands in what would be his last post in the Spanish Armed Forces.

=== Morocco ===
In 1956, Morocco became an independent nation, and King Mohammed V called on Mizzian to take charge of the reorganisation of the new Royal Moroccan Army. Mizzian formally asked for Franco to relieve him from his duties in the Spanish Army, and the request was duly granted on 22 March 1957.

In 1964, Mizzian was named Morocco's Minister of Defence, a post that he held for two years, when he returned to Spain after King Hassan II named him ambassador 'as a gesture of goodwill towards the Spanish State'. He lived quietly at the Moroccan Embassy in Madrid until 1970, when he returned to Morocco having been named Minister of State. In November that year, he was promoted to the rank of Field Marshal. He held the post of Minister of State of the Moroccan government until March 1975, when he fell gravely ill and was flown to Madrid to be treated. He died at the Air Force Hospital in Madrid in May that year, and his remains were later flown back to Morocco for burial in his home country.

== Museum ==
In 2006 a museum was opened in Rabat dedicated to Mohamed Meziane. It is located in a house near the British Embassy that had been given to him as a present by Franco. The museum project was an initiative from his daughter Leïla Mezian. The architect who was in charge of the project is a well-known architect from Casablanca, Mohamed Lamnaouar.

== See also ==
- Regulares
- White Terror (Spain)
