= Othman Benjelloun =

Moroccan businessperson (born 1932)

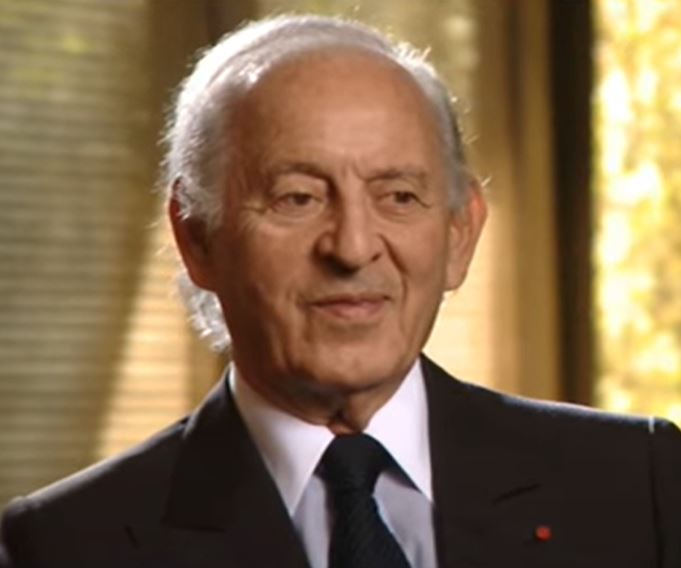
- Benjelloun in 2010
- Born: 1932 (age 93–94); Fez, Morocco
- Education: École Polytechnique Fédérale de Lausanne
- Occupations: Banker, businessman
- Known for: Owner of a bank and insurance company
- Spouse: Leïla Mezian (m. 1960; died 2024)
- Children: 2

Othman Benjelloun (Arabic: عثمان بن جلون, romanized: ʿUthmān bin Jallūn; born 1932) is a Moroccan billionaire financier. As chairman and chief executive officer of Bank of Africa (formerly BMCE Bank), he has led its expansion and internationalization across the African continent.

In July 2024, his net worth was estimated by Forbes at US$1.5 billion.

== Career ==
Benjelloun received an education at the École Polytechnique Fédérale de Lausanne in Switzerland.

Benjelloun's father was a shareholder in an insurance company that Benjelloun later took over in 1988. He turned this into RMA Watanya. After purchasing the insurance company, Benjelloun expanded the business venture into the banking industry. His banking enterprise, the BMCE Bank has its presence felt in at least 12 countries in Africa after it purchased Bank of Africa, a multinational group originating from Mali and headquartered in Luxembourg and Dakar. The banking component of Benjelloun's business career is worth $4 billion based solely on its market capitalization profits.

During the 1960s and 1970s, he made strategic alliances with global automobile manufacturers Volvo and General Motors. He is also the chairman of Meditelecom along with being associated with Telefónica and Portugal Telecom. He is a member of the Union of Arab Banks and the World Union of Arab Bankers.

== Personal life ==
He is a member of the prominent Benjelloun family from Fez, Morocco. They are Bildiyyīn, who were originally Moroccan Jews who converted into islam in the 15th Century to get rid of the burdens of the Dhimmi statute.

He was married to Leila Mezian before her death in July 2024. He has two children, Kamal Benjelloun and Dounia Benjelloun.

== Awards ==
- 2022 Best African Personality

== See also ==
- Economy of Morocco

== Bibliography ==
- "Les 50 personnalités qui font le Maroc : Othman Benjelloun. 79 ans, PDG de BMCE et de FinanceCom", Jeune Afrique, pp. 2545–2546, 18–31 October 2009, p. 40
