= Guardia Mora =

Personal ceremonial escort of Francisco Franco (1937–1956)

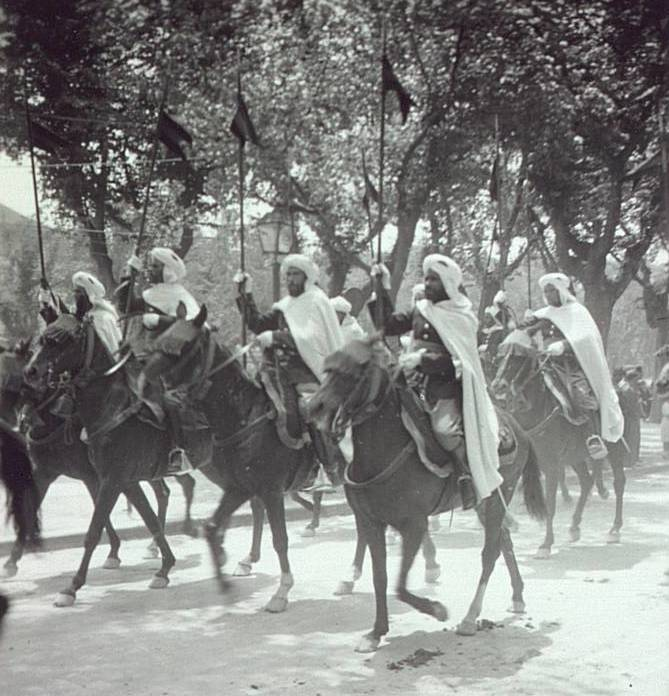
- The Guardia Mora of Francisco Franco between 1936 and 1939
- Active: 1937–1956
- Country: Spain
- Allegiance: Francisco Franco
- Branch: Household troops
- Type: Ceremonial mounted guard
- Role: Horse guards
- Garrison/HQ: Royal Palace of El Pardo, Madrid
- Engagements: Spanish Civil War

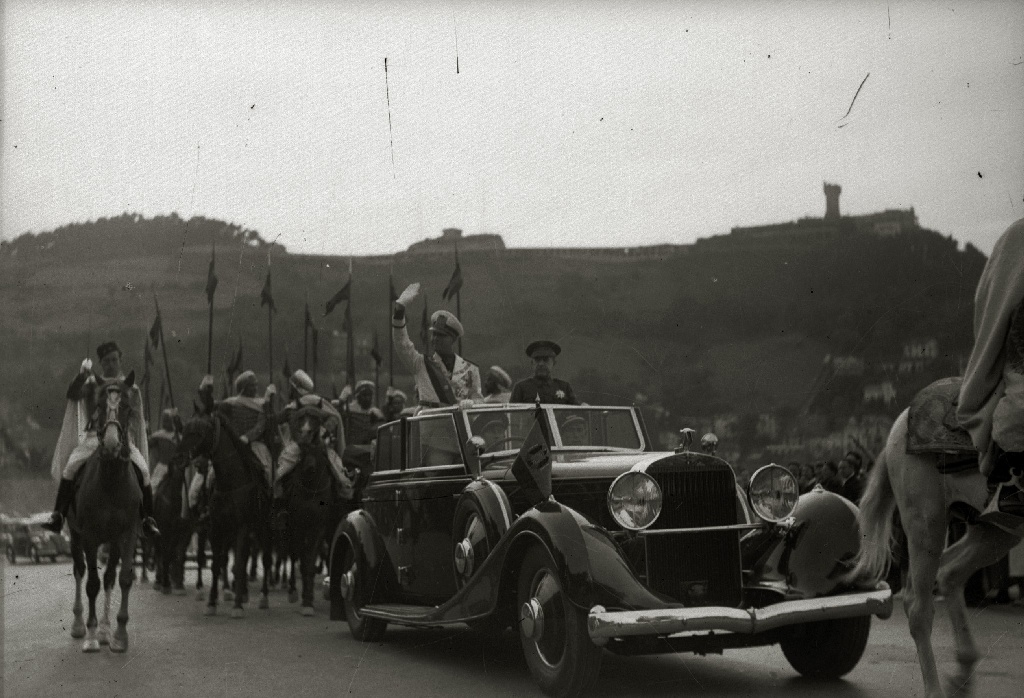
The Guardia Mora escorts Italian Count Ciano and The Count of Jordana in San Sebastián, 12 July 1939.

The Guardia Mora (English: Moorish Guard), officially the Guardia de Su Excelencia el Generalísimo (The Guards of His Excellency the Generalissimo) was Francisco Franco's personal ceremonial escort. It was formed in February 1937 from Moroccan personnel drawn from the Guardia Civil in Tétouan and the II Tabor of Grupo de Regulares de Tetuan No.1. Their white and red hooded cloak, based on the djellaba, was worn over the white parade uniform of Regulares officers.

The Guardia Mora was not controlled by the Francoist Spanish military but by the Casa Militar de Su Excelencia el Generalísimo y Jefe del Estado (Military House of His Excellency the Generalissimo and Head of State).

== History ==
The Guardia Mora has its origins in the early stages of the Spanish Civil War. In July 1936 as Military Commander of the Canary Islands, General Francisco Franco managed to fly to Spanish Morocco, where he took control of the Spanish Army of Africa, consisting mainly of Moroccan Regulares and Spanish Legion units. These professional troops were transported to Spain and began to advance towards Madrid. Already in October 1936, when he was appointed head of state during an official ceremony in Burgos, Franco attended the event accompanied by an escort formed by Moroccan horsemen from the existing Regulares cavalry regiments. Thereafter, Franco frequently appeared on public occasions flanked by a large escort of Moroccan cavalry in "Moorish" ceremonial uniforms and carrying lances.

The British historian Paul Preston has pointed out that the Guardia Mora became a symbol in itself and the best example of the new power that was being built around the figure of Franco.

After the end of the Civil War, the Moroccan units of the Army of Africa were either disbanded or returned to continue serving in Spanish Morocco. However a picked cavalry unit remained on the peninsula, serving as mounted guards, performing escort and other ceremonial functions and providing protection for the Head of State. When Franco moved his official residence to Madrid, the Guardia Mora followed him, and once established in the capital they came to have a permanent quartering in the Palace of El Pardo, official residence of the "generalissimo."

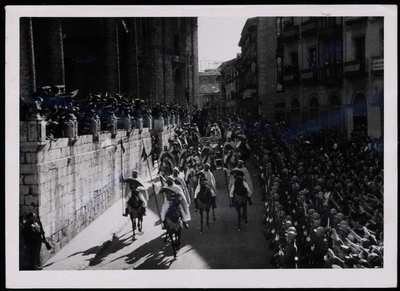
Dictator Franco, escorted by the Guardia Mora and cheered by the crowd, arrives by car to Valladolid Cathedral. September 1939

From 1939 onward the responsibilities of the Guardia Mora in Madrid were expanded to include ceremonial functions such as the provision of escorts for visiting Heads of State and for foreign ambassadors presenting their credentials.

The Guardia Mora was dissolved in 1956, after the incorporation of Spanish Morocco into the newly independent Kingdom of Morocco The mounted Guard itself continued to serve with Spanish personnel only, under the title of "Guardia de Franco". Upon Franco’s death and the ascension of King Juan Carlos I as the head of state, the guard regiment formed the basis of the "Regiment of the Royal Guard" (Regimiento de la Guardia Real); the modern day Guardia Real.

== See also ==
- Spanish Army
- Army of Africa (Spain)
- Francoist Spain
