= Colonial Guard of Spanish Guinea =

- Guardia Colonial de la Guinea Española
- Active: 1908–1968
- Country: Kingdom of Spain (1908–1931); Spanish Republic (1931–1936); Francoist Spain (1936–1968)
- Type: Gendarmerie
- Role: Maintenance of public order
- Size: 430 personnel (1908)
- Headquarters: Santa Isabel (now Malabo)
- Nickname(s): Colonial Guard; African Colonial Guard
- Engagements: Spanish Civil War: 1936 uprising in Spanish Guinea

Commanders
- Notable commanders: Lieutenant colonel Luis Serrano Maranges

The Colonial Guard of Spanish Guinea (Spanish: Guardia Colonial de la Guinea Española) or "Colonial Guard" (Spanish: Guardia Colonial) and "African Colonial Guard" (Spanish: Guardia Colonial Africana) was a body that performed military, law enforcement and customs duties in Spanish Guinea, and garrisoned the colony from the early 20th century until the independence of Equatorial Guinea in 1968.

== History ==
=== Origins ===
The Colonial Guard was founded as a result of the Budget Law of 1908, which provided for replacement of garrisons of the Marine Infantry, the Civil Guard and the Customs office by a single body that could assume all the functions of these three. The objective of the Colonial Guard was to protect Spaniards settled in the colony.

At its creation, the Colonial Guard was composed of 430 European and indigenous personnel, which meant an increase of more than 12% in the number serving in the colony over the sum of the three bodies it replaced. The establishment of this first composition was set at 1 captain, 3 first lieutenants, 7 second lieutenants, 14 sergeants, 42 corporals and 1 cornet (all of them Europeans living in the colony and from the Civil Guard), 1 senior musician, also of European origin, as well as 12 cornets, 6 1st guards, 320 2nd guards, 6 1st musicians, 12 2nd musicians and 6 music learners (all of them indigenous).

=== 1920s ===
Through the 1920s, the Kingdom of Spain mounted military campaigns to subdue the indigenous Fang people in Río Muni; by 1926, garrisons of the Colonial Guard were established throughout the enclave, and the whole colony was considered 'pacified' by 1929.

=== Role in the Spanish Civil War ===
At the outbreak of the Spanish coup of July 1936 and the commencement of the Spanish Civil War, the commander of the Colonial Guard, Lieutenant colonel Luis Serrano Maranges, revolted against the Second Spanish Republic and joined the Nationalist faction. His revolt meant that all of Spanish Guinea would end up joining the Nationalist faction in the subsequent military uprising. Nevertheless, part of the members loyal to the Republican faction, fleeing with their families by boat to Barcelona, were reintegrated into active duty with the same rank by the Republican government (according to the Government Bulletin of the Republic of 18 June 1937).

== See also ==
- Army of Africa (Spain)
- Spanish Legion
- Regulares
- Tiradores de Ifni
