= Army of Africa (Spain) =

Spanish colonial army in Morocco

- Ejército de África
- Active: 1912–1956
- Country: Spain
- Type: Army
- Role: Land force
- Size: 35,000 personnel (1909)
- Part of: Ministry of Defence of Spain (from 1937)
- Garrison/HQ: Tétouan
- Engagements: Second Melillan campaign Rif War; Asturian miners' strike of 1934; Spanish Civil War; Occupation of Tangier; Invasion of Val d'Aran

The Army of Africa (Spanish: Ejército de África, Arabic: الجيش الإسباني في أفريقيا, romanized: Al-Jaysh al-Isbānī fī Afriqā, Riffian; Aserdas n Tefriqt), also known as the Army of Spanish Morocco (Spanish: Cuerpo de Ejército Marroquí'), was a field army of the Spanish Army that garrisoned the Spanish protectorate in Morocco from 1912 until Morocco's independence in 1956.

At the start of the 20th century, the Spanish Empire's colonial possessions in Africa comprised Morocco, Spanish Sahara, Ifni, Cape Juby and Spanish Guinea.

== Spanish Morocco ==
Spanish protectorate in Morocco in 1936

Spanish Morocco was the closest Spanish colonial territory to mainland Spain and the most difficult to control. A major Moroccan revolt against both Spanish and French colonial rule began in 1921, with the destruction of a Spanish army at Annual. The Rif tribes were finally subdued only with difficulty by substantial Franco-Spanish forces after several years of fighting.

== Background and origins ==
Spain maintained garrisons in the Moroccan coastal exclaves of Melilla from the fifteenth century onwards and Ceuta (which despite having been Portuguese since 1415, chose to be the only Portuguese territory to side with the Spanish Empire after Portugal won back its independence in 1640 – due to the Iberian Union of 1580–1640). At different times these were made up of sailors, disciplinary companies, marine infantry, free companies and detachments from metropolitan units. The Spanish Army of Africa can be said to have originated as a permanent institution with the establishment in 1893 of the Regimiento de África N° 1 (1st African Infantry Regiment).

== Recruitment of Moroccan troops ==
Following the Melilla Campaign of 1909–10 Spain began expanding inland from its established coastal holdings and a force of Policia Indigena (Native Police) was created with Moroccan personnel. This indigenous force provided the basis for the establishment in 1911 of the Regulares - Moroccan infantry and cavalry units with Spanish officers.

== The Tiradores de Ifni ==
The Spanish Army of Africa included an indigenous light infantry force under European officers, designated as the Tiradores de Ifni. In existence from 1934 to 1969, this corps was modelled on the North African tirailleurs of the French Army.

== Spanish Legion ==
The Spanish Legion was formed by royal decree of King Alfonso XIII on 28 January 1920 as the Regiment of Foreigners. El Tercio was modeled on the French Foreign Legion. Its purpose was to provide a corps of professional troops to fight in Spain's colonial campaigns in North Africa in place of conscript units that were proving ineffective. The initial make-up of the regiment was that of a headquarters unit and three battalions known as Banderas ("banners") - an archaic 16th-century term.

== 1920–1936 ==
By the Rif War of the 1920s, the Army of Africa was composed in essence of the Spanish Legion and the Regulares; plus cazadores (Spanish infantry), artillery, engineers and support units. In total it numbered 30,000 soldiers and was the most professional and effective fighting force in the 100,000-man Spanish Army during the 1920s and 30s. Indigenous infantry recruited in the exclave of Ifni (Tiradores de Ifni) from 1934 on, were also considered part of the Army of Africa. A locally recruited gendarmerie, the Mehalas de la Mehalla' Jalifiana, numbering about 5,000 men and modeled on the Moroccan Goumiers attached to the French Army of Africa, was established in 1923 and provided support to the regular units of the Army of Africa.

Following the conclusion of the Rif War, the garrison of Spanish Morocco was reduced to the units listed above; plus seven infantry battalions, six cavalry squadrons and six artillery batteries from mainland Spain assigned to African service on a rotation basis.

The Spanish Legion and Moroccan colonial forces took part in the suppression of the Asturias miners' strike of 1934. The government decided to deploy them instead of the inexperienced peninsular troops, fearing the negative impact of conscript casualties on public opinion.

== Role in the Spanish Civil War ==
The Army of Africa was to play a key part during the Spanish Civil War of 1936–1939. Along with other units in the Spanish Army, the Army of Africa rose against the Second Spanish Republic and took part in the Spanish coup of July 1936 on the side of the Nacionales. On 18 July 1936, General Francisco Franco assumed the supreme command over this force.

Spanish Morocco fell to the rebels without significant opposition. The initial intention was to transport the Army of Africa to mainland Spain by sea. However the crews of the majority of ships in the Spanish Navy had remained loyal to the Republican government, overwhelming the officers who had joined the rising. Between 29 July and 5 August 1936 1,500 members of the Army of Africa were accordingly transported to mainland Spain in a bold airlift led by Junkers Ju 52 transport planes supplied by Nazi Germany. The fascist régime of the Kingdom of Italy provided Savoia-Marchetti SM.81 bombers to provide air cover for merchant ships carrying 3,000 soldiers and equipment from Morocco on 5 August. Thereafter daily flights continued until about 8,000 Moroccans and legionaries, with supporting artillery, were gathered at Seville.

After landing in Spain, the Army of Africa was split into two columns, one commanded by General Juan Yagüe and the other commanded by Colonel José Enrique Varela. Yagüe's force advanced north, making remarkably rapid gains, and then turned north-eastwards towards Madrid and Toledo. Varela's force entered Andalusia and took control of the key cities of Seville, Granada, and Córdoba. Thanks mostly to the Army of Africa's advances, almost all of western Spain was in Francoist Nationalist hands by the end of September 1936. By early 1937 the Army of Africa's strength had been increased to 60,000 men. The Legion and Regulares spearheaded Nationalist operations for the remainder of the war and played a central role in the Francoist victory.

== 1940–1956 ==
After the end of the Spanish Civil War, the demobilization and reorganization of the Francoist Army began. The Spanish Army was to be composed of twenty-four infantry divisions and one cavalry division, divided into ten Army Corps. Two were deployed in the Spanish territories of North Africa (northern part of the Protectorate of Morocco, Ceuta, Melilla and minor towns):

- The IX Army Corps in its western sector, with the 91st (Ceuta-Tetouan), 92nd (Larache-Alcazarquivir) and 93rd (Xauen) Divisions.
- The X Army Corps in the eastern sector, with the 101st (Melilla) and 102nd (Villa-Sanjurjo) Divisions.

Northern section of the Moroccan territories under protectorate of Spain until 1956.

With the ending of the Civil War the Army of Africa was reduced to a peacetime establishment. However under Franco it was accorded a higher profile in Spain itself than had been the case under either monarchy or republic. During the 1940s detachments from the Tiradores de Ifni garrisoned the Canary Islands, while a mounted Guardia Mora ("Moorish Guard") undertook ceremonial duties in Madrid.

The Moroccan troops returned to the Protectorate to resume their former duties as garrison and colonial troops: after two years of war they had already fulfilled the task entrusted to them and Franco sent them to the other side of the Strait. They would remain there during the years of the Second World War, when they could be useful in the event of Spain entering the war.

The Legion and troops of Regulares were sent to the Val d'Aran in October 1944 to repel the invasion of the area by Spanish maquis from France.

With the independence of Morocco in 1956, most of the locally recruited Regulars were transferred to the new Royal Army. The cities of Ceuta and Melilla and the smaller towns of Spanish sovereignty were maintained, and are still garrisoned by units of the Legion and Regulars. In the plans for the Withdrawal of the Spanish Army (10 April 1956 - 31 August 1961), as a consequence of the independence of Morocco, the number of Regular Infantry Forces Groups was reduced from eight to four and the two Cavalry Groups were dissolved. The Regulars had 127 Moroccan officers and 12,445 soldiers of the same nationality.

== Post Moroccan independence ==
Following Moroccan independence in 1956 the bulk of the locally recruited Regulares were transferred to the new Royal Moroccan Army. The cities of Melilla and Ceuta, and the lesser plazas de soberanía as well, remained Spanish and are still garrisoned by Legion and Regulares units.

Ifni remained under Spanish administration until June 1969. However widespread disturbances in the territory in 1956 and the Ifni War of 1957-58 led to substantial desertions amongst the indigenous rank and file of the Tiradores de Ifni. Accordingly, the four tabors which made up this force underwent a process of "europeanisation" in which the majority of their personnel were recruited from Spain itself.

== See also ==
- Spanish Legion
- Regulares
- Tiradores de Ifni
- Colonial Guard of Spanish Guinea
- Civil Guard (Spain)
- Mohamed Meziane

== External sources ==
- Beevor, Antony. The Spanish Civil War. New York: Penguin Books, 2001.
