= Leïla Mezian Benjelloun =

Moroccan physician and businesswoman (died 2024)

- ليلى مزيان بنجلون
- Born: Leïla Mezian; 1938; Valencia, Spain
- Died: 13 July 2024 (aged 85-86)
- Education: University of Madrid; University of Barcelona
- Occupations: Physician, businesswoman
- Spouse: Othman Benjelloun (m. 1960)
- Children: 2
- Father: Mohamed Meziane

Leïla Mezian Benjelloun (1938 – 13 July 2024) was a Moroccan physician and businesswoman. She was best known as the wife of billionaire Othman Benjelloun.

== Early life ==
Mezian was the daughter of Moroccan marshal Mohamed Meziane. She was born in Valencia and grew up in Spain. She was a graduate of the University of Madrid's medical school and earned a degree in Ophthalmology from the University of Barcelona's medical school.

== Career ==
Benjelloun was president of the BMCE Bank Foundation for Education and Environment.

In October 2017, she laid the foundation stone of a museum being built at the junction of Moulay Youssef Boulevard and Roudani Boulevard in Casablanca. The building is 26 meters high and was budgeted to cost 79 million MAD. The building was completed in 2018.

She was president of the Alaouite Organization for the Protection of the Blind and the Moroccan Red Crescent, vice president of the Association of Medical Doctors in Morocco, and president of the Benjelloun-Mezian Foundation.

On 2 November 2022, Leila won the Mediterranean Awards awarded by the Foundation for the Three Cultures of the Mediterranean.

== Personal life and death ==
In 1960, she married Othman Benjelloun. Together they had two children; Dounia, a film producer, and Kamal, an anthropologist and environmentalist.

Benjelloun died on 13 July 2024.
