= Tiradores de Ifni =

- The Tiradores de Ifni badge from 1941
- Active: 1934–1969
- Country: Spanish Republic (1934–1936); Francoist Spain (1936–1969)
- Branch: Army
- Type: Light Infantry
- Role: Vanguard troops
- Size: 1,235 men (prior to the Spanish Civil War)
- Garrison/HQ: Sidi Ifni, Ifni, Morocco,
- March: Marcha Himno de Tiradores de Ifni
- Engagements: Spanish Civil War; Ifni War

Commanders
- Notable commanders: Colonel Osvaldo Capaz, Founder Castor Alvarez Casado, soldier in 1961

The Tiradores de Ifni ("Ifni Rifles" or "Ifni Shooters") were volunteer indigenous infantry units of the Spanish Army, largely recruited in the enclave of Ifni. The tiradores were originally recruited from the Spanish Morocco, forming part of the Army of Africa and mostly officered by Spaniards. These troops played a role in the Spanish Civil War (1936–1939).

== History ==
In existence from 1934 to 1969, this corps was modeled on the North African tirailleurs of the French Army of Africa.

=== Creation ===
The Government of the Spanish Second Republic, by Decree of 9-VI-1934, ordered the creation of a territorial garrison to be headquartered in Sidi-Ifni, and that this force would be named the Tiradores de Ifni. Prior to the Spanish Civil War the Tiradores de Ifni consisted of 1,235 men; which included 31 officers (including 10 Moroccans), 38 non-commissioned officers and 1,166 troops, comprising three tabors.

=== Spanish Civil War ===
During the war six tabors of Tiradores were sent to serve in Spain. A separate Bandera de Ifni-Sahara was also listed. The Tiradores participated in Franco's Desfile de la Victoria (Victory Parade), held in Madrid in 1939.

=== Final years ===
Following the Civil War, the Tiradores de Ifni continued to provide the bulk of the Spanish forces garrisoning the territory. However stresses and divided loyalties caused by the Ifni War of 1957-58, led to desertions amongst the indigenous rank and file of the four tabors still comprising the Tiradores. Accordingly, Spanish recruits were brought in to maintain these units at full strength. The Tiradores de Ifni were finally dissolved following the retrocession of Ifni to Morocco in 1969.

== Uniforms ==
The Tiradores were generally uniformed similarly to the Regulares, with the addition of a siroquera. A red tarbuch was worn, sometimes it was blue. By the native officers and men, with a sand colored shirt and breeches, with brown leather equipment. Spanish officers wore a sand colored variant of the standard Spanish Army uniform with a red topped peaked cap.

== Badges ==
The original badge worn was an open yellow five pointed "saharian" star on a red diamond cloth patch. After 1937 the star was placed over a points-up white crescent and the color was changed to blue. The star and crescent were superimposed over crossed rifles and "Ifni" was emblazoned on the crescent in 1941.

== See also ==
- Spanish Army
- Army of Africa (Spain)
- Tirailleur - the French equivalent of the Tiradores
- Regulares - indigenous infantry recruited in Spanish Morocco
- Goumier - Moroccan irregulars in the French service
- Spanish Legion - equivalent of the French Foreign Legion, although recruited mainly from Spanish citizens.
