= Regulares =

Spanish Army unit

Indigenous Regular Forces
- Fuerzas Regulares Indígenas
- Regulares Badge
- Active: 1911–present
- Country: Spain
- Allegiance: Felipe VI, Spain
- Branch: Army
- Type: Infantry
- Role: Vanguard troops
- Garrison/HQ: Ceuta, Melilla, Peñón de Vélez de la Gomera, Alhucemas and Islas Chafarinas.
- Motto: Fiel Regular hasta morir (Faithful Regular till death)
- Anniversaries: 12 October

Commanders
- Notable commanders: Dámaso Berenguer, José Millán-Astray, José Enrique Varela

The Fuerzas Regulares Indígenas ("Indigenous Regular Forces"), known simply as the Regulares (Regulars), are infantry units of the Spanish Army, largely recruited in the cities of Ceuta and Melilla. Historically, the force, which has also included mounted divisions, has consisted of Berbers officered by Spaniards. The troops served as the indigenous component of the Army of Africa and played a significant role in the Spanish Civil War (1936-1939). It is the most decorated unit in the history of the Spanish armed forces.

== History ==
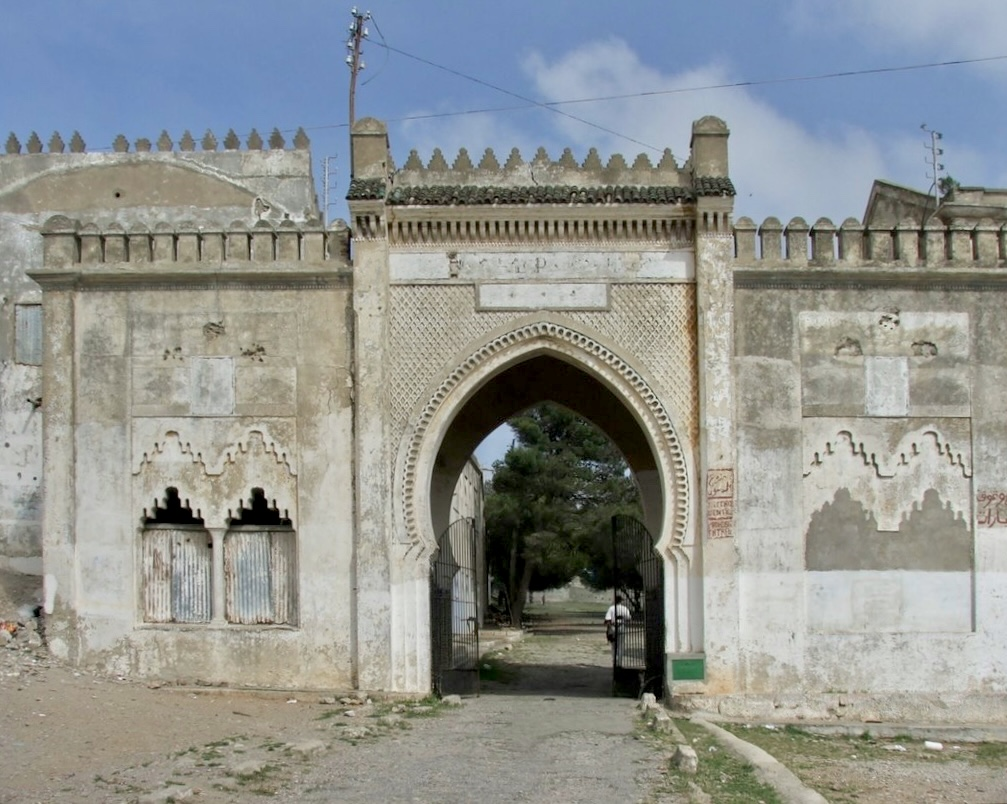
Entrance to the old Regulares barracks in Tetuán.

=== Establishment ===
The Regulares were first raised in 1911 as a "batallón indígena" of infantry of four companies plus one cavalry squadron that was expanded the following year to 2 Infantry Tabores plus 1 Cavalry Tabor. Their formation came at a time when the Spanish army was expanding into the Moroccan hinterland from the long-held coastal enclaves of Ceuta and Melilla. Previously use had been made of Moroccan auxiliaries as scouts and the designation of "regulars" appears to have been intended to distinguish the newly raised force as a permanent unit of the Spanish army. Officers and some NCOs were seconded from Peninsular regiments.

=== Early years ===
By 1914 four Groups (Grupos, the equivalent of a regiment) had been raised for active service. While the Regulares remained predominantly infantry, recognition of Moroccan skills as horsemen led to the establishment of cavalry squadrons. This mounted element of the Regulares was to remain a conspicuous feature throughout the period of Spanish rule of the protectorate. As such, each Group was composed of a headquarters and service company, two infantry Tabors (battalions) and a cavalry Tabor (squadron) plus a military band and Corps of Drums attached to the regimental headquarters. From 1914 to 1922 the Regulares were expanded in numbers to five "Grupos" based respectively in Melilla, Tetuán, Ceuta, Alhucemas and Larache (the Alhucemas Group was raised in 1921).

=== Tactics ===
The Regulares infantry were known for their ability to traverse "dead ground" without being detected, but their Spanish officers disliked unconventional warfare and only infrequently took advantage of this skill.

=== Rif Wars ===
The Moroccan troops generally remained loyal during the Rif War of the early 1920s, although there were reports of mutiny at Yat el Bax following the major Spanish defeat at the Battle of Annual in 1921. During this period the Regulares and the Spanish Legion ("Tercio") emerged as the elite corps of the Spanish Army - long-serving professionals on more or less continuous active service, attracting the best officers. These included the future caudillo Francisco Franco who served initially with the Regulares (from 1913) before transferring to the newly raised Tercio (whose troops were mostly Spaniards) as second in command and commander of its 1st Battalion in 1920.

In 1923 a detachment of the Fuerzas Regulares de Ceuta mounted guard at the Royal Palace in Madrid, indicating the high-profile achieved by the Moroccan troops. In 1934 cavalry and infantry of the Regulares were brought to Peninsular Spain by the Republican Government to assist in the suppression of the rising by Asturian miners that year.

=== Spanish Civil War ===
In 1936 the Spanish "Army of Africa" (totaling 30,000 in the Legion and Moroccan Regulares regiments) formed part of the rebellion led by General Franco against the Republican Government in Madrid. In the crucial initial phase of the Spanish Civil War, the rebels were able to airlift a significant number of Moroccan troops plus legionnaires across the Straits of Gibraltar, with German and Italian assistance, in order to become the shock troops of the Nationalist battles. The professionalism and brutality of the Army of Africa played a major part in early Nationalist successes. As the war continued five more grupos of Regulares infantry were raised plus two of cavalry (the 1st Cavalry Group based in Tetuan and the 2nd Cavalry Group in Melilla).

The Regulares with their experience of North African warfare proved to be excellent combatants in the open countryside while advancing from Seville to Madrid during August - November 1936. However they subsequently proved less adept at street fighting in unfamiliar urban environments. With the raising of substantial Nationalist forces in mainland Spain the role of the Regulares diminished but they retained a key function as shock troops until the end of the Civil War. Conspicuous in Franco's victory parade in Madrid in 1939, the Regulares were the most decorated units of the Nationalist forces. The numbers of the Army of Africa doubled in the course of the war to about 60,000.

=== In Francoist Spain ===
Following the Nationalist victory the Regulares were reduced in number but retained their structure. Franco authorized the establishment of a ceremonial mounted honour guard ("Guardia de Su Excelencia el Generalísimo") from the Regulares cavalry which, with colourful Moorish uniforms and white Arabian horses, served in close attendance on him and formed part of his guards unit.

With the independence of Morocco in 1956 the majority of the Moroccan personnel of the Regulares, numbering about 12,500, were transferred to the newly raised Royal Moroccan Armed Forces. The two cavalry units were disbanded and the Groups were reduced to just eight. In 1957 Franco's ceremonial guard in Madrid, the Guarda Mora (Moorish Guards), were replaced by an escort of Spanish cavalry who retained the white cloaks and horses of the Regulares.

=== Present day ===
Coat of arms of the 52nd Regulares Light Infantry Group "Melilla"

Coat of arms of the 54th Regulares Light Infantry Group "Ceuta"

Spain retained the historic enclaves of Melilla and Ceuta and the reduced Groups of Tetuan, Melilla, Ceuta and Alhucemas remained in existence as part of the two garrisons.

As part of a wider reorganisation of the Spanish Army in 1986, the existing 4 Regulares Groups were amalgamated into two light infantry regiments within the present day Spanish Army, which exist to this very day. Their active personnel are Spanish citizens first and foremost, many of them natives of the cities of Ceuta and Melilla, both Muslim and Christian. They retain the traditional divisions of Grupos or Groups (regiments) and Tabores (battalions) as follows:

- Grupo de Infantería Ligera Regulares de Melilla nº 52 (Stationed in Melilla, Peñón de Vélez de la Gomera, Peñón de Alhucemas and Islas Chafarinas )
  - Tabor Alhucemas I
  - Tabor Rif II
- Grupo de Infantería Ligera Regulares de Ceuta nº 54 (Stationed in Ceuta )
  - Tabor Tetuan II (motorized)
  - Anti-tank company

Both the present regiments are also successors to regular infantry regiments of the Spanish Army, which formerly served in Melilla and Ceuta.

In recent years detachments of Regulares have served in peace missions both in Bosnia and Afghanistan.

== Evolution ==
In 1914 the Regulares were expanded with the creation of four regiments, titled Groups (Grupos), specifically "Grupos de Fuerzas Regulares Indígenas (Groups/Regiments of Indigenous Regular Forces). Each of these four groups consisted of the regimental headquarters company, two Infantry Tabors (battalions) of three companies plus a Tabor of three cavalry troops/squadrons, together with support elements.

Specifically, the Groups of Indigenous Regular Forces were constituted as follows:

- 1st Group of Indigenous Regular Forces "Tetuán", (Tetuan)
- 2nd Group of Indigenous Regular Forces "Melilla" ( Melilla and Nador )
- 3rd Group of Indigenous Regular Forces "Ceuta" ( Ceuta )
- 4th Group of Indigenous Regular Forces "Larache" ( Arcila and Larache )

In 1921 and after the Battle of Annual a fifth unit was created:

- 5th Group of Indigenous Regular Forces "Alhucemas", with HQ in Segangan

After the Spanish Civil War, five new groups were raised:

- 6th Group of Indigenous Regular Forces "Xauen", based in the city of Xaue.
- 7th Group of Indigenous Regular Forces "Llano Amarillo", with headquarters in Cabrerizas, Mellilia.
- 8th Group of Indigenous Regular Forces "Rif", based in the Souk el Had, Beni Sicar
- 9th Group of Indigenous Regular Forces "Arcila", based in the city of Alcazarquivir.
- 10th Group of Indigenous Regular Forces "Bab-Taza", with barracks in Bab-Taza.

Two groups of cavalry were also raised, organized into a regimental HQ and three Tabors of cavalry squadrons/troops each:

- 1st Group of Indigenous Cavalry Regular Forces Tetuán
- 2nd Group of Independent Indigenous Cavalry Forces Melilla

== Uniforms ==
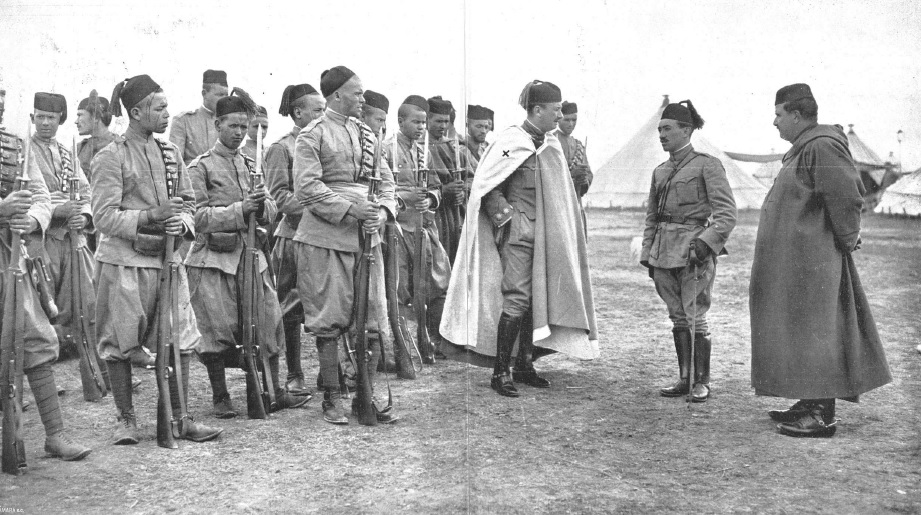
Colonel Dámaso Berenguer with Regulares in 1913.

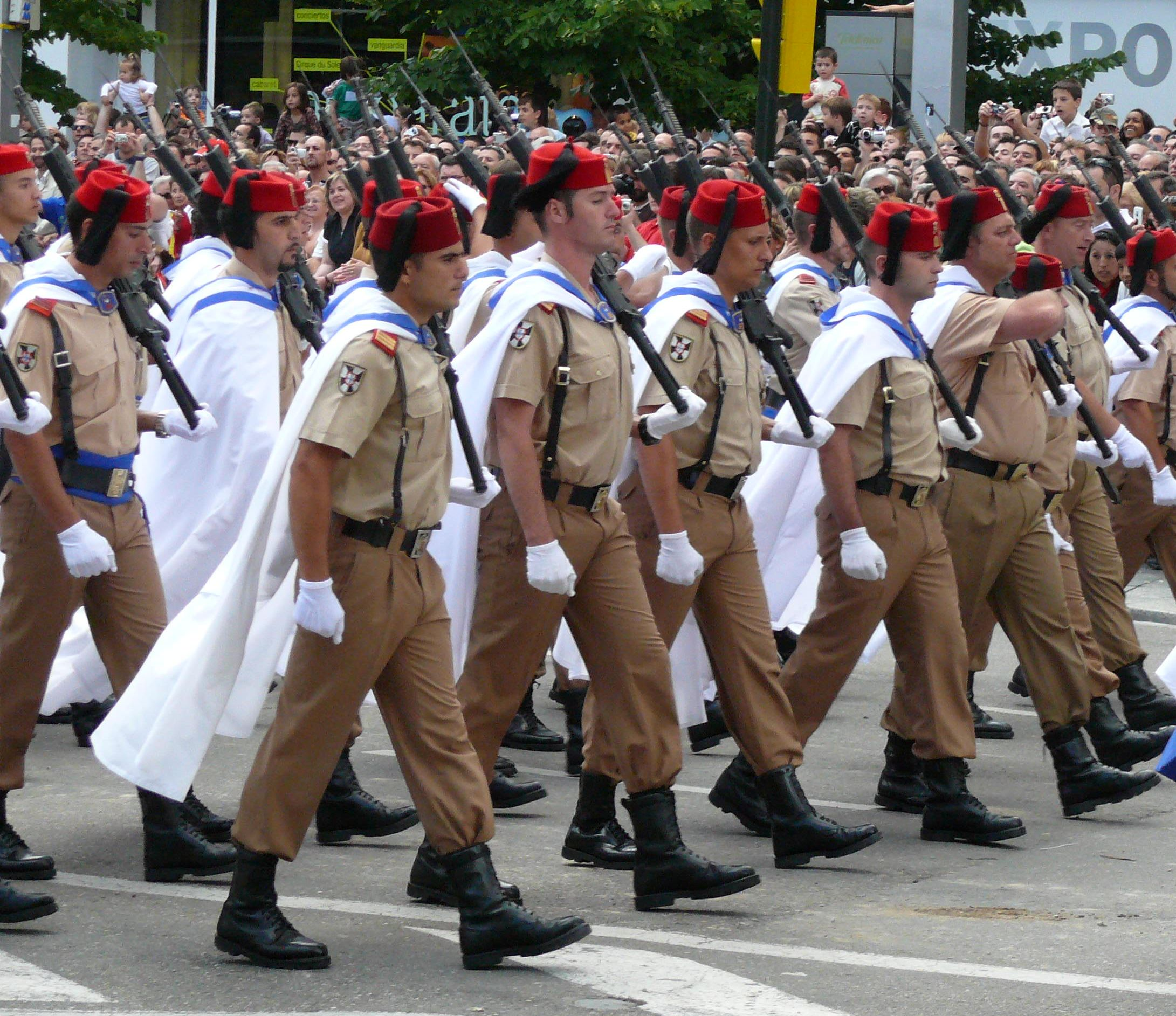
Regulares nº54 of Ceuta marching during the Desfile de las Fuerzas Armadas in Madrid in 2008.

After a brief establishment period during which the Regulares wore white indigenous dress, the new corps was issued with uniforms modelled on those of the French zouaves. During 1913-14 these were replaced by simplified light khaki, worn with red fez caps and sashes. During the 1930s the Regulares were uniformed similarly to the Tiradores de Ifni but without the siroquera. A tarbuch was worn, by the native officers and men, with a sand colored shirt and breeches with brown leather equipment. Spanish officers wore a sand colored variant of the standard Spanish Army uniform with a red topped peaked cap.

Currently the Regulares wear the same camouflage dress for active service and ordinary duties as the rest of the Spanish Army but retain a unique, khaki tropical uniform for semi-formal barrack dress and as the basis of its parade uniform. The most distinctive features of the modern Regulares uniform are the red fez, red or blue sashes and white cloaks (burnous) retained from the Moorish style dress uniforms worn prior to 1956.

== Modern parade march ==
These regiments and their attached battalions march in both quick and slow time on parade and only turn to the slow march when they are ready to render salutes on the march.

=== Military Music Units ===
The military bands and Corps of drums of the Regulares regiments and Tabors are commonly known as the Nubas. They are the same as the normal Spanish Army military bands except that the Corps of Drums is a mix of drums, cymbals, tambourines, bugles, trumpets, bagpipes and chirimias or oboes. At the present time only the Corps of Drums is seen in continuous active service, with military band support usually from other units. It was led by a Bugle Major, who in the past was the assistant of the drum major, until in the 2014 National Day Parade the Corps of Drums of the 54th Regulares Group reinstated the practice of being led by a drum major which was formerly in force in the first decades. Personnel of the Nuba wear the same service full dress as their comrades.

During much of their early years only the 4th Group had a Nuba alongside the regimental military band while the rest had only these field music formations. The two cavalry regiments had trumpet bands instead.

== Depiction in popular culture ==
- The sentence Luchamos contra los moros in the Spanish Republican song Ay Carmela, as well as one of the verses of Si me quieres escribir and the opening line of No pasarán refer to the Regulares.
- The novel Kábila, by the Spanish author and journalist Fernando González Martín, is about a Moroccan who as a teenager hates the Spanish colonial troops but subsequently becomes a soldier of the Regulares, plays a major role in suppressing the Asturias repression and ends up as a high-ranking commanding officer in the military forces of Franco.
- A famous "jota Navarra" sung from the civil war times till now refers to these military units:

Tengo un hermano en el Tercio
Y otro tengo en REGULARES
y el hermano mas pequeño
Preso en Alcalá de Henares.

It remains a popular song that is often heard at "jota" festivals or contests.

== Awards ==
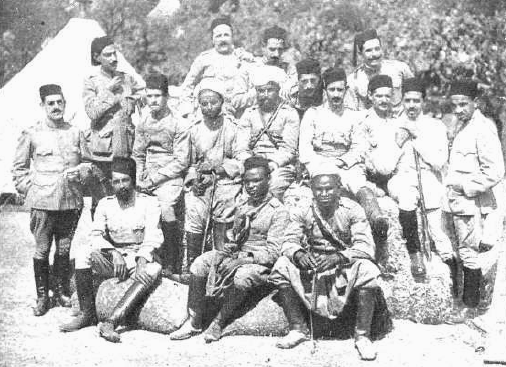
Regulares promoted to sergeants in 1914

Personnel and units of the Regulares have received the following decorations for their roles in both the "Pacification" of Morocco and for their service in Spain (mainly in the Civil War of 1936-1939). Today the Regulares are the most decorated units of the Spanish Army.

- Laureate Cross of San Fernando (Posthumous):
  - Lieutenant Samaniego del Tabor de Caballeria killed in 1912 during the occupation of the Aduar of Haddu al-Lal Kadur.
  - Lieutenant Salustiano Sáenz de Tejada y Olózaga killed on 31 March 1924, when commanding a convoy taken to the position of Issen Lassen.
- Laureate Cross of San Fernando (Collective Medal for Units):
  - II Tabor of the 5th Group, Alhucemas, University City (Parque del Oeste), November 1936.
  - V Tabor of the 3rd Group, Ceuta, for action between 11/15/1936 and 5/19/1937 in the University City of Madrid. University City (Parque del Oeste)
- Collective Military Medal:
  - 4th Group for service at Muires and Haman in 1920 .
  - 3rd Group for service during the battles of Barranco del Lobo and Casabona 1921 .
  - 2nd Group, for service during the battle of Tizzi Assa and Tifaruin 1923 .
  - 1st Group, for valor in the battle of Peñas de Cayat.
  - 5th Group for service at the University City (Parque del Oeste) November 1936.
  - V Tabor of the 2nd Group for service in the Battle of the Ebro 25 July 1938.
  - V Tabor of the 3rd Group, for distinguished service during the operations of Teruel, Maestrazgo and the Ebro. Awarded November 1938.

== See also ==
- Spanish Army
- Army of Africa (Spain)
- Tiradores de Ifni, a similar force raised in Ifni
- Guardia Mora
- Goumier
- Spanish Legion
- Mohamed Meziane
