= Bildiyyīn =

Bildiyyīn or Bildiyīn may refer to:

- "Bildiyyīn" (Moroccan Arabic: بلديين, lit. 'locals' or 'natives'; also 'people of the town'), a social group of new muslims of Jewish descent in the city of Fes, Morocco. See Bildī converts.
- "Bildiyīn" (Moroccan Arabic: بلديين, lit. 'locals' or 'natives'; 'of the country') or "Toshavim" (Hebrew: תושבים, "residents"), also called "forasteros" (foreigners) in Judaeo-Spanish, refer generally to the local Berber or Arabized Maghrebi Jews who had been inhabiting lands in which the Jews expelled from Spain in 15th century settled. In particular, the term was applied to the Jews of Morocco.

== See also ==
- Toshavim and Megorashim
