= Tabor (Morocco) =

Term for Moroccan infantry units

Tabor was the designation given to an irregular unit of indigenous infantry and cavalry recruited in Morocco during the period of French and Spanish intervention and occupation (1908–56).

A tabor was a formation of three or four goums. A goum in this case was the Moroccan equivalent to a company, and a tabor would thereby be equivalent to a battalion. Larger groups of tabors, equivalent to regiments or brigades, were also employed.

== French Morocco ==
While the use of goums as tribal irregulars goes back to the beginning of the 20th century, additional tabors were created by the French during World War II as a display of power because the Germans, after having overrun France, limited the size of their military forces. One way of getting around these restrictions was the creation of auxiliary colonial forces (i.e. tabors) nominally for internal security duties. These Moroccan units would later go on to fight in North Africa once Operation Torch began and in the fight for Sicily (Operation Husky) and Mainland Italy, notably at the Fourth Battle of Monte Cassino. The 4th Tabor of Goums were used in the Fight for Troina in central Sicily.

== Spanish Morocco ==
The Regulares of the Spanish Army were organized into infantry tabors (battalions) and cavalry tabors (squadrons).

The Tiradores de Ifni was also organized in tabors but the also mobilized a bandera.

== See also ==
- Army of Africa (France)
- Army of Africa (Spain)
- Moroccan Goumier for a detailed history of these Moroccan auxiliary units employed by the French colonial authorities from 1908 to 1956.
