= Gandoura =

Long tunic worn in North Africa

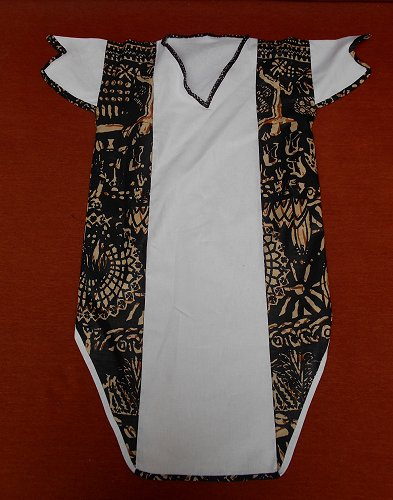
Gandoura

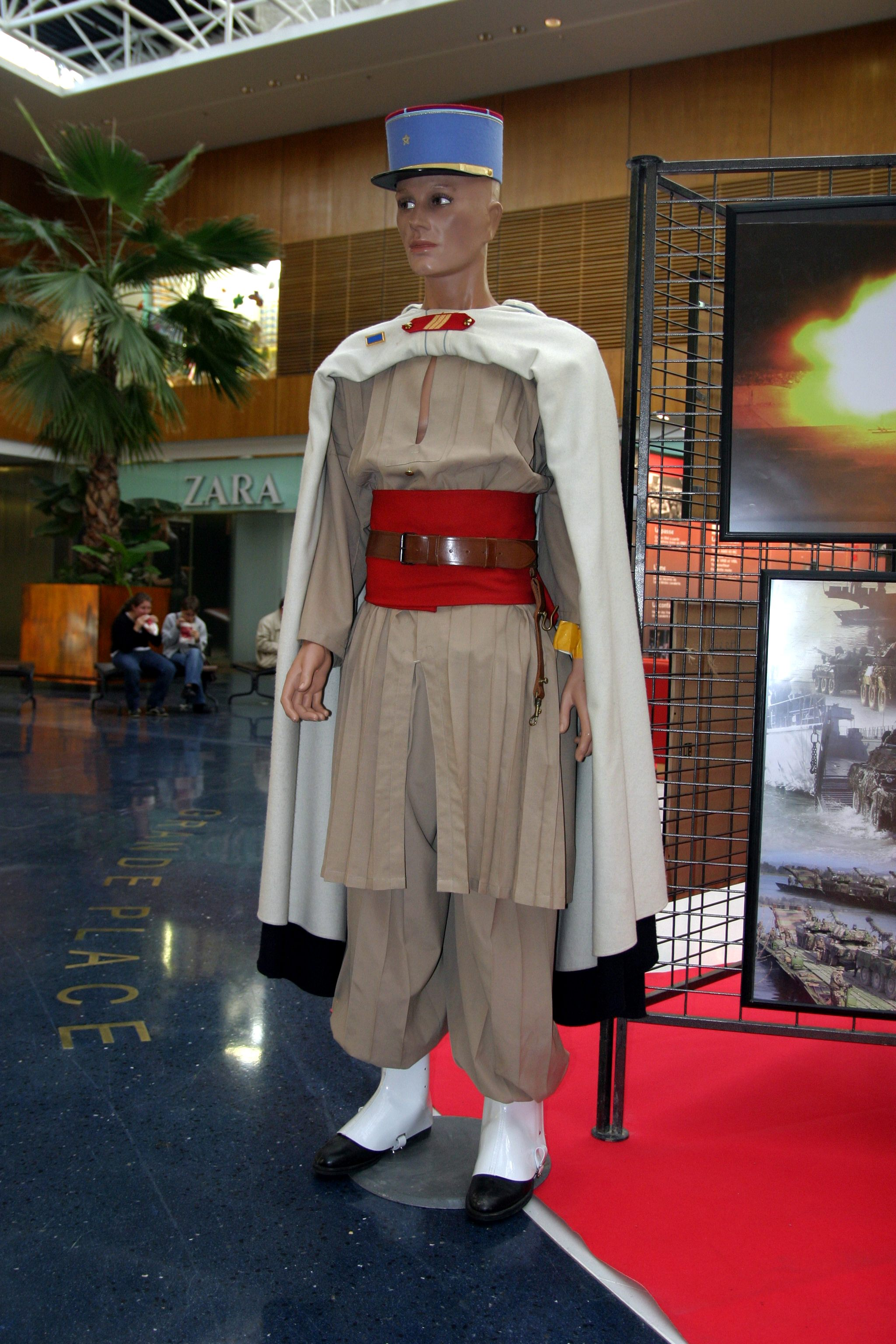
A French Spahi uniform c. 1960 consisting of a khaki gandoura and seroual, both under a white burnous.

The Gandoura, also Gandura (Arabic: قندورة), is a kind of light tunic, in wool or cotton, with or without sleeves. It normally comes in colored stripes, or more simply white, and is worn primarily in North Africa and Western Asia. The term gandoura is Arabic in origin. In Algeria, there are two varieties of gandoura. The first is worn by women and is also known as Jebba Fergani. It is a traditional Algerian garment made of thick velvet that originated in the Constantine region. The other form of gandoura is one worn by Algerian men; it is a casual clothing similar to the Jellaba but it lacks a hood. The presence of the gandoura can be observed in an ancient archaeological site in Takarbine, Aïn M'lila within Algeria, the garment is seen in various ancient monuments in the region and also notably seen in Tighennif.

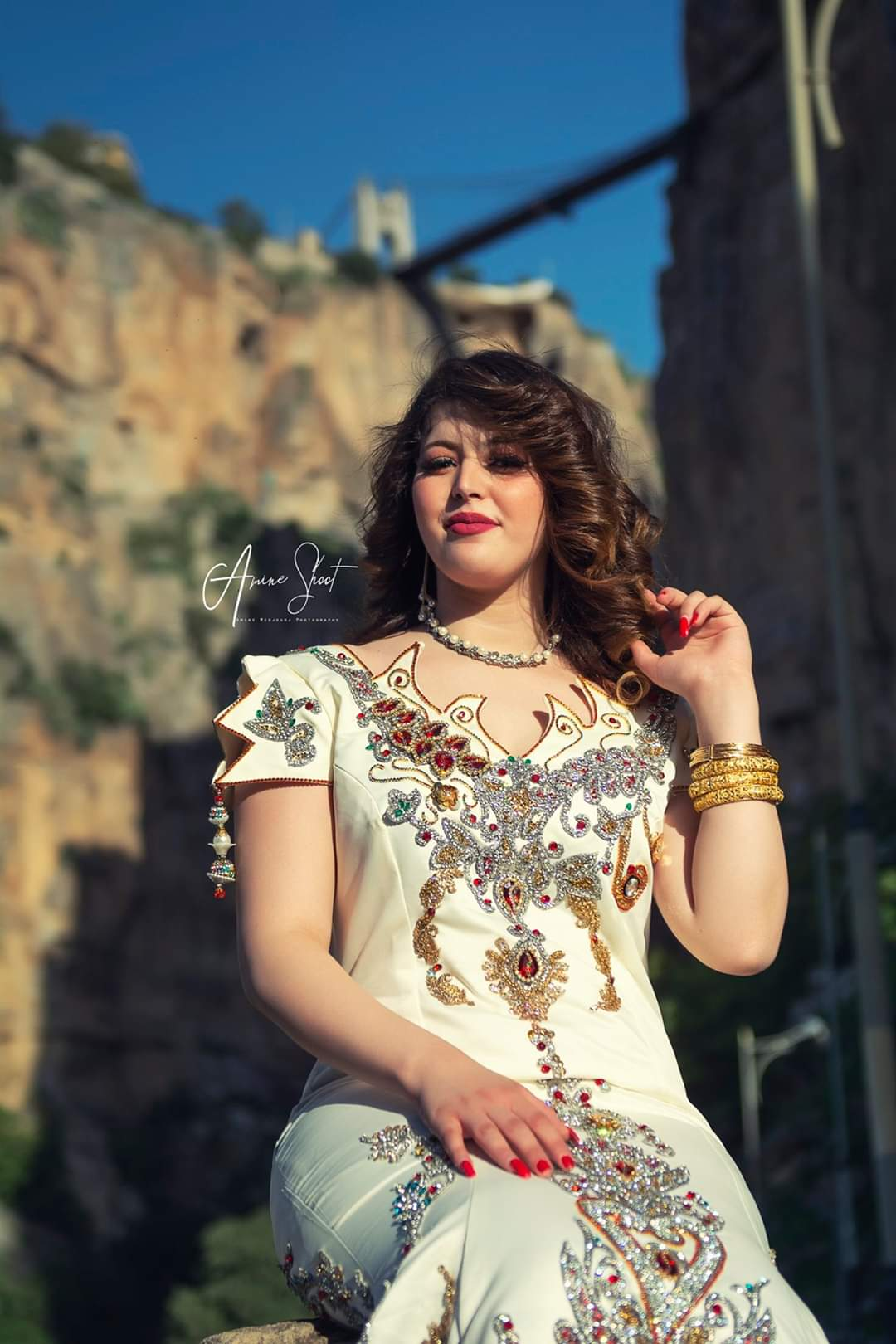
An Algerian woman wearing a traditional gandoura (Fergani)

== See also ==
- Djellaba
- Burnous
- Fez
