= Moroccan Goumier =

Goumier Goum
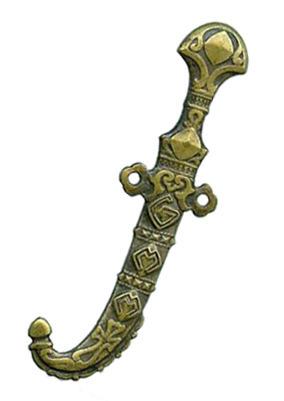
- The standard insignia of the "Mixed Moroccan Goumiers": a koummya (a curved Moorish dagger), inscribed with the letter G (Goum) and featuring gold North African decorations
- Active: 1908–1956
- Country: France and Morocco
- Type: Infantry and mounted detachments
- Part of: French Army
- Engagements: Moroccan colonial campaigns, World War II, Indochina 1946-54

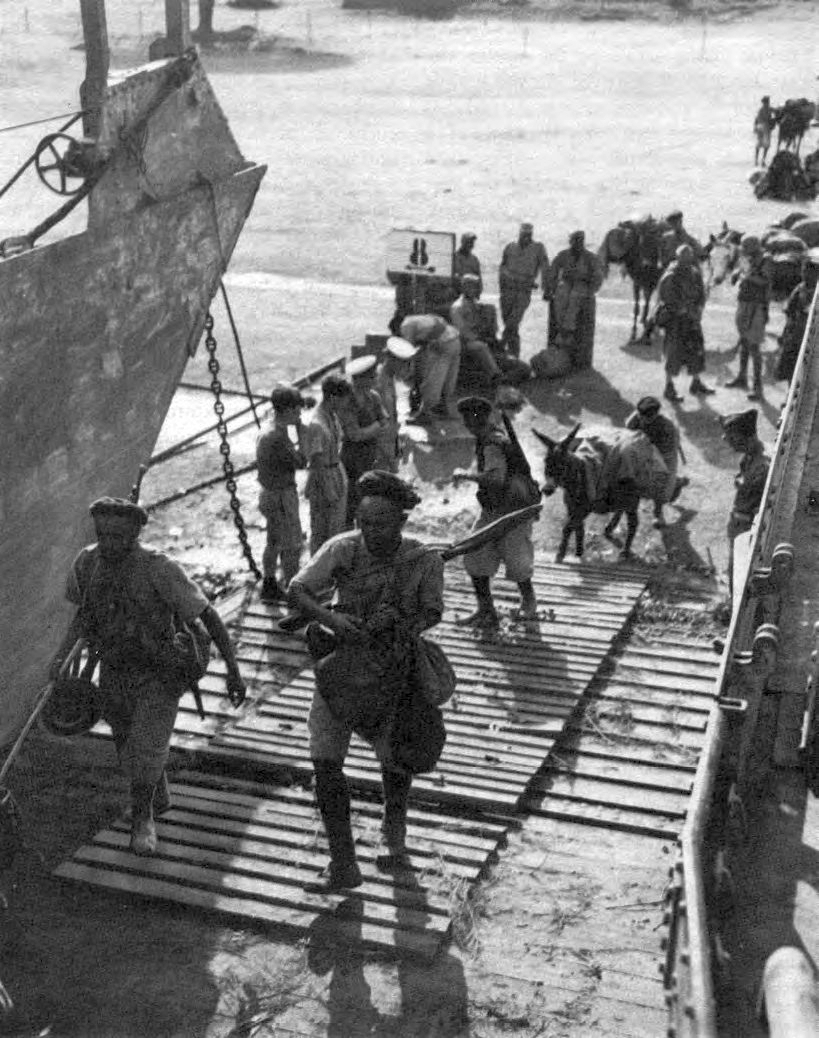
Goumiers of the 2nd Group of Moroccan Tabors boarding a landing craft in Corsica headed to Elba

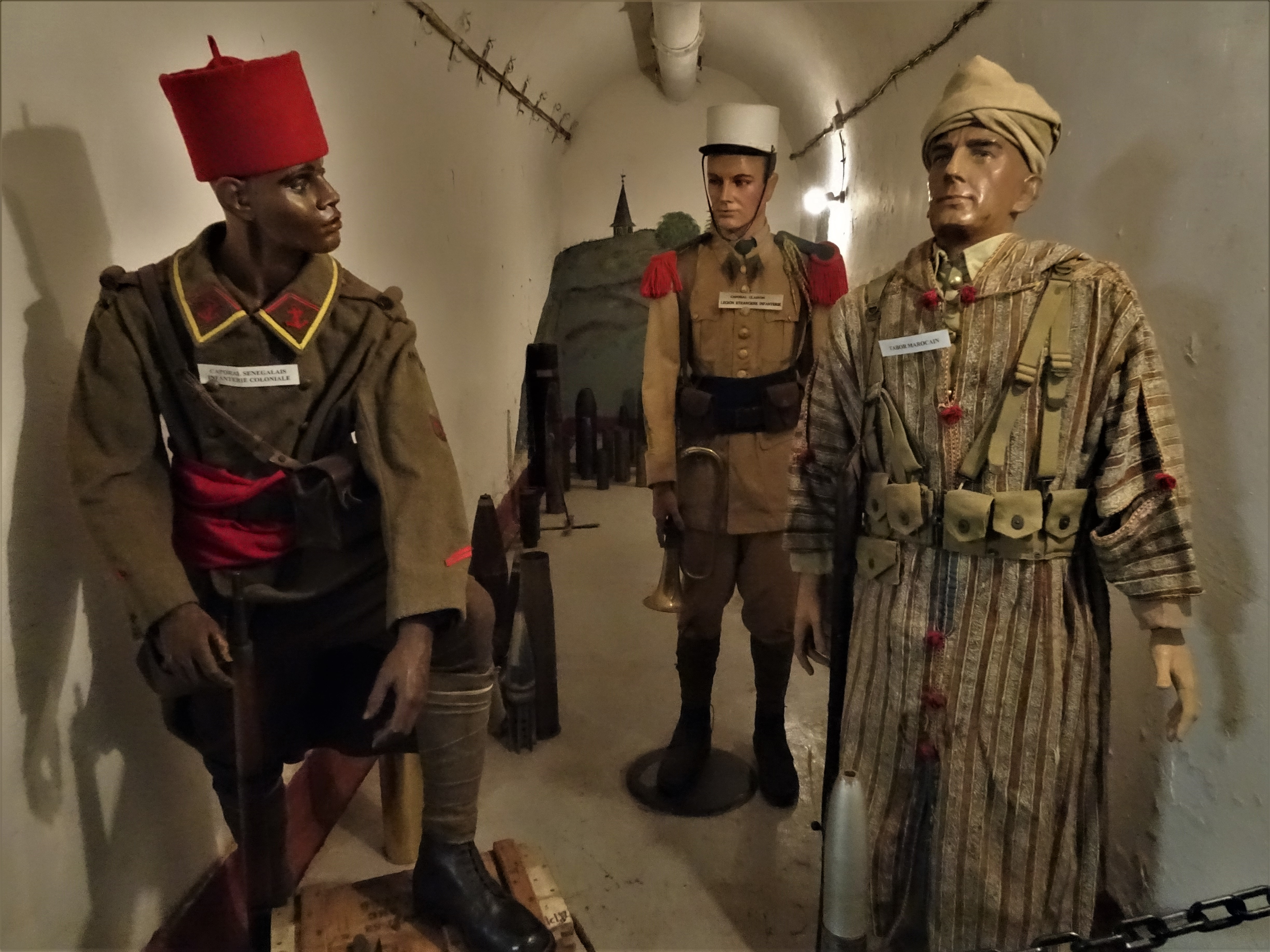
Senegalese left, Foreign Legionnaire middle, Morocacan tabor tabor right

The Moroccan Goumiers (French: Les Goumiers Marocains) were indigenous Moroccan soldiers who served in auxiliary units attached to the French Army of Africa, between 1908 and 1956. While nominally in the service of the Sultan of Morocco, they served under French officers, including a period as part of the Free French Forces.

Employed initially as tribal irregulars, then in regular contingents, the goumiers were employed extensively during the French occupation of Morocco from 1908 to the early 1930s. They then served in North Africa, Italy, and France during World War II between 1942 and 1945. During this period 4 Moroccan tabor groups (groupes de tabors marocains – GTM) were created, each comprising 3 tabors (battalions), and each tabor comprising 3 or 4 goums (companies). Goumiers subsequently served in Indochina from 1946 to 1954.

== Etymology ==
The term goum designated a company of goumiers. It originates from gūm, the equivalent in the Arabic of the Maghreb of Classical Arabic qawm, designating "tribe" or "people". The term also refers to mounted contingents of Arab or Berber horsemen employed by tribal leaders during North African campaigns.

The term tabor is originally a Turkish designation of tabur making reference to a battalion or by the intermediary Arab ṭābūr, also originally a Turkish designation.

The word originated in the Maghrebi Arabic word Koum (قوم), which means "people". The non-specific designation "goumi" (French version "goumier") was used to circumvent tribal distinctions and enable volunteers from different regions to serve together in mixed units for a "common" cause. The president of Egypt Jamal Abdel Nasser also used the same designation (koum or koumia) to build the new United Arab Republic.

In French military terminology, a goum was a unit of 200 auxiliaries. Three or four goums made up a tabor. An engine or groupe was composed of three tabors. A goum in this case was the equivalent of a company in regular military units and a tabor would thereby be equivalent to a battalion. A tabor was the largest permanent goumier unit.

In addition to colonial campaigns during the first half of the 20th century, goumiers were employed as auxiliaries by the French Army in Italy during World War II. These irregular infantry came from the Atlas Mountains of Morocco where they were recruited from the indigenous Berber tribes.

== Origins ==
The designation of "goumiers" was originally given to tribal irregulars employed as allies by the French Army in southern Algeria. These mounted auxiliaries operated under their own tribal leadership and were entirely distinct from the regular Muslim cavalry (Spahi) and infantry (Tirailleur) regiments of the French Armée d'Afrique. After 1870 the Algerian goums were replaced by the permanent indigenous corps.

Subsequently, tribal police auxiliaries serving with the French gendarmerie in the settled areas of Morocco were also known as goumiers.

== Morocco, 1908–1934 ==
Algerian goumiers were employed during the initial stages of the French intervention in Morocco, commencing in 1908. After their terms of enlistment expired, the Algerians returned to their homeland, but the advantages of indigenous irregulars were such that they were replaced by Moroccan levies. Retaining the designation of goumiers, the Moroccans served in detachments under French officers, and initially mostly Algerian NCOs, both of whom were usually seconded from the Spahis and Tirailleurs. Moroccan sous-officers were in due course appointed.

These semi-permanently employed Moroccan goumiers were initially raised as six separate detachments of local militia by General Albert D'Amade in 1908, to patrol recently-occupied areas. Goumiers also served as scouts and in support of regular French troops, and in 1911 they became permanent units.

Nominally, the goumiers were under the control of the Sultan of Morocco, but in practice, they formed an extension of the French Army and subsequently fought for France in third countries (see below). However, their biggest involvement was in Morocco itself during the period of French "pacification". As noted below, the goum units had the formal status of local police, though they fought and served as an integral part of the French Army of Africa. This had initially been a political subterfuge, since following the Algeciras Conference of 1906, France had undertaken not to recruit regular Moroccan troops while the Sultan remained nominal ruler of the country. With the outbreak of World War I this restraint was lifted and the French enlisted large numbers of regular Moroccan tirailleurs, spahis and artillerymen. The goumiers had however proven so valuable as auxiliaries that they continued their dual roles as tribal police and combat troops.

Initially, the Moroccan Goums wore tribal dress with only blue cloaks as uniform items, but as they achieved permanent status they adopted the distinctive brown and grey striped jellaba (a hooded Moroccan cloak) that was to remain their trademark throughout their history with the French Army. Their normal headdress was a turban. Goums included both infantry and cavalry elements. Their traditional and favoured weapons were sabres or elongated daggers.

An equivalent force known as the Mehal-La Jalifiana was raised in Spanish Morocco using France's goumiers as a model.

== World War I ==
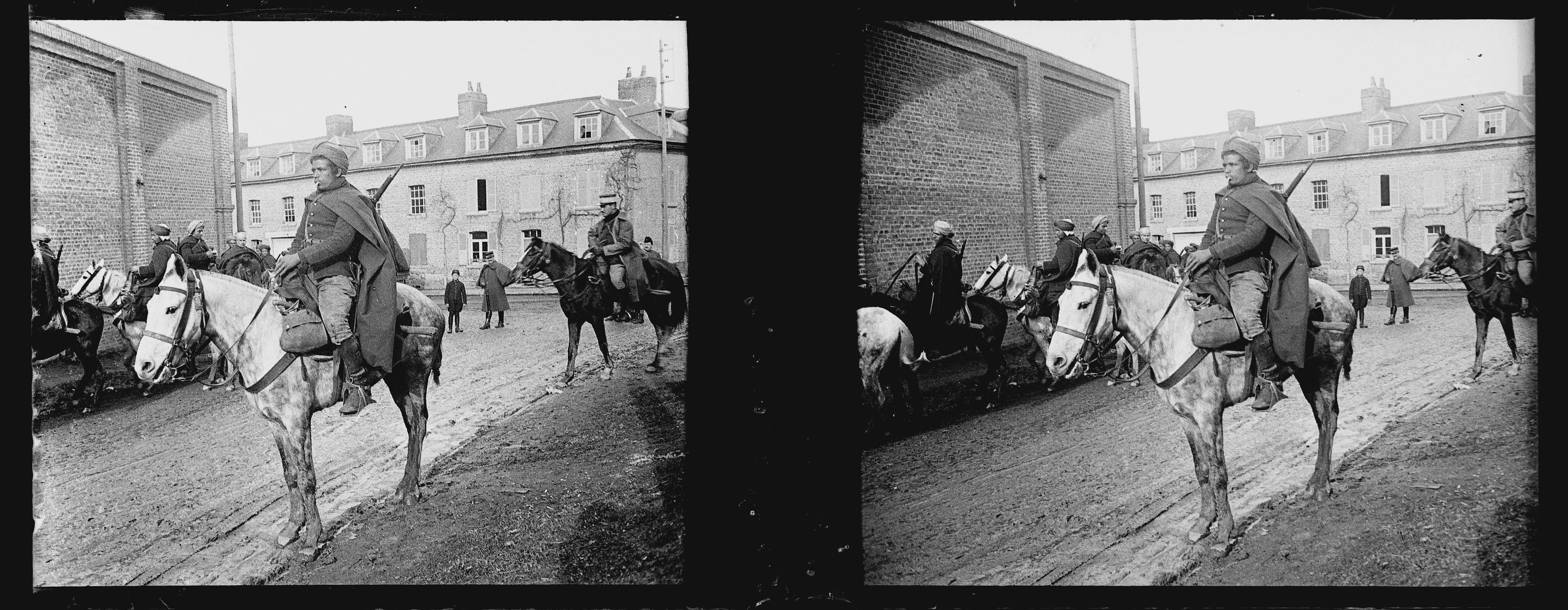
A Goumier cavalryman (in this case an Algerian spahi irregular) at Saleux (Somme), May–June 1915 during World War I.

The Moroccan Goumiers did not see service outside Morocco during the First World War, although the term was sometimes used for detachments of Algerian spahi irregulars employed in Flanders in late 1914. Their existence did, however, enable General Hubert Lyautey to withdraw a substantial portion of the regular French military forces from Morocco for service on the Western Front.

== Between the world wars ==
By 1924 twenty-seven Goum units were in the French service. They comprised mixed detachments of about three-quarters infantry and one-quarter cavalry. Together with partisan tribal irregulars the goumiers numbered about 10,000 men. French officers and NCOs continued to be seconded from regular units. Remaining separate from the regular Moroccan regiments of the French Armée d'Afrique, the Goumiers gave valuable service during the Rif Wars of the 1920s. They subsequently became a form of gendarmerie, keeping order in rural districts of Morocco.

Diagram illustrating the composition of a Moroccan Goum during the late Interwar Period.

In the latter half of the 1930s, there were roughly 50 Goums. The organization of a Moroccan Goum was as follows:

- Three infantry platoons (sections), each with an FM light machine gun.
- One cavalry platoon.
- One machine gun group.
- One mule train with 25 animals.

The manpower strength of a Goum during this period was 161 Moroccan Goumiers and 10 French officers and NCOs.

== World War II ==
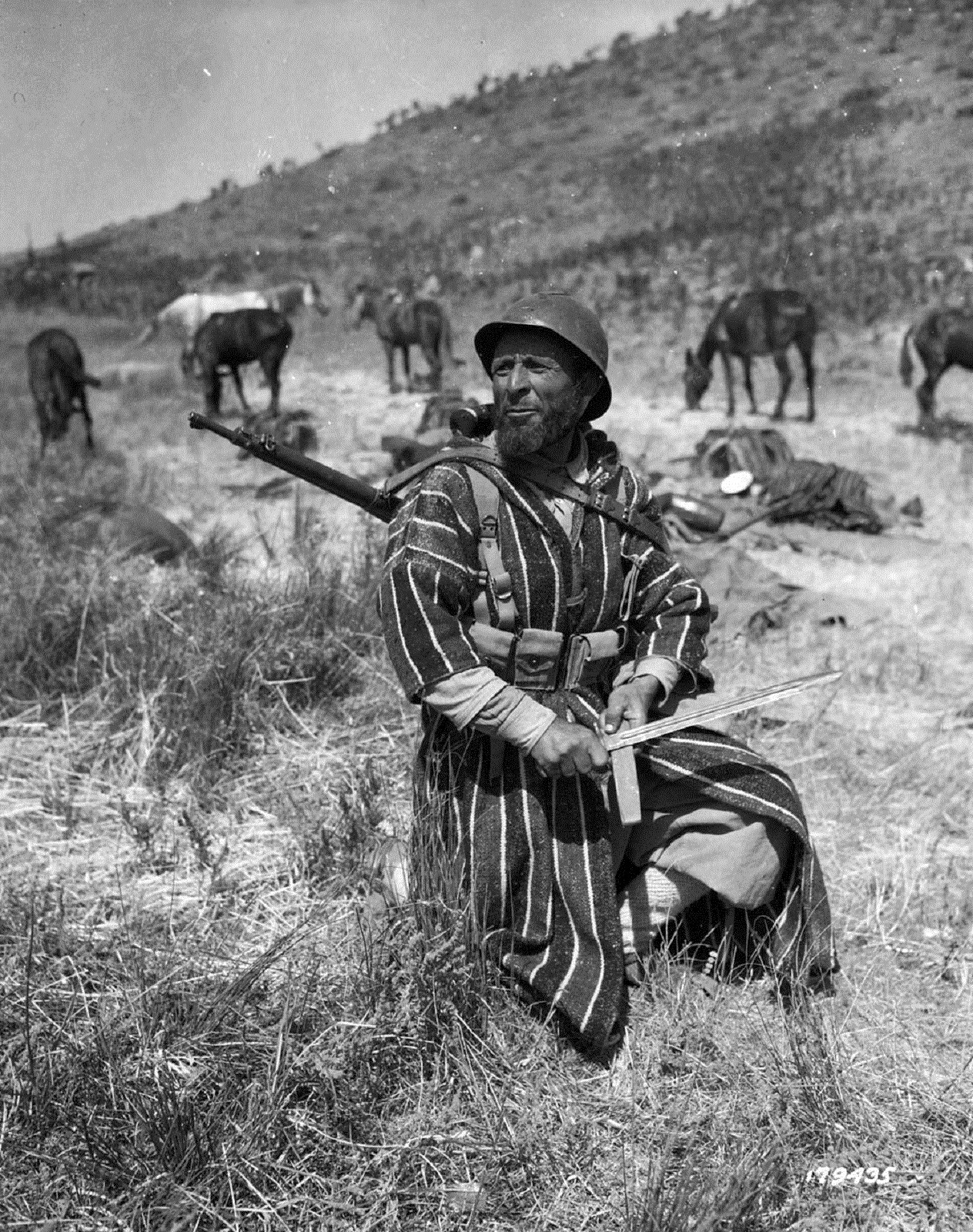
A "Goum" featured in Yank magazine, shown sharpening his bayonet.

Four Moroccan groups (regimental-sized units, about 12,000 men in total) served with the Allied forces during World War II. They specialised in night raiding operations, and fought against the forces of Fascist Italy and Nazi Germany during 1942–1945. Goumier units were also used to man the front lines in mountainous and other rough terrain areas, freeing regular Allied infantry units to operate along more profitable axes of advance.

=== North Africa 1939–1942 ===
In 1939 there were 57 regular Goums in Morocco, numbered 1 to 57. Sixteen Goums were deployed along the southern border and the rest were used as mobilizing Goums, being broken up to provide trained cadres for 64 new Auxiliary Goums (Goums de Marche). These were numbered 100 + the number of the mobilizing Goum (i.e. the 107e Goum de Marche was mobilized with cadres from the 7e Goum). A second and third series of Goums de Marche, with numbers in the 200s and 300s respectively, were raised in 1940.

A Goum de Marche had three infantry platoons, each composed of 26 goumiers, 4 Moroccan NCOs, and 1 French NCO. It was divided into three groups, two with an FM light machine gun, and one with three VB rifle grenadiers. The goumiers were normally armed with Berthier rifles. The infantry platoons were supported by a machine gun platoon with two 8mm machine guns, typically the Hotchkiss mle 1914. An 11-man cavalry group was attached for reconnaissance. Supplies were carried by mule train.

Diagram depicting the organization of a Goum de Marche in 1940.

Diagram depicting the organization of a Groupement de Goums in 1940.

The Goums were grouped together into Groupements de Goums, of four Goums each. These groupements, which were roughly battalion-sized, added a command platoon with an ER 17 radio set, and a weapons platoon, with two 81mm mortars and a 37mm TRP mle 1916 infantry gun. In 1939 the possibility of combining the first 8 Groupements into a brigade was considered, but ultimately not pursued.

By June of 1940, the authorized strength of a Groupement was 12 officers, 30 NCOs, and 800 Goumiers, with 188 horses and mules, one light vehicle, and two trucks. Sixteen groups were formed by the time of the June 1940 armistice. The 1^{st}, 3^{rd}, 5^{th} and 7^{th} Groupements were grouped together in June 1940 to form the 1st Group of Moroccan Auxiliaries (French: 1^{er} Groupe de Supplétifs Marocains – G.S.M.), which was sent to southern Tunisia to reinforce the Mareth Line against an invasion from Italian Libya. These groups saw combat against Italian forces between 10 and 25 June.

After the armistice of 1940, the Goums were returned to Morocco. To evade strict German limits on how many troops France could maintain in North Africa, the Goumiers were described as having Gendarmerie-type functions, such as maintenance of public order and the surveillance of frontiers, while maintaining military armament, organization, and discipline.

=== Tunisia, 1942–43 ===
The 1st GSM (Groupe de Supplétifs Marocains) fought on the Tunisian front as part of the Moroccan March Division from December 1942, and was joined by the 2nd GSM in January 1943.

The 15th Army Group commander, British General Harold Alexander considered the French Moroccan Goumiers as "great fighters" and gave them to the allies to help them to take Bizerte and Tunis.

Reorganization

Diagram depicting the organization of a Moroccan Goum in 1943.

Diagram depicting the organization of a Moroccan Tabor in 1943.

Diagram depicting the organization of a Group of Moroccan Tabors in 1943

After the Tunisia Campaign, the French organized two additional groups and retitled the groups as Groupes de Tabors Marocains (G.T.M.). Meanwhile, the Goums were reorganized and received new arms and equipment, as part of the allied rearmament of the Army of Liberation.

Each Goum was divided into three combat sections (platoons), each composed of two FM (light machine gun) groups and one assault group. The command group included a group of mounted scouts, a machine gun group, a 60mm mortar, an anti-tank squad equipped with bazookas, and a mule train. Each Goum consisted of 209 Moroccan soldiers, 12 French NCOs, and 2 French officers. Authorized armament included 9 FM light machine guns, 2 machine guns, 1 mortar, 4 bazookas, 21 submachine guns, and 9 rifle grenade launchers. Communications equipment included one SCR-284 radio and four SCR-536 radios. For transportation, the Goum was authorized 28 mules, 14 horses, 1 jeep and one 2.5 ton truck.

A Tabor consisted of three Goums plus a Command and Weapons Goum (Goum de Commandement et d'Engins de Tabor, GCE). The GCE included a command group, a cavalry platoon with 3 FMs, a mortar section with four 81mm mortars, a transmissions group, and a logistics group (groupe du train) which included a mule train and medical personnel. The Command Goum consisted of 174 Moroccans, 11 French NCOs and 7 French officers. Communications equipment included one SCR-195 radio and four SCR-284s. Transportation was provided by 70 horses, 40 mules, 4 jeeps and four 2.5 ton trucks.

A G.T.M. consisted of three tabors and Command and Weapons Goum (Goum de Commandement et d'Engins de G.T.M., GCE). This GCE included a command group, a platoon of 25 mounted messengers (estafettes), a weapons platoon (section d'engins) which included three anti-tank guns and four 81mm mortars, a security and pioneer platoon (section de protection et de pionniers), a transmissions group and a logistics group with both mule and automobile components. Authorized personnel consisted of 245 Moroccan Goumiers, 32 French NCOs and 11 French officers. Authorized transportation included 39 horses, 38 mules, 5 jeeps, 1 command car, four 2.5 ton trucks, three 1.5 ton trucks, and 4 ambulances.

From the summer of 1943 onwards, the Goumiers used primarily American armament, aside from the French FM 24/29 light machine gun. Heavier firepower was provided by the M1919 medium machine gun. Springfield M1903 and Enfield M1917 bolt-action rifles, as well as the semi-automatic M1 Carbine were widely-issued, while assault groups utilized the Thompson submachine gun. Goumiers were visually distinguished by their use of the M1917 Brodie Helmet, typically covered with a helmet cover or camouflage netting.

Separate from the groups, the 14th Tabor did not participate in the fighting in Europe and remained in Morocco to keep public order for the remainder of the war.

=== Italy, 1943–1945 ===
The 4th Tabor of Moroccan Goums fought in the Sicilian Campaign, landing at Licata on 14 July 1943, and was attached to the U.S. Seventh Army, commanded by Lieutenant General George S. Patton. The Goumiers of the 4th Tabor were attached to the U.S. 1st Infantry Division on 27 July 1943 and were recorded in the U.S. 26th Infantry Regiment's log files for their courage. Upon their arrival many Italian soldiers surrendered en masse, while the Germans began staging major retreats away from the known presence of Goumiers.

The Italian campaign of World War II is perhaps the most famous and most controversial in the history of the Goumiers. The 4th Group of Moroccan Tabors shipped out for Italy in November 1943 and was followed in January 1944 by the 3rd Group, then reinforced by the 1st Group in April 1944. A total of 73,000 Moroccans (both auxiliary Goumiers and regular Tirailleurs) served in Italy during 1943-45. All were volunteers under the terms of the agreement establishing the Protectorate in 1912.

In Italy, the Allies suffered a long stalemate at the German Gustav Line. In May 1944, three Goumier groupes, under the name Corps de Montagne, were the vanguard of the French Expeditionary Corps's attack, through the Aurunci Mountains during Operation Diadem, the fourth and final Battle of Monte Cassino. The corps was under the orders of General Alphonse Juin. "Here the Goums more than proved their value as light, highly mobile mountain troops who could penetrate the most vertical terrain in fighting order and with a minimum of logistical requirements. Most military analysts consider the Goumiers' manoeuvre as the critical victory that finally opened the way to the Italian capital of Rome."

The U.S. Fifth Army commander, Lieutenant General Mark W. Clark, also paid tribute to the Goumiers and the Moroccan regulars of the Tirailleur units:

In spite of the stiffening enemy resistance, the 2nd Moroccan Infantry Division penetrated the Gustave [sic] Line in less than two day's [sic] fighting. The next 48 hours on the French front were decisive. The knife-wielding Goumiers swarmed over the hills, particularly at night, and General Juin's entire force showed an aggressiveness hour after hour that the Germans could not withstand. Cerasola, San Giorgio, Mt. D'Oro, Ausonia and Esperia were seized in one of the most brilliant and daring advances of the war in Italy... For this performance, which was to be a key to the success of the entire drive on Rome, I shall always be a grateful admirer of General Juin and his magnificent FEC.

During their fighting in the Italian Campaign, the Goumiers suffered 3,000 casualties, of which 600 were killed in action.

==== Reported atrocities ====
The military achievements of the Goumiers in Italy were accompanied by widespread reports of war crimes: "...exceptional numbers of Moroccans were executed—many without trial—for allegedly murdering, raping, and pillaging their way across the Italian countryside. The French authorities sought to defuse the problem by importing numbers of Berber women to serve as "camp followers" in rear areas set aside exclusively for the Goumiers." According to Italian sources, more than 7,000 people were raped by Goumiers. Those rapes, later known in Italy as Marocchinate, were against women, children and men, including one priest who tried to defend two girls. The mayor of Esperia (a comune in the Province of Frosinone) reported that in his town, 700 women out of 2,500 inhabitants were raped and that some had died as a result. In northern Latium and southern Tuscany, it is alleged that the Goumiers raped and occasionally killed women and young men after the Germans retreated, including members of partisan formations.

A British journalist commented, "The Goums have become a legend, a joke.... No account of their rapes or their other acts is too eccentric to be passed off as true."

In his book Up Front, American war cartoonist Bill Mauldin referred to the silent killing of one of a pair of sleeping soldiers (thus leaving one alive to awaken and find the other) as "an old Ghoum trick."

The French Expeditionary Force executed 15 soldiers by firing squad and sentenced 54 others to hard labor in military prisons for acts of rape or murder. In 2015, the Italian state recognized compensation for a victim of these events.

=== Corsica, 1943 ===
In September 1943 the 2nd Group of Moroccan Tabors participated in the liberation of Corsica, and fought the Germans in the mountains near Bastia, by Cape Corse.

=== Elba, 1944 ===
The 2nd Group of Moroccan Tabors was part of the French Forces that took Elba from the Germans in June 1944. The operation was called Operation Brassard. The island was more heavily defended than expected, and there were many casualties on both sides as a result of the severe fighting.

=== Mainland France, 1944 ===
The 1st, 2nd, and 3rd Groups of Moroccan Tabors and various others regiments and auxiliaries from infantry to regular groups fought in the campaigns in southern France, Vosges Mountains, along the Atlantic dismantling the abandoned the Atlantic walls defences, and Alsace during late 1944 and early 1945. about 250,000 to 300,000 Moroccan soldiers participated in the liberation of France. The Moroccans started landing in southern France on 18 August 1944. From liberating Sardinia, Corsica and Elba the Moroccan–Allied forces landed in Province via operation Dragoon, then took part in the combat to liberate Marseille from 20 to 28 August 1944. The 1st Group was subsequently used to secure France's Alpine frontier with Italy until late October 1944, and then took part in the forcing of the Belfort Gap in November. During late September and early October 1944, the 2nd and 6th Groups fought in the areas of Remiremont and Gérardmer. All three groups fought in the Vosges Mountains during November and December 1944, facing extremely cold weather and bitter German resistance. After hard fighting in the Vosges Mountains and the Colmar Pocket, the 3rd Group was repatriated to Morocco in April 1945. It was replaced in Europe by the 4th Group, which had returned to North Africa after Allied forces left Italy.

=== Germany, 1945 ===
The 1st, 2nd, and 4th Groups of Moroccan Tabors fought in the final operations to overrun southwestern Germany in 1945. The 1st Group fought through the Siegfried Line in the Bienwald from 20 to 25 March 1945. In April 1945, the 1st and 4th Groups took part in the fighting to seize Pforzheim. During the last weeks of the war, the 2nd Group fought in the Black Forest and pushed southeast to Germany's Austrian border. During the same period, the 1st and 4th Groups advanced with other French forces on Stuttgart and Tübingen.

The 3rd (3e Tabor Marocain) occupied an area between Stuttgart and Tübingen from about April 20, 1945. When they got to Waldenbuch, they entered every house and raped and plundered. Some women were badly injured. Pastor Pfäfflin managed to get them to the Hospital in Tübingen. The pastor wrote a protest note to the International Red Cross. After the total surrender of Germany on 8 May 1945, a military government was established in Stuttgart. This ended the rape and pillaging.

By mid-1946, all three groups had been repatriated to Morocco.

Goumier casualties in World War II from 1942 to 1945 totaled 8,018, of which 1,625 were killed in action.

== Indochina, 1949–1954 ==
Following World War II Moroccan goumiers saw service in French Indo-China from June 1949 until the fall of Dien Bien Phu in 1954. Stationed in the northern frontier zone of Tonkin, the goumier units were used mainly for convoy escort and quadrillage de zone (regional search and destroy) duties. By contrast with the regular Moroccan tirailleurs, who enlisted for fixed terms of service, the goumiers were contracted to serve specifically in Indo-China for the period of hostilities only.

As in previous campaigns, the goumiers were organised in battalion sized Tabors, each comprising several Goums or companies. The proportion of French officers to Moroccan other ranks was low, with normally only two in each company. Locally recruited Indochinese auxiliaries were attached to each Tabor as reconnaissance units. Brigaded for administrative purposes in the Groupement de Tabors Marocain d'Extreme Orient there were, at any one time, usually three Tabors serving in Indochina during the war against the Viet Minh. In October 1950 the 11e Tabor was overrun at Na Kheo, with only 369 survivors out of 924 goumiers and French officers.

During this, their final campaign in French service, the goumiers continued, at least for parade and in cold weather, to wear the distinctive flat-topped turbans and brown-striped djellabas that had distinguished these units since 1911.

== Following Moroccan independence ==
With Moroccan independence in 1956, the Goums were incorporated into the new Royal Army of Morocco. Following negotiations between the French, Spanish and Moroccan governments, it was agreed that both regular and auxiliary Moroccan units could be transferred into the new Forces Armées Royales or FAR.

Fourteen thousand Moroccan personnel were accordingly transferred from French service. The modern Moroccan military includes Auxiliary Force Companies. They have an overlapping rural policing role and are in that sense the successors of the Goumiers.

== Traditions ==
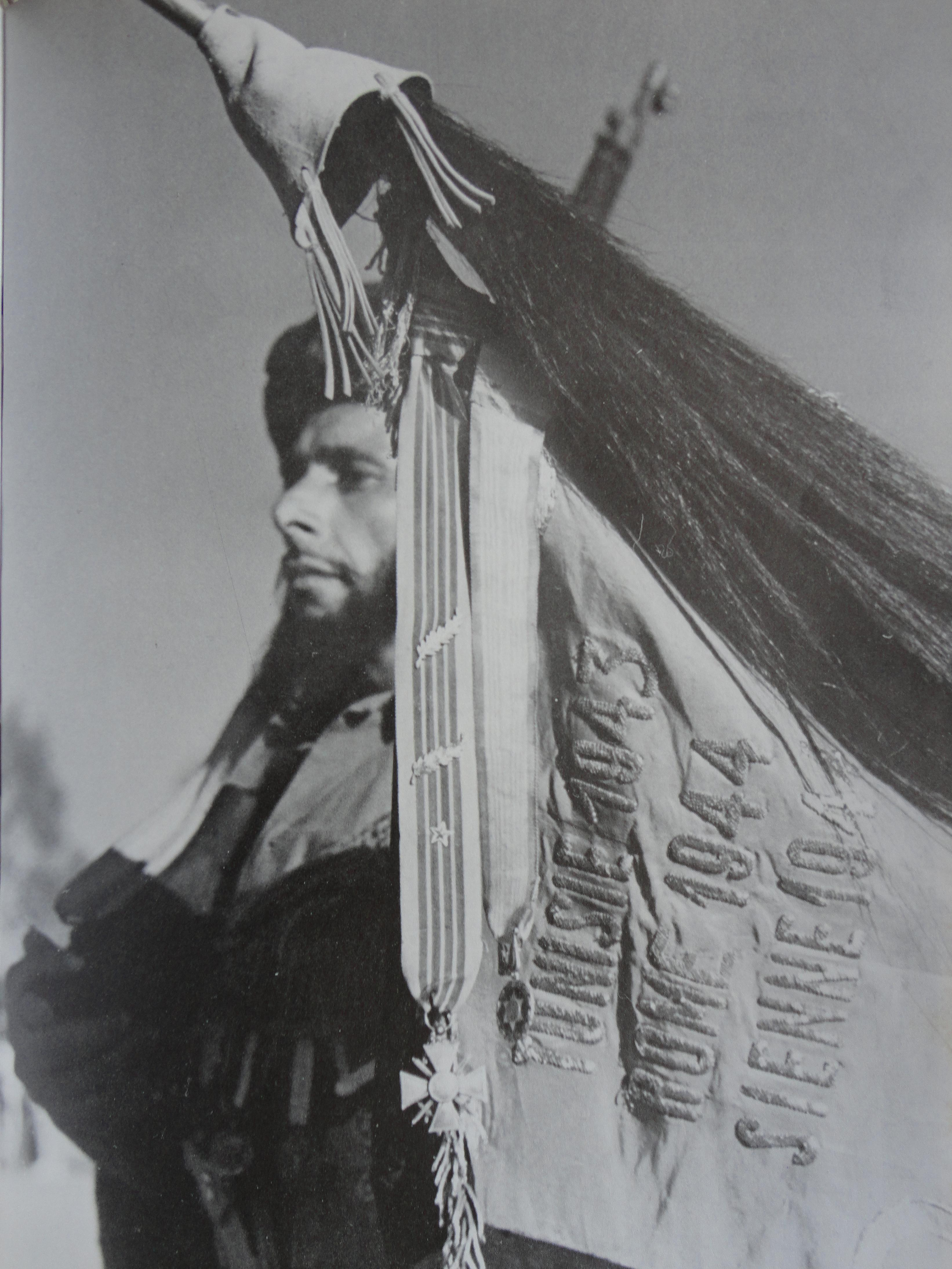
Fanion of the 1^{e}GTM.

=== Decorations ===
In France, citations made during World War I, World War II or colonial conflicts were accompanied with awards of a Croix de Guerre (Cross of War) with attachments on the ribbon depending on the degree of citation: the lowest being represented by a bronze star (for those who had been cited at the regiment or brigade level) while the highest degree is represented by a bronze palm (for those who had been cited at the army level). A unit can be mentioned in Despatches. Its flag is then decorated with the corresponding Croix. After two citations in Army Orders, the men of the unit concerned are all entitled to wear a fourragère.

==== Second World war ====
In total, between 1942 and 1945, the Group of Tabors, Tabors and Goums earned the Croix de Guerre with bronze palm (Army level) seventeen times and the Croix de Guerre with silver gilt star (corps level) nine times:

- The 2nd Group of Tabors were awarded the fourragère (colors of the médaille militaire) for having earned the Croix de Guerre with bronze palm four times
- The 1st, 3rd and 4th Groups of Tabors were awarded the fourragère for having earned the Croix de Guerre with bronze palm two or three times

==== First Indochina War ====
- The 1st and 5th tabors were awarded the fourragère for having earned the Croix de Guerre with bronze palm two or three times

In 1945, the Goumiers received their first flag, from Charles de Gaulle. In 1952 this standard was awarded the Legion of Honour, the highest decoration in France. (Note: Its flag is decorated with the insignia of a knight, which is a different award than the fourragère.)

== In fiction ==
A scene in which women are raped by goumiers during the 1944 Italian Campaign of World War II has a key role in Alberto Moravia's 1958 novel Two Women (Orig. title in Italian La Ciociara) and the 1960 film based on the novel starring Sophia Loren.

Similarly, in the novel Point of Honor by Mortimer R. Kadish (1951), whose setting is the American Army campaign in Italy in 1944, the closing pages depict the protection by Americans of Italian villagers against a threat of rape and murder by "Ayrab" or "Goum" troops.

In Derek Miller’s 2024 novel, The Curse of Paulo Houdini, set during the Battle of Montecassino, goumiers commit rapes and murders leading to the death of the title character.

In the video game Cultist Simulator and its sequel Book of Hours, Lalla Chaima is a Berber Moroccan monster-huntress who had once served in the goumiers, and wears the distinctive grey-brown jellabiya of the Moroccan auxiliaries. Her father Navil, a marabout in Marrakesh, is of the opposite inclination - healing monsters and protecting occult creatures. The two are aligned with opposing sides of the cosmic war between Colonel and Lionsmith, but nonetheless have a loving relationship.

== See also ==
- Indigènes: a Drama French film presenting the story of four Moroccans & Algerians tirailleurs which was awarded the Prix d'interprétation masculine du Festival de Cannes at the 2006 Cannes Film Festival.
- La Ciociara

Similar organizations

- Regulares
- Harki
