= Neves (surname) =

Origin
- Meaning: snows
- Region of origin: Portugal

Other names
- Variant form: Nieves

Neves, is the Portuguese word for the plural form of "snow" (Portuguese: neve). It is a common surname in Portugal, Italy, Brazil, and the Spanish region of Galicia. Its Spanish cognate is Nieves.

The surname is supposedly connected to the veneration of Nossa Senhora das Neves (meaning "Our Lady of the Snows"), the name being given to a village in the northwest of Portugal.

== People with this name ==
=== Sportspeople ===
==== Footballers ====
- Bruno Ferraz das Neves (born 1984), Brazilian footballer
- Carlos César Neves (born 1987), Brazilian footballer
- Carlos das Neves (born 1968). South African footballer and coach
- Cristiano dos Santos Neves (born 1981), Brazilian footballer
- Daniel Soares Neves (born 1980), Brazilian-Spanish footballer
- Denílson Pereira Neves (born 1988), Brazilian footballer
- Diego Neves (born 1986), Brazilian footballer
- Domingos Neves (fl. 1925), Portuguese footballer
- Eugénio Neves (born 1987), Portuguese footballer
- Fernando Pascoal Neves, (1947–1973), Portuguese footballer
- Gylmar dos Santos Neves (1930–2013), Brazilian footballer
- Hermes Neves Soares (born 1975), Brazilian footballer
- Hernâni Neves (born 1963), Portuguese footballer and beach soccer player
- Jedaias Capucho Neves (born 1979), Brazilian footballer
- João Neves (born 2004), Portuguese footballer
- Joaquim Neves (born 1970), Portuguese footballer
- Jorge Neves (footballer, born 1969), Portuguese football player and coach
- Jorge Neves (footballer, born 1987), Portuguese football player
- Kévin das Neves (born 1986), French footballer
- Luciano da Rocha Neves (born 1993), Brazilian footballer
- Manny Neves (born 1960), Portuguese-American soccer player
- Marcos Neves (born 1988), Brazilian footballer
- Michel Neves Dias (born 1980), Brazilian footballer
- Nando Maria Neves (born 1978), Cape Verdean footballer
- Pedro das Neves Correia (born 1974), Portuguese footballer
- Pedro Rocha Neves (born 1994), Brazilian footballer
- Ricardo Neves (born 1989), Portuguese footballer
- Rodolfo Xavier Neves (born 1989), Brazilian footballer
- Rúben das Neves (born 1991), Portuguese footballer
- Rúben Neves (born 1997), Portuguese footballer
- Rui Neves (footballer, born 1965), Portuguese footballer
- Rui Neves (footballer, born 1969), Portuguese footballer
- Serafim Neves (1920–1989), Portuguese footballer
- Sérgio André Pereira Neves (born 1993), Portuguese footballer
- Sérgio Ricardo Messias Neves (born 1974), Brazilian Footballer
- Thiago Neves (born 1985), Brazilian footballer
- Vinícius Neves da Silva (born 1982), Brazilian footballer

==== Other sports ====
- Bruno Neves (1981–2008), Portuguese road racing cyclist
- Cláudia das Neves (born 1975), Brazilian women's basketball player
- Hélio Castroneves (born "Hélio Castro Neves", 1975), Brazilian auto racing driver
- Joana Neves (1987–2024), Brazilian Paralympic swimmer
- Mario Neves (basketball) (born 1979) is a Cape Verdean-Portuguese basketball player
- Pedro Miguel Neves (born 1968), Portuguese basketball player
- Ralph Neves (1916–1995), US horse racing jockey

=== Others ===
- Aécio Neves (born 1960), Brazilian economist and politician
- Alda Neves da Graça do Espírito Santo (1926–2010), São Toméan poet, politician, and national anthem lyricist
- Alice Leonor das Neves Costa (born ?), Macanese judge
- André Neves (born 1975). Portuguese mathematician
- António Castanheira Neves (born 1929), Portuguese legal philosopher and professor
- Carlos Augusto R. Santos-Neves (born 1944), Brazilian ambassador to the UK (2008–2010)
- David Neves (1938–1994), Brazilian film director and screenwriter
- Emily Neves (born 1982), US actress, singer, script writer, and voice director
- Graciano dos Santos Neves (1868–1922), Brazilian physician and politician
- Infanta Maria das Neves of Portugal (1852–1941), Portuguese duchess of San Jaime
- José Neves (born 1974), Portuguese billionaire businessman, founder of Farfetch
- José Maria Neves (born 1960), Cape Verdean politician and former Prime Minister
- Lucas Moreira Neves (1925–2002), Brazilian Cardinal Bishop and Prefect of the Congregation for Bishops
- Maria das Neves (born 1958), São Tomé and Príncipe politician and former Prime Minister
- Mario Das Neves (1951–2017), Argentine politician
- Mário Neves (1912–1993), Portuguese journalist and diplomat
- Maurício Neves (born 1979), Brazilian politician
- Oscar Castro-Neves (1940–2013), Brazilian guitarist, arranger, and composer
- Pedro Luís Neves (born 1955), Portuguese composer, musician, and music producer
- Tancredo Neves (1910–1985), Brazilian lawyer, entrepreneur, and president-elect of Brazil (died before taking office)
- Vivien Neves (1947–2002), British glamour model
- Walter Neves (born 1957), Brazilian anthropologist, archaeologist, and biologist
- Wilson das Neves (1936–2017), Brazilian musician (percussionist)

== See also ==
- Nieves, Spanish equivalent
