= Battle of Badajoz (1936) =

Spanish civil war fight

Coordinates: 38°52′N 6°58′W

- Part of Spanish Civil War
Date	August 14, 1936
Location	Badajoz, Extremadura, Spain
Result	Nationalist victory: Massacre of Badajoz

Belligerents
(Spain) Spanish Republic	(Francoist Spain) Nationalist rebels

Commanders and leaders
Col. Ildefonso Puigdendolas	Lt. Col. Juan Yagüe; Lt. Col. Carlos Asensio; Lt. Col. Antonio Castejón

Units involved
3rd Infantry Regiment Castile	Madrid Column

Strength
6,000; 4,000; 2,000 militiamen, 500 soldiers up 2,000 some bombers	3,000 regulars 30 guns at least four bombers

Casualties and losses
750 dead 3,500 wounded, captured or missing	185 casualties: 44 dead, 141 wounded

The Battle of Badajoz was one of the first major engagements of the Spanish Civil War, resulting in a tactical and strategic Nationalist victory, however at a significant cost in time and troops. After several days of shelling and bombardment, Nationalists stormed the fortified border city of Badajoz on August 14, 1936, cutting off the Spanish Republic from neighbouring Portugal and linking the northern and southern zones of Nationalist control (although actual contact with General Emilio Mola's northern troops was not established until September 8).

== Strategic situation ==
Republican (red) and Nationalist (blue) controlled areas, September 1936. Green areas represent the Nationalist territorial gains since the beginning of the war.

The Spanish Civil War had begun on July 18, 1936, after a half-failed coup d'état: the rebels had not managed to take power, but the Republic could not crush them either. This left rebel forces in control of only approximately a third of the country. José Sanjurjo died in a plane crash on the 20th of July, only three days into the war. Emilio Mola had control of the North, while Francisco Franco took care of the Moroccan part. His first move had been to get German and Italian air support to transport almost 10,000 regular troops of the Spanish Army of Africa to southern Spain across the Straits of Gibraltar. German and Italian planes, painted as Spanish, airlifted most of them, and ensured that the Republican Navy did not cross the way of the Nationalist fleet transporting the remaining and the heaviest gear. By August 1, General Franco was able to order a sweep north to link up his forces assembled at Seville with General Mola's distant forces.

Led in the field by Colonel Carlos Asensio and Major Antonio Castejón, the Nationalist Army dashed north in motorized detachments, pausing to bombard and capture walled frontier towns. By August 10, when Lieutenant Colonel Juan Yagüe arrived to take command near Mérida, the Nationalists had secured 300 km of the Portuguese frontier. Mérida fell after a stiff fight on the banks of the Guadiana River, leaving the neighbouring city of Badajoz, now the last remaining Republican outpost on the Portuguese border, isolated from the Republic. Franco personally supervised the operation against Mérida and on the evening of August 10, received Yagüe in his headquarters to discuss the capture of Badajoz and the next objectives. He wanted to knock out the city to unify the two sections of the rebel zone and leave the left flank of the advancing columns covered by the Portuguese border.

== Tactical situation ==
Yagüe marched against Badajoz with 2,250 soldiers of the Spanish Foreign Legion, 750 Moroccan regulares, and five field batteries (total 30 guns), leaving Major Heli Tella behind to hold Mérida.

Inside the ancient fortress-city, large sections of the walls had been demolished some years before the war. The border with Portugal was on the west side of the city. Rebels were coming from the East. The city had been flooded with refugees and the atmosphere in the city was one of doom-laden anticipation. The Nationalists had been successful since the beginning of their advance. Moreover, on August 6, when the Nationalist army approached, a body of Guardia Civil had attempted to defect to the rebels. Colonel Ildefonso Puigdendolas, the leader in charge of the Republican force of about 2,000 - 4,000 or 6,000 militia (depending on the sources), had crushed the revolt, but it had taken its toll of men and morale.

== The battle ==
Before the attack, Badajoz was continuously bombarded by Nationalist artillery and bombers for three days. The rebels, coming from the East, launched their attack on the morning of August 14, after shelling the town again. Colonel Puigdendolas, along with the Mayor and other members of the defence committee, slipped out of the city at about 9:00 am and fled to Portugal.

On the south side of the city, Nationalist units stormed the walls easily. The Moroccan Tetuán regulares pushed through the Puerta de Los Carros (Car Gate), and the Legionnaires and Moroccans swept the Republicans from the barracks. Meanwhile, many soldiers inside the city defected to the rebels, easily allowing the entrance of the attackers into the city.

The only place where the attack encountered difficulties was around Puerta de la Trinidad (Trinity Gate). The defenders' most reliable force, the Carabineros, had been placed there in anticipation of the action. Determined resistance by Republican machine gunners and riflemen checked the assault, shredding several waves of IV Bandera of the Spanish Foreign Legion. Ignoring their losses, the Legionnaires pressed on. A charge led by armoured cars won the gate, and the Nationalists overtook the defenders, pouring through the breach and killing them in hand-to-hand combat. But, the cost was appalling: the attacking 16th Company had lost 76 out of 90 officers and men (other sources cite 20 dead, 22 wounded and 2 missing). All of the unit's officers fell in the attack excepting the captain and one corporal (other sources: two officers dead out of five). Meanwhile, Asensio's men had entered in the city by a breach in the city walls; the storming of the Puerta de la Trinidad was later seen as useless.

Once inside the ramparts the military drove the Republican militia before them, knifing and bayoneting their way toward the city centre, including killing those who had thrown down their weapons and had their hands up. Street fighting raged past nightfall. The Legionnaires later captured 43 wounded milicianos in the military hospital, and afterward, killed them.

== Aftermath ==
The battle contributed several days to the delay which allowed the government to organize its defenses around Madrid.

The fall of Badajoz tore from the Republic the large region of Extremadura, north of Huelva, which was later subdued and swallowed up by the emerging Nationalist state. After the battle, Yagüe turned northeastward toward Madrid and the Tagus River. During his trek, he engaged Republican forces in pitched battles in the weeks that followed.

The Battle of Badajoz followed patterns that continued throughout much of the summer: Republican militia seized the medieval fortresses dotting Castile, yet could not halt nor even slow down the advance of Franco's professional and better equipped troops. The Spanish regular army would prove able to sweep prepared defences held by superior enemy forces, but often suffered heavy losses of its best troops. By year's end, many of the Spanish Foreign Legion lay dead, scattered along a trail of walled towns stretching from Seville to the outskirts of Madrid.

=== Massacre of civilians ===
It has been widely reported that the Nationalists sacked Badajoz and killed thousands of prisoners and civilians, culminating in an infamous round of executions in the town's bull ring, where machine-guns were set up on the barriers around the ring. The screams of the dying could be heard many streets away. Murder and mass rape flared unchecked for several days, and Yagüe's failure to call a halt to the killings earned him the nickname, "The Butcher of Badajoz". Foreign correspondents, depending on their political sympathies, reported between an estimated 1,800 and 4,000 civilian deaths.

There are various eyewitness accounts and other reports of the massacre of Badajoz, including some from foreign correspondents, such as Jay Allen (American), Mário Neves (Portuguese), and Marcel Dany and René Bru (French); there are also photographs that survive of the massacre. Today, most historians recognize that Yagüe killed thousands of militiamen and civilians after the fall of the city and burned the corpses because he did not want to leave enemies, either soldiers or civilians, to the rear of his army. In fact, Yagüe was quoted to have said the following to John T. Whitaker:

"Of course we shot them - he said to me - what do you expect? Was I supposed to take 4,000 reds with me as my column advanced, racing against time? Was I expected to turn them loose in my rear and let them make Badajoz red again?"

The massacre at Badajoz was not a unique case in the march of Yagüe's column from Seville to Badajoz. In every city conquered by Yagüe's men, many civilians were killed. Over six thousand people were killed in the province of Badajoz alone (including the city of Badajoz itself). Most of the victims were journeymen and farmers, and the wholesale massacre of the populace later became known to the world as Franco's White Terror.

== See also ==
- List of Spanish Nationalist military equipment of the Spanish Civil War
- List of Spanish Republican military equipment of the Spanish Civil War
- Badajoz bastioned enclosure
