= Yankovic =

Yankovic is an Anglicized version of the South Slavic surname Janković (Јанковић), or perhaps the Polish surname Jankowicz, derived from the given name Janko. Its bearers can be of different South Slav origins.

Notable people with the surname include:

- "Weird Al" Yankovic (born 1959), American comedy musician
- Frankie Yankovic (1915–1998), American accordionist
- Lily Garafulic Yankovic (1914–2012), Chilean sculptor
- Nieves Yankovic (1916–1985), Chilean actress and documentary maker
