= San Leonardo de Yagüe =

- Municipality
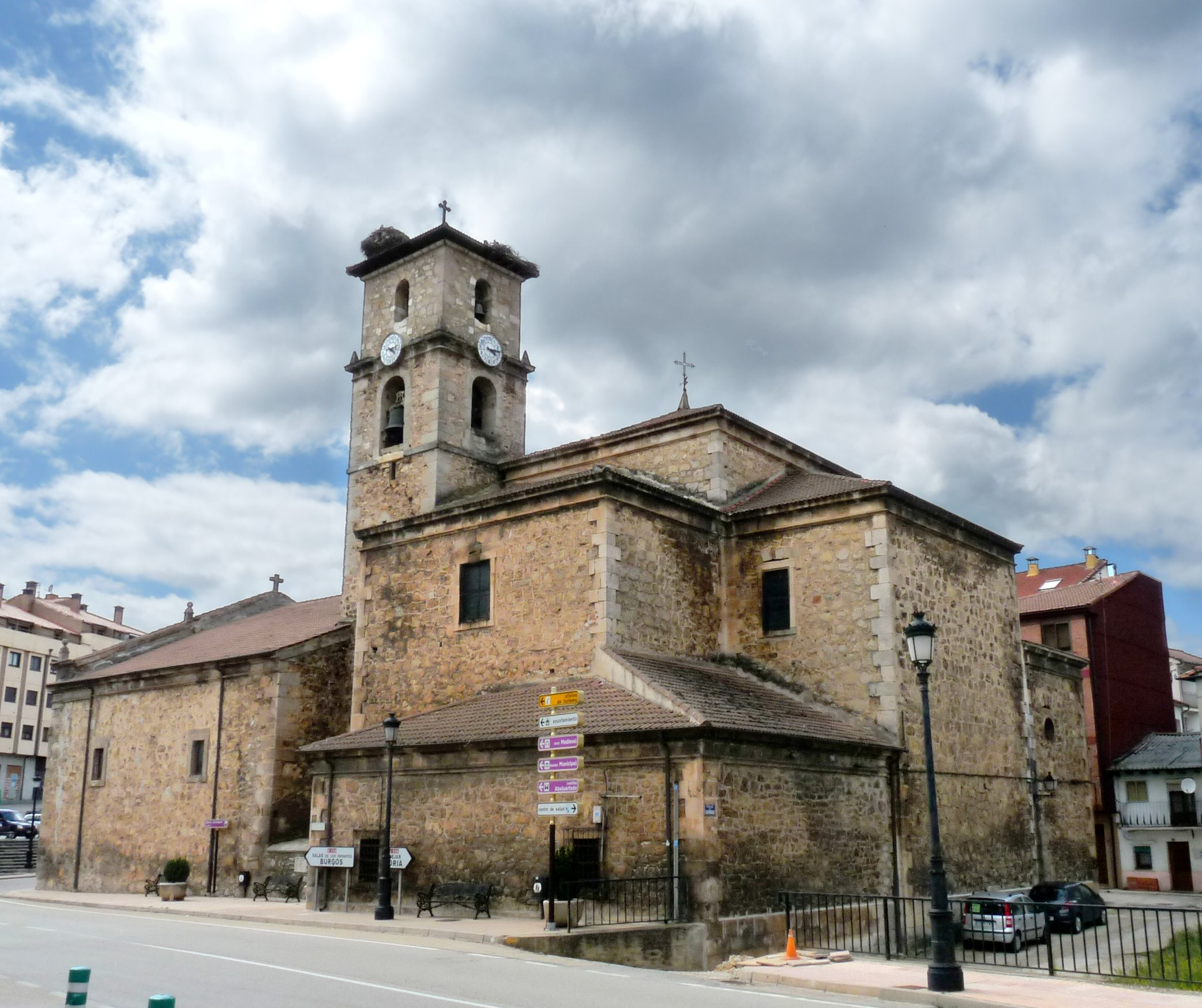

- Flag Coat of arms

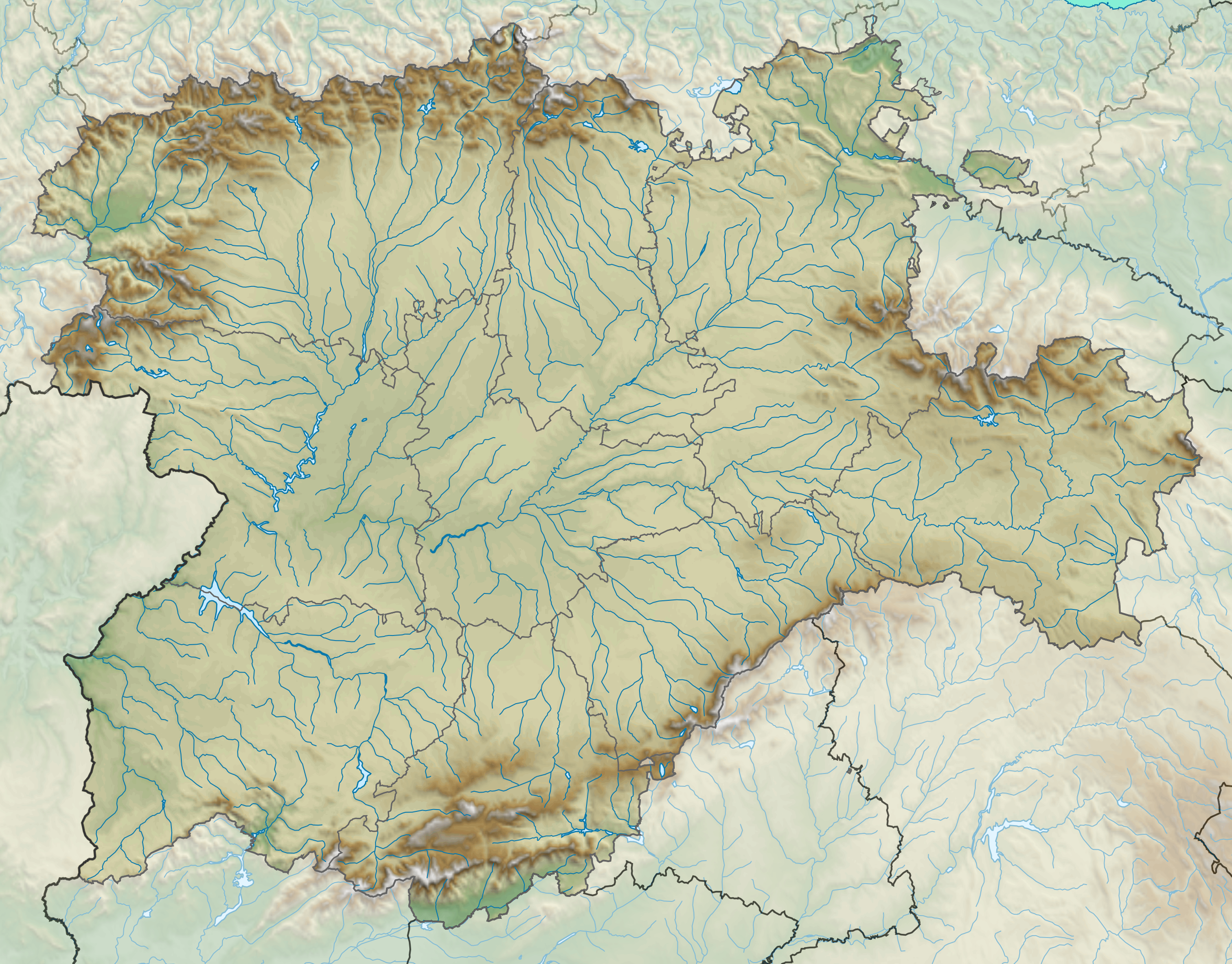
- Location within Spain Location within Castile and León
- Coordinates: 41°49′41″N 3°04′01″W
- Country: Spain
- Autonomous community: Castile and León
- Province: Soria

Government
  - Mayor: Jesús Elvira Martín (People's Party)

Area
  - Total: 60.58 km^{2} (23.39 sq mi)

Population (2023)
  - Total: 1,986
  - Density: 32.78/km^{2} (84.91/sq mi)
- Time zone: UTC+1 (CET)
  - Summer (DST): UTC+2 (CEST)
- Website: Official website

San Leonardo de Yagüe is a Spanish town and municipality located in the province of Soria, in the autonomous community of Castile and León. It is one of the most populated municipalities of the Sorian county of Pinares.

It has primary and secondary schools (I.E.S. San Leonardo), attended by students from surrounding municipalities (Navaleno, Hontoria del Pinar, Casarejos, Espeja, Espejón, La Hinojosa, and others).

The town, which has about 2,000 inhabitants, is home to the Puertas Norma timber products factory, a manufacturer of doors and pre-hung door units. The factory is the main labor center and the factory employed about 600 workers until 2012, when they dismissed or temporarily suspended a majority of their employees.

== History ==
The foundation date of the village is unknown, but it is supposed to be in the 10th or 11th century. The oldest document where the village is mentioned is from 1173, in a privilege card given by Alfonso VIII.

The village is the birthplace of Juan Yagüe in 1891. Yagüe, a general in Franco's army, became notorious for instigating the massacre at Badajoz in 1936. The village was renamed after Yagüe following his death in 1952, becoming San Leonardo de Yagüe.
