= Rui Neves =

Rui Neves may refer to:

- Rui Neves (footballer, born 1965), Portuguese football player, forward
- Rui Neves (footballer, born 1969), Portuguese football player, defender
