= Nieves =

- Language: Spanish

Origin
- Language: Asturleonese
- Derivation: Our Lady of the Snows
- Meaning: snow
- Region of origin: Spain

Other names
- Cognate: Neves (Portuguese)

Nieves, the Spanish plural form of nieve (English: snow), is a matronymic surname and female given name derived from the title of the Virgin Mary Nuestra Señora de las Nieves (Our Lady of the Snows), a reference to the 4th-century Catholic miracle of a summertime snowfall on the Esquiline Hill in Rome, where the Basilica Sanctae Mariae ad Nives was built. Descended from the Asturleonese language in northwestern Spain, the surname is most common in the Hispanosphere. In Spain, it is most prevalent in Andalusia, Madrid, Canary Islands, and Galicia. In Hispanic America, it is most prevalent in Mexico, Venezuela, Colombia, and particularly Puerto Rico, where it is most densely concentrated. It has also been introduced into the United States.

The Portuguese cognate of Nieves is Neves, and it is most common in Brazil. A similar but unrelated toponymic surname can also be found in Scotland, originating from the historic parish of Nevay in Angus.

== Notable people with the given name Nieves ==
- Nieves Anula (born 1973), Spanish basketball player
- Nieves Confesor, Filipino politician
- Nieves Herrero (born 1957), Spanish journalist, presenter, and writer
- Nieves Hidalgo (born 1976), Spanish singer
- Nieves Mathews (1917–2003), author of Scottish and Spanish parentage
- Nieves Barragán Mohacho, Spanish chef
- Nieves Navarro (born 1938), Spanish-born Italian actress and fashion model
- Nieves Panadell (born 1956), Spanish swimmer
- Nieves Yankovic (1916–1985), Chilean actress and documentary maker
- Nieves Zuberbühler (born 1987), Argentine journalist

== Notable people with the surname Nieves ==
- Antonio Nieves, American professional boxer
- Brian Nieves, American politician
- Christian Nieves, Puerto Rican cuatro player
- Christine Nieves, Puerto Rican climate activist
- Daniela Nieves Venezuelan-American actress
- Javi Nieves, Spanish radio host
- José Alvarado Nieves, Mexican wrestler
- José Antonio Nieves Conde, Spanish film director and screenplay writer
- José Miguel Nieves, retired Venezuelan baseball player
- Juan Nieves, retired Puerto Rican baseball player
- Lisette Nieves, Puerto Rican-American businesswoman
- Luis López Nieves, Puerto Rican author
- Maikel Nieves, Spanish footballer for Norwegian club Råde
- María Nieves, Argentine tango dancer and choreographer
- María Antonieta de las Nieves, Mexican actress
- Melvin Nieves, retired Puerto Rican baseball player
- Nelson Nieves, Venezuelan fencer
- Néstor Nieves, Venezuelan long-distance runner
- Osvaldo Nieves, Puerto Rican track and field athlete
- Roberto González Nieves, Puerto Rican church leader
- Tito Nieves, Puerto Rican singer
- Wil Nieves, Puerto Rican baseball player

== See also ==
- As Neves (Spanish Nieves), a municipality in Galicia, Spain in the province of Pontevedra
- Las Nieves, Agusan del Norte, a municipality in the Philippines
- Nieva (Spanish group), a rock/electronica band
- Nevis, a Caribbean island with the same etymology
- Blancanieves (Snow White)
- Nieves v. Bartlett a US Supreme Court case
