= Juan Yagüe =

Spanish Nationalist general nicknamed "Butcher of Badajoz"

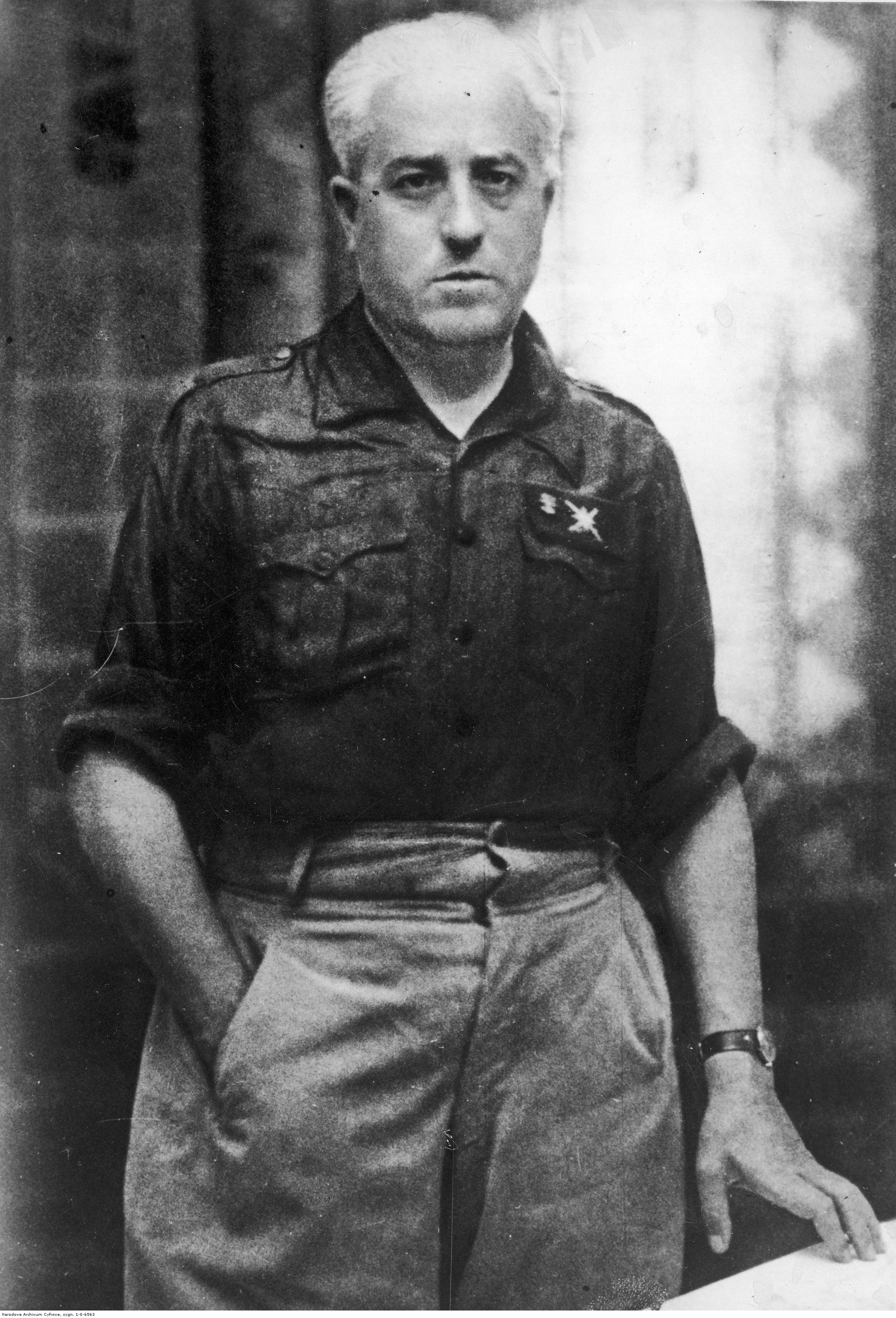
- Born: Juan Yagüe y Blanco; 9 November 1891; San Leonardo, Kingdom of Spain
- Died: 21 October 1952 (aged 60); Burgos, Francoist Spain
- Military career
- Allegiance: Kingdom of Spain (1907–1931); Spanish Republic (1931–1936); Francoist Spain (1936–1952)
- Branch: Spanish Army; Spanish Legion
- Service years: 1907–1952
- Rank: Captain General
- Nickname: Butcher of Badajoz
- Commands: Military Commander of Melilla; Captain General of the VI Military Region
- Conflicts: Rif War; Asturian Revolution of 1934; Spanish Civil War; Invasion of Val d'Aran
- Awards: Military Medal

Minister of the Air of Spain
- In office 9 August 1939 – 27 June 1940
- Caudillo: Francisco Franco
- Prime Minister: Francisco Franco
- Preceded by: Position created
- Succeeded by: Juan Vigón

Juan Yagüe y Blanco, 1st Marquis of San Leonardo de Yagüe (9 November 1891 – 21 October 1952) was a Spanish military officer during the Spanish Civil War, one of the most important in the Nationalist side. He became known as the "Butcher of Badajoz" (Carnicero de Badajoz) because he ordered thousands killed, including wounded Republican soldiers in the hospital.

== Early life ==
The son of a doctor, he was born in the village of San Leonardo in Soria. The village was eventually renamed San Leonardo de Yagüe by Franco in his honor. He enrolled at a young age in the Toledo Infantry Academy, where Francisco Franco was a fellow cadet. The two men received their commissions concurrently and served together in Africa, where Yagüe was wounded on several occasions and received several decorations.

Yagüe was promoted to lieutenant colonel in 1932. He, along with Franco and General Eduardo López Ochoa, helped suppress a workers uprising in Asturias using Moroccan Regulars and Legionnaires in 1934. He was an early supporter of the Falange Española and a close personal friend of José Antonio Primo de Rivera.

== Spanish Civil War ==
When Niceto Alcalá-Zamora was replaced as President of the Republic by the left-wing Manuel Azaña on 10 May 1936, a group of Spanish Army officers, including Yagüe, Emilio Mola, Franco, Gonzalo Queipo de Llano and José Sanjurjo, started plotting to overthrow the democratically elected Popular Front government. When Mola was transferred from Morocco to Pamplona in March 1936, he placed Yagüe (who was at the time head of the Legion in Ceuta) in command of the conspiracy in Morocco. This led to a military uprising which precipitated the Spanish Civil War on 17 July 1936.

Yagüe, who knew Franco from their time together in Africa, actively campaigned to have Franco recognized as head of the Nationalist rising.

Yagüe's forces revolted in Ceuta before crossing the Straits of Gibraltar to link up with Nationalist forces in Seville, led by Queipo de Llano. Yagüe advanced northward, first seizing Mérida before attacking Badajoz with 3,000 troops on 14 August 1936. Bitter street fighting took place when the Nationalists advanced into the city. Yagüe's forces eventually gained control of Badajoz, with both sides suffering heavy casualties.

Under Yagüe's direction, hundreds of prisoners, military and civilians, were killed or executed in Badajoz during the Badajoz massacre.

Before leaving the city, Yagüe was asked by the American journalist John T. Whitaker about his reason for killing 10% of the city's population and he answered:

"Of course we shot them", he said to me. "What do you expect? Was I supposed to take 4,000 reds with me as my column advanced, racing against time? Was I expected to turn them loose in my rear and let them make Badajoz red again?"

— Juan Yagüe to John T. Whitaker

Yagüe was then promoted to colonel and afterwards advanced on Madrid, capturing Trujillo, Navalmoral de la Mata and Talavera de la Reina, but was unable to take the capital. He took part in the Aragon Offensive and seized control of Belchite, Caspe and Lérida. He also played a leading role in the Nationalist victory at the Ebro.

A year on from the Unification Decree, Yagüe noted his disenchantment with the war and its conduct, which he felt was politically calculated and overly cruel. In May 1938, he was removed from his command and imprisoned for injudicious remarks he made in a speech at Burgos, critical of Franco. He was back at the front within weeks. It was reportedly said that he was the only commander of Spanish forces that the Condor Legion respected. Yagüe never showed panic even when the enemy was close by, and was able to adjust battle plans quickly to suit changing circumstances.

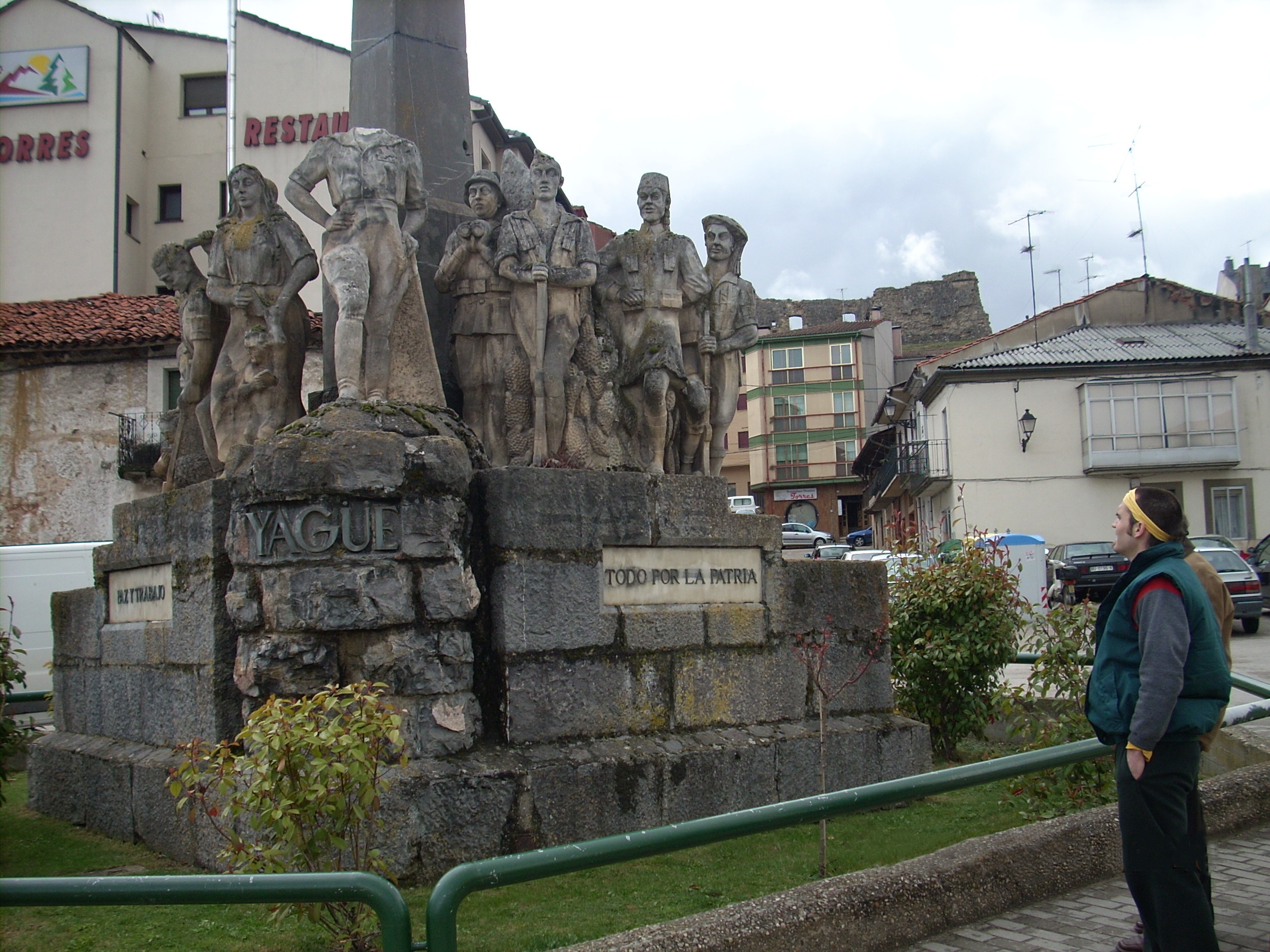
Monument to Juan Yagüe

== Post-war ==
After the collapse of the Second Spanish Republic in 1939, Yagüe was promoted to major-general and appointed as Minister of the Air Force by General Franco. He was made a lieutenant general in 1942 and was posthumously promoted to commander-in-chief. He died of lung cancer in 1952.

Government offices
New creation	Air Minister; 1939 – 1940	Succeeded by Juan Vigón
Spanish nobility
New creation	Marquis of San Leonardo de Yagüe (posthumous); 1953	Succeeded by Juan Yagüe Martínez del Campo
