= Herbert Southworth =

Herbert Rutledge Southworth (February 6, 1908 – October 30, 1999) was a writer, journalist and historian specializing in the Spanish Civil War and the subsequent Francoist State in Spain and whose work led the Francoist ministry of information to set up an entire department to counter his demolition of the State's propaganda. He also founded a radio station in Tangier following the end of World War II.

== Early life ==
Southworth was born in Canton, Oklahoma. He worked as a construction worker and in a copper mine in Arizona. There, he learned Spanish from the Mexican workers. At Texas Technological College (now Texas Tech University) in Lubbock, Texas, he majored in history, with a minor in Spanish. In 1934, he started work in the document department at the US Library of Congress in Washington.

== Spanish Civil War ==
When the Spanish civil war broke out, Southworth reviewed books on the conflict for the Washington Post. His articles brought him to the notice of the Spanish republic's ambassador, who asked him to work for the Spanish information bureau.

He also took a master's degree at Columbia University and formed an enduring friendship with the war correspondent Jay Allen.

Southworth was devastated by the defeat of the Spanish republic and he and Allen continued to work for the exiled premier Juan Negrín.

== World War II ==
Shortly after the Japanese attack on Pearl Harbor, Southworth was recruited by the US office of war information. In 1943, he was sent to Algeria to work for the office of psychological warfare, and later was posted to Morocco to broadcast to Franco's Spain.

== Post-war radio broadcasting ==
In the aftermath of World War II, Southworth continued his radio broadcasting activities, starting his own shortwave station, Radio Tangier Internationale, in the Tangier International Zone. In addition to commentaries on the political situation in the surrounding region, such as Morocco and Algeria, as well as Franco Spain, the station also carried religious broadcasts such as The World Tomorrow and the Baltimore Gospel Tabernacle. Following the dissolution of the Tangier International Zone and its subsequent Moroccan administration, the station was nationalized in 1960.

== Historiography of Francoist propaganda ==
Southworth wrote a series of books which obliged the Francoist State to change its falsified version of its own past. The most celebrated was an exposé of rightwing propaganda, The Myth of Franco's Crusade, which was published in Spanish and French by José Martínez, of Ruedo Ibérico, the leading anti-Franco exiled publishing house based in Paris. Sold clandestinely in Spain, its impact obliged the then information minister, Manuel Fraga, to set up a department dedicated to modernising the State's historiography. Its director, Ricardo de la Cierva, later Spain's minister of culture (1980-1981), went on to write 80 books in defence of Francoist Spain.

In 1965, Southworth wrote a second book, Antifalange, on how Franco converted the Falange into the single party of his State.

Guernica! Guernica! A Study of Journalism, Diplomacy, Propaganda and History (1977) deals with the effort by Franco's propagandists and admirers to wipe out the atrocity at Guernica. Two years before its publication, and on the advice of the French historian, Pierre Vilar, the manuscript had been successfully presented by Southworth as his doctoral thesis at the Sorbonne.

In the mid-1970s, Southworth became Regents Professor at the University of California.

A pugnacious polemicist, he regularly took part in literary arguments, most notably with Burnett Bolloten and Hugh Thomas.

In 1970, he sold his collection of documents to the University of California.

He had once told Paul Preston that he would like the epitaph on his gravestone to read, "His writings were not Holy Writ, but neither were they wholly shit." Only three days before his death, he delivered what Preston describes as a more fitting epitaph: the manuscript of Conspiracy and the Spanish Civil War: The Brainwashing of Francisco Franco, published by Routledge. He died on 30 October 1999 in a medical centre of Le Blanc, close to Saint-Benoît-du-Sault (Indre), the French village where Southworth had lived his last two decades.

== Bibliography ==
- — (2002). Conspiracy and the Spanish Civil War: The Brainwashing of Francisco Franco. Routledge. ISBN 041522781X.
- — (1 January 1977). Guernica! Guernica!: A Study of Journalism, Diplomacy, Propaganda, and History. University of California Press. ISBN 0520028309.
- Preston, Paul. (2009) We saw Spain die. Foreign correspondents in the Spanish Civil War. Constable. London. ISBN 978-1-84529-946-0
