= Cristiano Neves =

Brazilian footballer (born 1981)

Personal information
- Full name: Cristiano dos Santos Neves
- Date of birth: 25 October 1981 (age 45)
- Place of birth: Rosário do Catete, Brazil
- Height: 1.80 m (5 ft 11 in)
- Position: Forward

Team information
- Current team: Morrinhos

Youth career
- 2000: São Cristóvão

Senior career*
Years	Team	Apps	(Gls)
2001	São Cristóvão		
2002	Corinthians-AL		
2002	Ceará		
2003	Uniclinic		
2003	Confiança		
2004	Itabaiana		
2005–2010	J. Malucelli		
2006–2007	→ Paraná (Loan)	28	(11)
2007	→ Palmeiras (Loan)	3	(0)
2007	→ Goiás (Loan)	14	(1)
2008	→ Bahia (Loan)		
2008–2009	→ Paraná (Loan)		
2011	Marcílio Dias		
2012	Ypiranga-PE		
2013–	Morrinhos		
- * Club domestic league appearances and goals

Cristiano dos Santos Neves (born 25 October 1981), sometimes known as just Cristiano, is a Brazilian professional footballer who plays as a forward for Morrinhos.
