= Badajoz massacre =

1936 Spanish Civil War incident

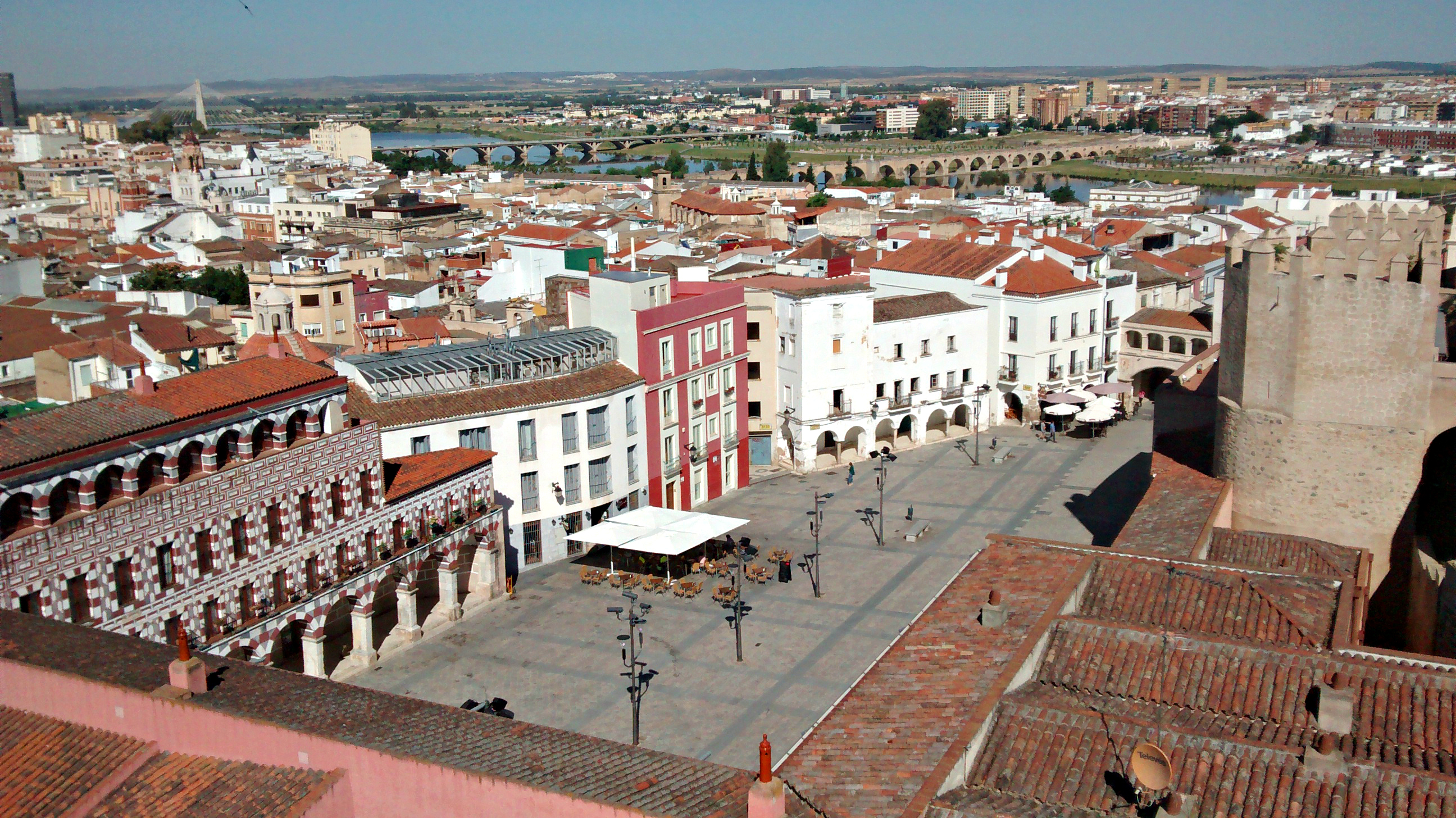
- View of the old centre of the city of Badajoz, next to the river Guadiana, where the massacre took place after the Battle of Badajoz.
- Location: Badajoz, Spain
- Date: August 1936
- Target: Republican soldiers and civilians
- Attack type: Shooting
- Deaths: 3,000-4,000
- Perpetrator: Nationalist troops

The Badajoz massacre occurred in the days after the Battle of Badajoz during the Spanish Civil War. Between 500 and 4,000 civilian and military supporters of the Second Spanish Republic were murdered by the Nationalist forces after the seizure of the town of Badajoz on August 14, 1936.

== Background ==
The situation in Extremadura had been extremely tense for several months before the civil war commenced on July 18, 1936. The Republican government had passed the Agrarian Reform Law, which gave peasant farmers, who were more than 50% of the active population, the right to become owners of the land that they worked. This resulted in major confrontations between the farmers and the region's major landowners. In March 1936, labourers in the Badajoz region attempted to accelerate the implementation of the law by invading and occupying the farmlands in question.

In the aftermath of the Nationalist military rebellion, several bloody events in the region were perpetrated by Republicans, which were described as the "Republican repression" or the Spanish Red Terror. Queipo de Llano and Juan Yagüe would later justify the massacre at Badajoz as punishment for the Republican massacre of Nationalist supporters.

After the outbreak of war, on the night of July 18–19 in Fuente de Cantos, 56 people were forced into a church, which was then set ablaze from outside. Twelve victims died, with eight of them burned. On August 17 in Almendralejo, 28 Nationalist supporters, who had been held in prison, were executed. Eleven Nationalist supporters were executed in Badajoz itself. In all, some 243 people were executed in the west of the Province of Badajoz by Republican forces.

The Nationalists committed atrocities on Republican supporters during the advance of General Yagüe's column on Badajoz from Seville. In every city taken by Yagüe's troops, dozens to thousands of people were killed.

After the occupation of Fuente de Cantos by Yagüe's column, some 325 Republicans were executed. Another 403 Republicans were executed after the fall of Almendralejo. Between 6,610 and 12,000 persons were killed by Nationalist forces in the western part of the Province of Badajoz, including the city of Badajoz itself. Most of the victims were journeymen and farmers. The massacres were part of the Spanish "White Terror".

== Taking of Badajoz ==
The occupation of Badajoz occurred during the advance of the Nationalist Army from Andalucía to the north of the Iberian Peninsula. The assault on the city was vital for the Nationalists, as it would mean the joining of the Army of the South with that of Emilio Mola, which dominated the north.

Badajoz found itself isolated after the fall of Mérida several days earlier. The siege of the town was carried out by 2,250 Spanish legionarios, 750 Moroccan Regulares and five batteries of artillery under the command of Lieutenant Colonel Juan Yagüe.

The final assault was made on the evening of August 14, after the city had been bombarded from both land and air (by German Junkers Ju 52) for most of the day. Badajoz's recently reoccupied 18th-century walls were defended by 2,000 Republican militiamen and 500 regular soldiers, led by Colonel Ildefonso Puigdendolas.

After opening a breach in the walls to the east, at the Puerte de la Trinidad and Puerte de Carros, the Nationalist troops entered the city. After bloody hand-to-hand fighting, Badajoz fell to the Nationalists.

== Accounts ==
The same day, Yagüe ordered the confinement of all prisoners, most of them civilians, in the town's Bull Ring (Plaza de Toros), and he began executions there that night. According to articles published in Le Populaire, Le Temps, Le Figaro, Paris-Soir, Diário de Lisboa and the Chicago Tribune mass executions took place, and the streets of Badajoz became littered with bodies. The American journalist Jay Allen, in his report in the Chicago Tribune, spoke of 1,800 men and women killed on the first night alone.

On August 15, a reporter for Le Temps, Jacques Berthet, sent the following report:

...around 200 people have been shot by firing squad, we have seen the sidewalks of the Comandancia Militar soaked in blood.... The arrests and mass executions continue in the Bull Ring. The streets are swept by bullets, covered in glass, tiles and abandoned bodies. In the calle San Juan alone there are 300 corpses.

On August 18, Le Populaire published:

Elvas. August 17. Mass executions have been taking place all yesterday evening and all of this morning in Badajoz. It is estimated that the number of people executed is more than 1,500. Among the notable victims are a number of officers who defended the city against the entrance of the rebels: Colonel Cantero, commandant Alonso, captain Almendro, Lieutenant Vega and a number of NCOs and soldiers. At the same time, dozens of civilians have been shot around the bull ring.

Also on August 18, François Mauriac published an article about the events in Badajoz in Le Figaro.

The Portuguese journalist Mário Neves, who had witnessed the massacre at first hand, had his report to Diário de Lisboa censored by the government of António de Oliveira Salazar, who was an ally of the Spanish Nationalists. Neves returned to Portugal, was horrified by what he had witnessed and swore that he would never return to Badajoz. He finally returned there in 1982 to retrace his steps in the places in which the events had happened for a television documentary.

=== Mass executions ===
Military personnel who had participated in the defense of the city or anyone else suspected to sympathise with the Republic were rounded up by Legionarios, Moroccan Regulares, officers of the Guardia Civil or local members of the fascist Falange Party and taken to the Bull Ring in groups. According to the testimony of survivors, the executions were carried out in groups, either by firing squad or machine-gunning, and the bodies were then taken by truck to the old San Juan Cemetery, where they were burned and then deposited in mass graves.

One employee of the city council, interviewed by Francisco Pilo Ortiz, recalled:

The Guardia Civil came looking for us at three in the morning of the August 15, "because there was work to be done".... One of them said he would get the truck from the yard and that we had to go to the bull ring.... At half past three we arrived. Inside the ring, on the left there were many dead laid out in a line, and they told us to load them into the truck and take them to the cemetery.... [when they returned from the cemetery] There were more dead bodies, but not all together, a pile here, another over there. Then I realised that they were taking them out in batches and shooting them. That day, we made at least seven trips [from the bull ring to the cemetery]

There were also firing squads in other areas of the city. Among those executed were men and women who supported the Republic, workers, peasants, soldiers who took part in the battle, local authorities and those who were merely suspected of belonging to one of those categories.

After the fall of the city, Mayor Sinforiano Madroñero and his deputy, Nicolás de Pablo, both Socialists, crossed the border into Portugal, but they were tracked down by agents of the Portuguese regime and handed over to the Nationalist troops, who executed them without trial in Badajoz on August 20.

Afterwards, a testimony was published in La Voz (October 20, 1936), in the Republican-controlled Madrid, that the executions in the Bull Ring had been like a party for the executioners, with a crowd present, and that some of the victims had even been killed in the manner of bullfight (stuck in the back with bandillero lances) and mutilated. That has never been verified although there is some evidence that sadism was indulged during the massacre.

After learning of the events, Nationalist propaganda published various other versions of events to try to hide the massacre, and several foreign correspondents were threatened or discredited in the press.

== Aftermath ==
The massacre of Badajoz was of great significance in the development of the war. In late August, as the Basque towns of Irun and Fuenterrabia were being shelled from the sea and bombed from the air, the rebels dropped pamphlets threatening to deal with the population as they had "dealt with" the people of Badajoz. In consequence, panic-stricken refugees headed for France. The publication in the foreign press of the events meant that Franco ordered that such massacres were to cease, as they harmed the Nationalists' image. On the other side, Republican propaganda publicised the massacre enormously and used it to justify their atrocities, such as the Paracuellos massacre of November 1936.

Arising from the events in Badajoz, the German officer Hans von Funck, one of the few high-ranking German soldiers present with the Nationalist Army of the South, sent a report to Berlin advising against the deployment of regular German troops in Spain. He wrote that he was

a soldier used to combat, who has fought in France during World War I, but he has never seen such brutality and ferocity as that with which the African Expeditionary Force carried out their operations. For this reason he advised against sending German regulars to Spain, because before such savagery, the German soldiers would become demoralised.

== Estimates of death toll ==
The massacre is one of the most controversial events of the war, and estimates of the number of victims vary significantly depending on the historian doing the research. In addition, since the Nationalist side won the war, there was never an official investigation into what happened to Republicans in the city after its fall. Most estimates suggest that between 2,000 and 4,000 people were executed. An investigation by the historian Francisco Espinosa has established a list of 1,341 names of victims of the Nationalists in the city of Badajoz, but he said that was only a partial figure and that the true death toll may be higher.

Several human rights associations have categorised the events in Badajoz as crimes against humanity. or even genocide. As of 2007, there were several complaints to that effect under consideration.

The troops who committed the killings at Badajoz were under the command of Yagüe, who after the war was appointed Ministry of the Air by Franco. For the actions of his troops at Badajoz, Yagüe was popularly known as the butcher of Badajoz. According to a census, Badajoz had 41,122 inhabitants in 1930 and so if the correct figure was 4,000 executed, the percentage of retaliation would have reached 10% of the population.

The Nationalists tried to conceal the massacre, but some journalists (Mário Neves, Rene Brut, Daniel Berthet, Marcel Dany and Jay Allen) entered Badajoz after the seizure of the town and discovered the executions. Furthermore, Yagüe himself boasted to the American correspondent John T. Whitaker:

"Of course we shot them", he said to me. "What do you expect? Was I supposed to take 4,000 reds with me as my column advanced, racing against time? Was I expected to turn them loose in my rear and let them make Badajoz red again?"

— Juan Yagüe to John T. Whitaker

However, lower figures have also been suggested. A 2010 study put the death toll at between 500 and 700.
