= Serginho (footballer, born 1993) =

Portuguese footballer

Personal information
- Full name: Sérgio André Pereira Neves
- Date of birth: 6 July 1993 (age 33)
- Place of birth: Águas Santas, Portugal
- Height: 1.85 m (6 ft 1 in)
- Position: Centre-back

Team information
- Current team: Gondomar

Youth career
- 2003–2009: Pedrouços
- 2009–2011: Candal
- 2011–2012: Leixões

Senior career*
Years	Team	Apps	(Gls)
2012–2013	Leça	28	(4)
2013–2015	Bragança	29	(2)
2014	→ Belenenses (loan)	0	(0)
2015	→ Académico Viseu (loan)	3	(0)
2015–2016	Vitória Guimarães B	6	(0)
2016–2018	Bragança	61	(9)
2018	Felgueiras 1932	0	(0)
2018–2020	Sintrense	26	(2)
2020–	Gondomar	0	(0)
- * Club domestic league appearances and goals as of 1 August 2021

Sérgio André Pereira Neves (born 6 July 1993 in Águas Santas), known as Serginho, is a Portuguese footballer who plays as a central defender for Gondomar.
