= Jay Allen =

American journalist (1900–1972)

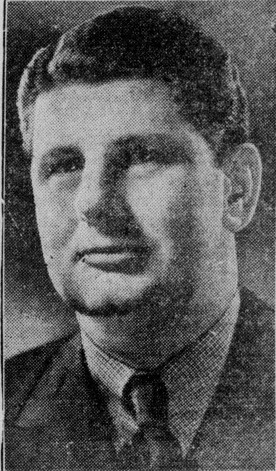
- Born: Jay Cooke Allen; 7 July 1900; Seattle, Washington
- Died: 20 December 1972 (aged 72); Carmel-by-the-Sea, California
- Occupations: journalist, war correspondent

Jay Cooke Allen Jr. (Seattle, 7 July 1900 – Carmel, 20 December 1972) was an American journalist. He worked mostly for the Chicago Tribune, though his contributions appeared also in many other US newspapers, especially between the mid-1920s and the mid-1930s. He is known mostly as a foreign correspondent active during the Spanish Civil War; his interview with Francisco Franco, report from Badajoz and interview with José Antonio Primo de Rivera are at times considered 3 most important journalistic accounts of the conflict and made enormous impact around the globe. His work as war correspondent is extremely controversial: some consider him a model of impartial, investigative journalism, and some think his work an exemplary case of ideologically motivated manipulation and fake news.

== Early career (before 1936) ==
=== Infancy and youth ===
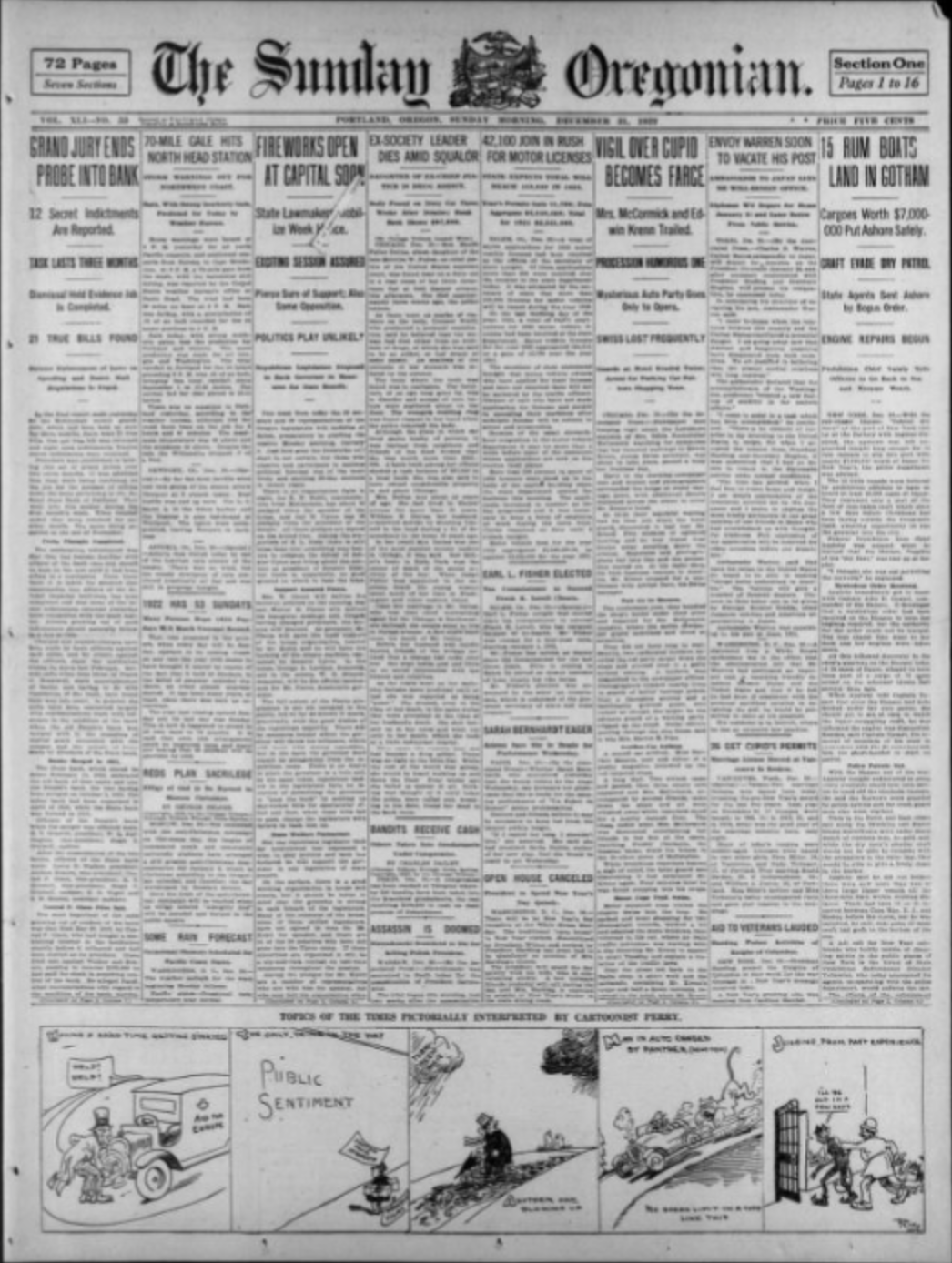
Oregonian, 1922

His father Jay Cooke Allen (1868–1948) was born in Kentucky but he settled in Seattle and practiced as an attorney; his mother Jeanne Maud Lynch (1876–1901) was a first generation Irish-American. She died due to tuberculosis when Jay was 15-months old. The religion-motivated legal battle for custody over Jay ensued between Jeanne's Catholic relatives and the Methodist father, who eventually emerged victorious. Some authors speculate that the episode might have influenced later Allen's hostility towards the Catholic Church. However, Allen's juvenile relations with his father were also tense, since Jay Allen Sr. became a violent alcohol addict. Jay left home in his early teens and moved to the East Coast, where he became the boarder at the Pullman College in Washington. After graduation Jay Allen Jr. entered an unidentified faculty at the Harvard, where he received his master's degree in 1920. Afterwards in the early 1920s he was employed by The Portland Oregonian.

=== In Paris ===
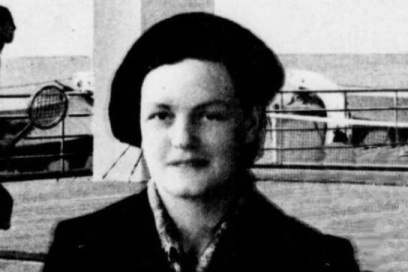
Ruth Myrtle Allen

In 1924 Allen married Ruth Myrtle Austin (1899–1990), a woman from Woodburn in Oregon; on their honeymoon the couple went to France. When in Paris they befriended Ernest Hemingway, who tipped Allen off that he was about to resign his job with the Paris office of the Chicago Daily Tribune. Allen immediately applied for the vacancy and was successful. In 1925 he joined the paper's foreign service; Allen's first signed correspondence in Tribune is dated February 19, 1926. His only son Jay Cooke Michael (later an Episcopal priest and dean of the Berkeley Divinity School) was born in Paris in 1927. Between 1924 and 1934 Allen remained formally based in France though he spent long spells abroad, especially in Geneva, where he reported from the League of Nations. At the time he covered events in France, Belgium, Spain, Italy, Austria, Germany, Poland and the Balkans. As foreign correspondent Allen travelled extensively across Europe and went as far as to the Polish-Lithuanian border.

=== In Spain ===
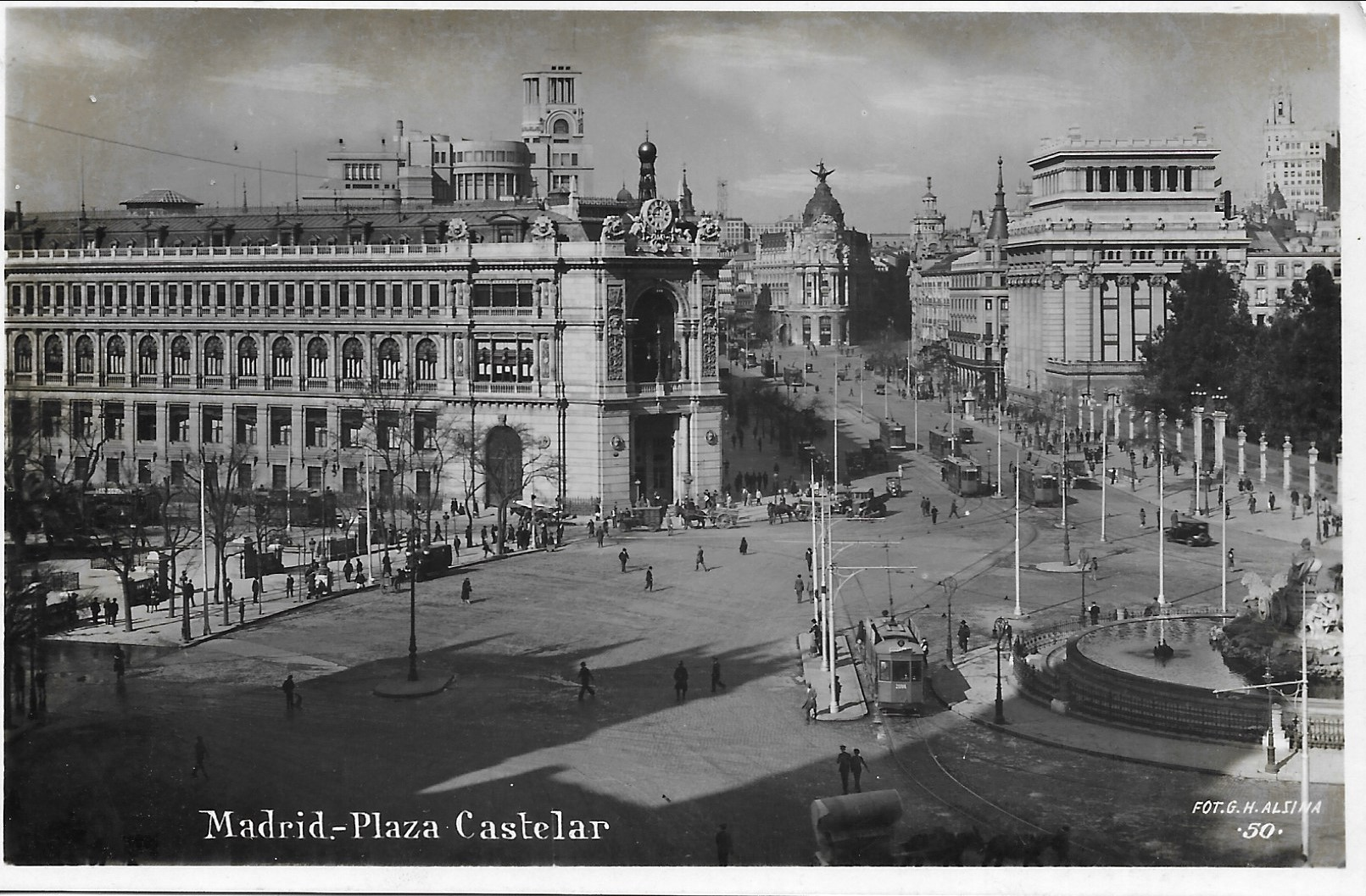
Madrid, 1932

Allen's job took him to Spain a few times in the late 1920s; he briefly resided in Madrid in 1930. The Allens became close friends to an aristocrat turned radical socialist Constancia de la Mora, who in turn introduced them to numerous left-wing activists. He settled in Madrid again in early 1934, this time with the intention to go on as a journalist but also to study the agrarian question. Allen resumed his personal contacts with radical left-wing journalists, intellectuals, artists and politicians. He forged friendship with Juan Negrín, Luis Araquistáin, Julio Álvarez del Vayo, Rodolfo Llopis, Luis Quintanilla and many others. Following the Asturian revolution he hosted in his apartment Amador Fernández, the leader of Asturian miners who went into hiding. In his correspondence to American press he remained highly sympathetic towards the revolutionaries; at one point he was arrested and interrogated by the police, but was soon set free. In the mid-1930s Allen settled in Torremolinos, in a hotel owned by a British friend.

== Spanish Civil War (1936–1937) ==
=== Interview with Franco ===
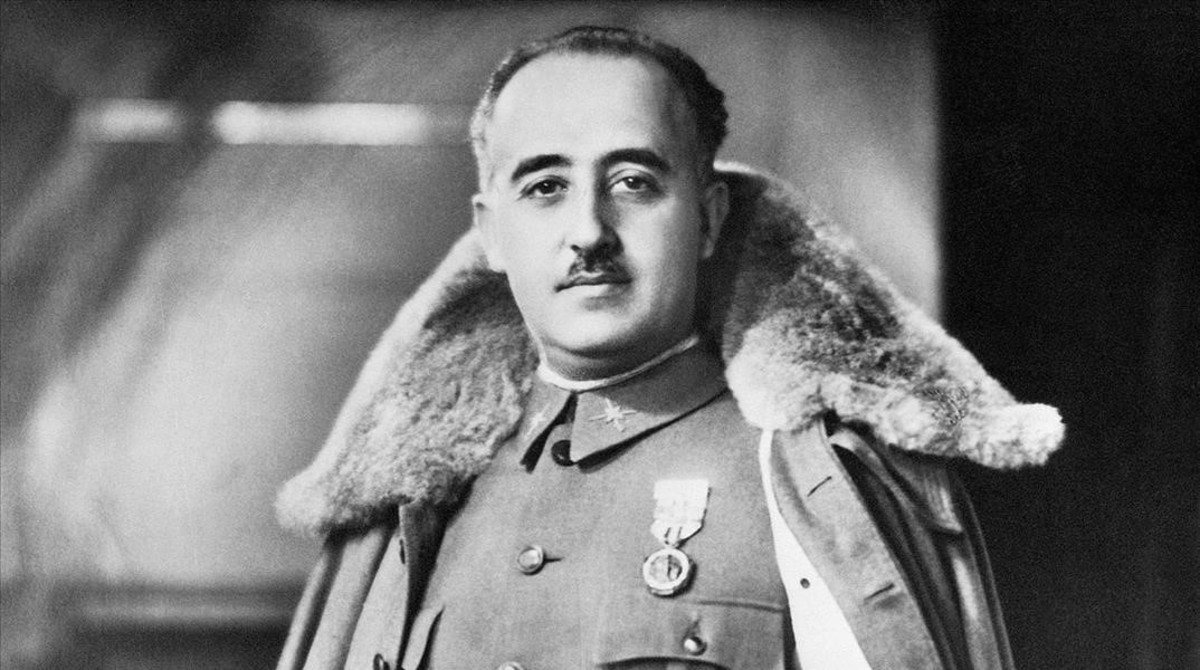
Franco, around 1936

Following the news of the July Coup Allen immediately left Torremolinos and fled to Gibraltar; en route his car was mistakenly fired at – according to his own account – by "very nervous squad of Republican soldiers", who killed the driver. In late July he shuttled between Gibraltar and the Spanish Morocco. As American press correspondent he gained access to the entourage of Francisco Franco and managed to secure what is often erroneously referred to as the first interview with the general after the coup. The conversation took place on July 27 in Tetuán, and the interview appeared in News Chronicle of July 29, 1936. Allen presented Franco in rather unsympathetic though prophetic terms as an excessively self-confident "midget who would be a dictator", the person consumed by anti-Masonic and anti-Marxist obsession. According to Allen when asked whether he was ready to "shoot half Spain", Franco confirmed that he was prepared to save the country from Marxism "at whatever cost". This statement was also emphasized in the sub-title.

=== Badajoz ===
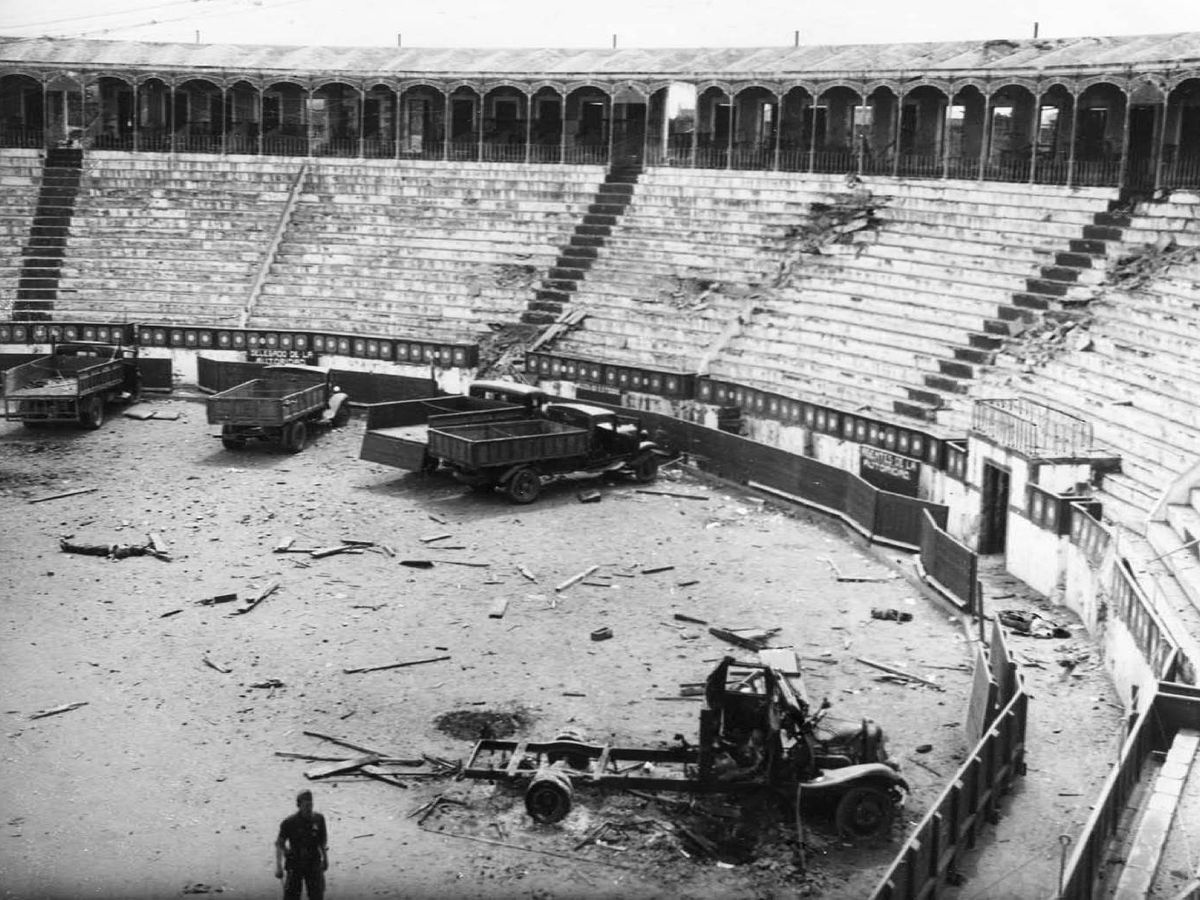
Badajoz bull-ring, August 1936

Allen's whereabouts between late July and mid-August are not clear, though he probably shuttled between Gibraltar, Spanish Morocco and the international zone of Tanger. At some time – the exact date remains disputed – he flew from Tanger to Lisbon and then drove to the border town of Elvas. According to his own claim, on August 23 he visited Badajoz, the city taken by the Nationalist troops on August 14. In late August he was back in Tanger. On August 30, 1936 The Chicago Tribune published his correspondence, titled Slaughter of 4,000 at Badajoz, ‘City of Horrors’ and reportedly written in Elvas in the very early hours of August 25. The article presented bestial atrocities of Nationalist troops, including machine-gunning of 1,800 Republican captives in the bull-ring. Other episodes, reportedly either witnessed by or referred to Allen, included executions of children, random killings on the streets and the organized action of burning the corpses. The article immediately became a media scoop and was for weeks and months referred in various newspapers across the world.

=== Interview with José Antonio Primo de Rivera ===
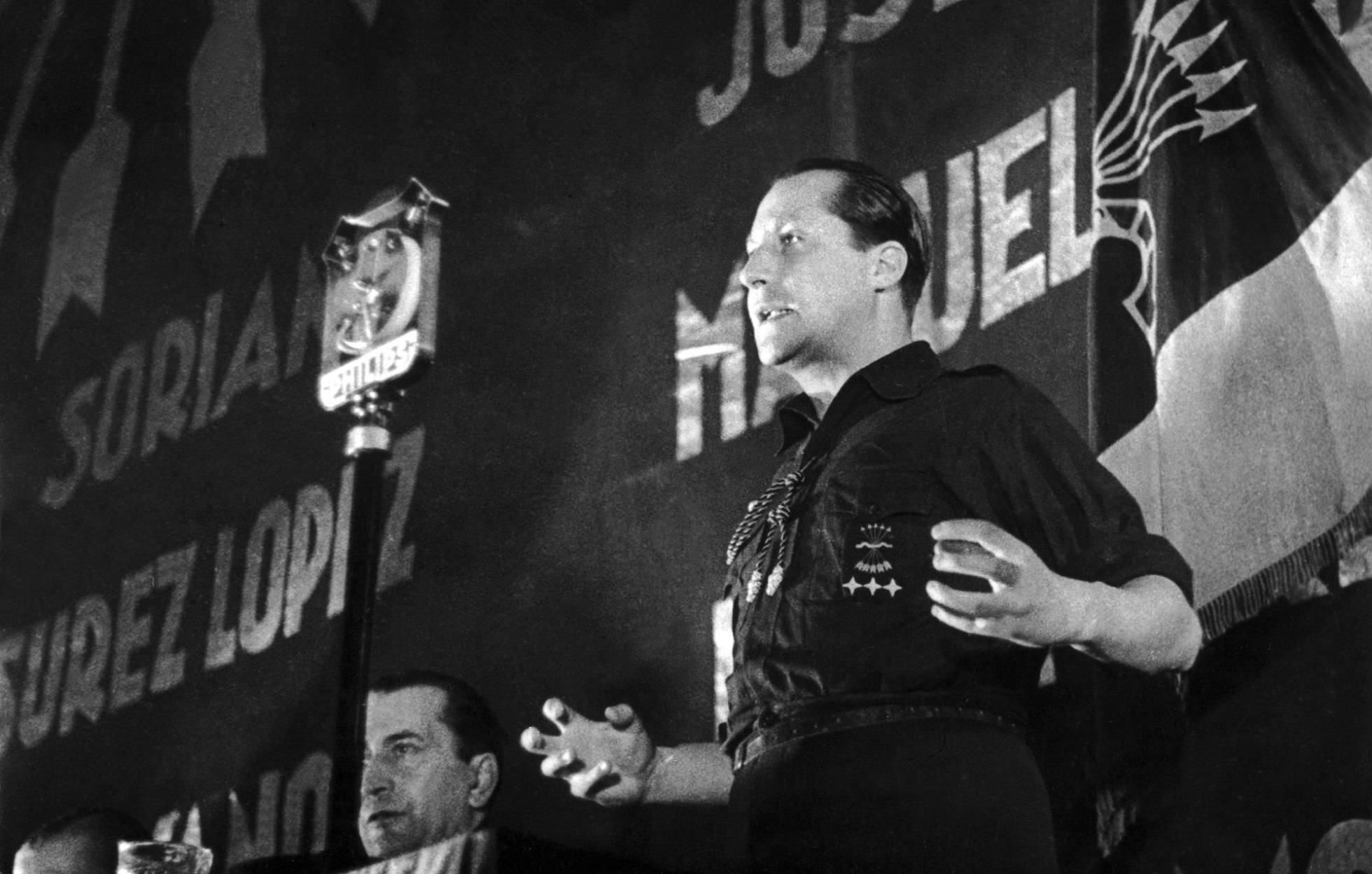
Jose Antonio (before 1936)

Following at least one more visit to Lisbon some time in September 1936 Allen entered the Republican zone. Thanks to his friendship with Rodolfo Lópis, at the time sub-secretary in the newly formed Largo Caballero government, he managed to secure interview with José Antonio Primo de Rivera, the Falange leader imprisoned since March and held in the Alicante prison. The interview, in presence of anarchist militiamen, took place on October 3 in the prison premises; it was published in Chicago Daily Tribune on October 9, 1936. According to the publication, José Antonio expressed dismay that traditional interests of the Spanish establishment were taking precedence over Falange's aims of sweeping social change, though some scholars speculate that the prisoner exaggerated to curry favors with his jailers. Allen thought his performance "a magnificent bluff". According to some, imprudent outbursts by José Antonio during the interview reinforced hostility of the anarchists and contributed to his later execution. Shortly before death Primo distanced himself from numerous statements attributed to him by Allen.

== American intermezzo (1937–1940) ==
=== Ken ===
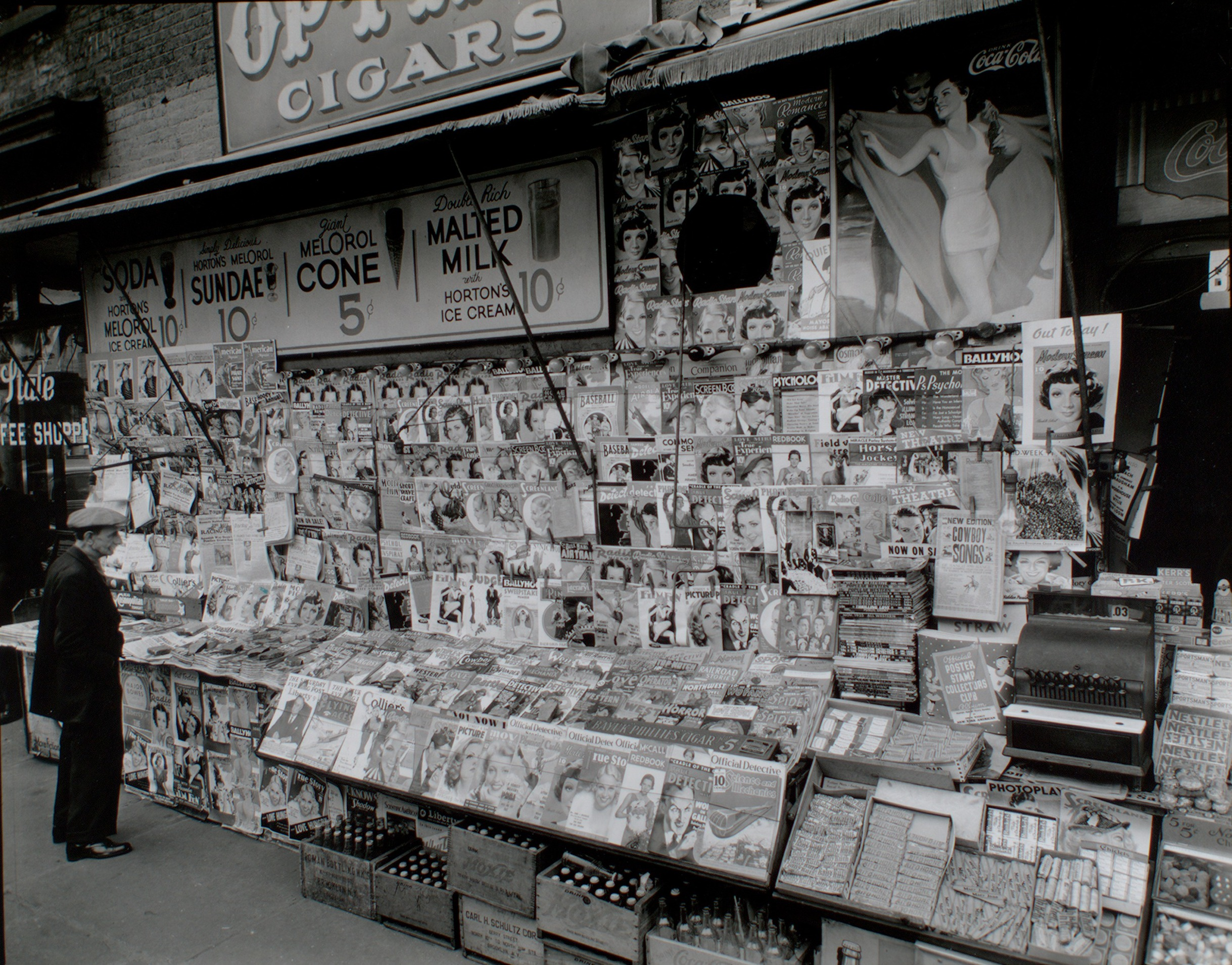
newsstand, New York, 1930s

Allen was last seen in Spain in May 1937, when in Bilbao he interviewed a shot down German pilot, who earlier had taken part in the bombing raid over Guernica. Some time in the spring he was fired by the Hearst-held anti-Republican Tribune. At that time the Esquire publisher David Smart intended to launch a new magazine, a semimonthly called Ken; it was supposed to give the public the "lowdown" on world events as "insiders" see them, though the concept was increasingly evolving towards a magazine for the underdog, militantly antifascist. Allen was hired as the first editor-in-chief, largely thanks to his earlier Chicago Tribune correspondence. In early summer of 1937 Allen returned to New York and began to gather a staff of militant liberal writers. However, the owners were increasingly at a loss as to the format of Ken; also, Allen's idea "apparently savored too much of historical study" and was not very much appreciated. Eventually Allen was sacked and replaced with the onetime Tribune correspondent, George Seldes, who managed the short-lived magazine during the next few months to come.

=== Aid to refugees and own literary plans ===
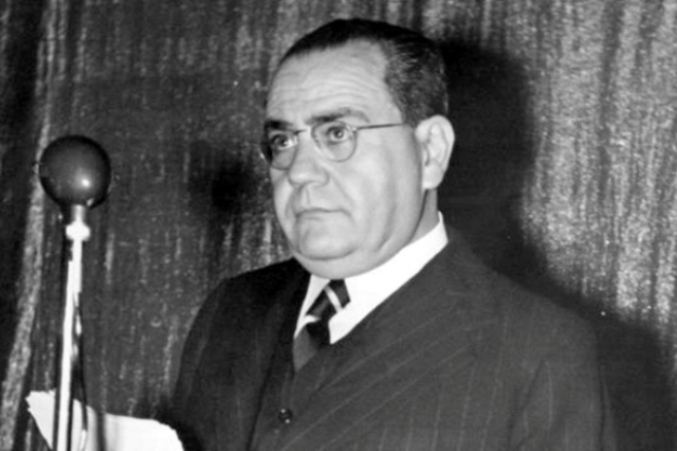
Juan Negrin

In 1938–1940 Allen resided in New York and was engaged in correspondence related to Spain, e.g. he propagated rumors that at the front the POUM militiamen played football with the Nationalists. In 1938 he prefaced Robert Capa's photo album Death in the making. Later he was engaged in assistance to refugees who reached the US. In May 1939 he was supposed to serve as an interpreter to Juan Negrín during his appointment with Roosevelt. The meeting was cancelled at short notice; eventually Negrin met Eleanor Rosevelt and Allen managed to forge a friendly relation with her. On behalf of the Spanish Refugee Relief Campaign he used to make frequent representations to the State Department. He also toyed with an idea of writing a history of the Spanish Civil War; he worked with Herbert Southworth and Barbara Tuchman compiling data. The project ended up as a 72-page manuscript on Badajoz; it has never been published. In the spring of 1940 Allen was deeply moved when Gustav Regler dedicated to him his book The Great Crusade.

== Back in Europe and Africa (1940–1943) ==
=== Emergency Rescue Committee ===
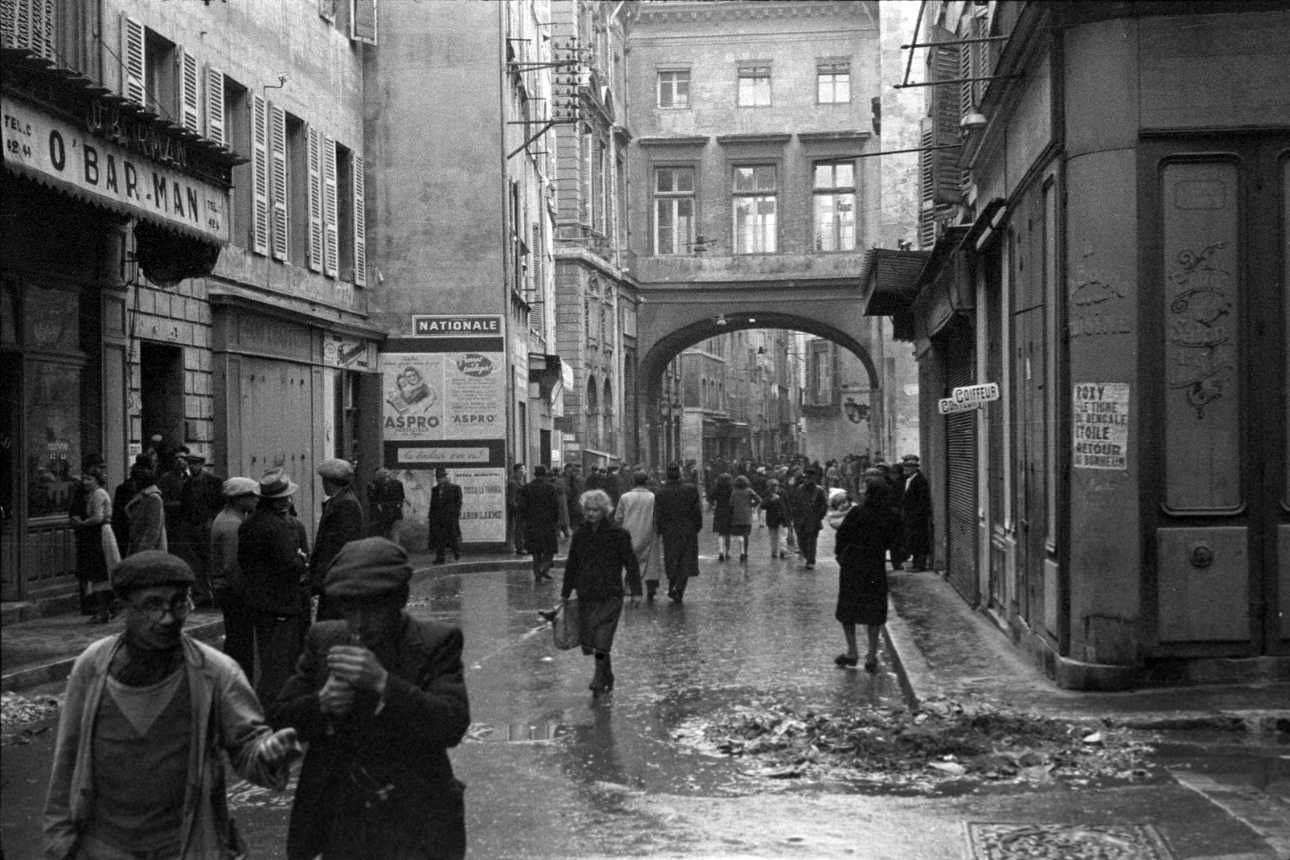
Marseille, early 1940s

Some time in 1940 Allen became engaged with Emergency Rescue Committee, an American NGO set up to assist endangered individuals trapped in the Vichy France. Late that year he was appointed head of the existent ERC mission in Marseille. En route to France, in Africa, he interviewed general Weygand. Upon arrival in Marseille Allen found himself in conflict with the hitherto head of the mission, Varian Fry; Allen denounced him to ERC as supporter of "POUM Trotskyites". In January 1941 Allen interviewed Pétain and posed as a journalist impressed with Vichy France. The struggle for control against Fry lasted until February 1941, when Allen departed to Paris. Independently of Fry he was mounting an operation of moving a group of people from Oran to Gibraltar. However, he was followed by French security, which in March detained him when crossing the demarcation line back to the Vichy zone. His Oran operation also ended up in total failure, with most refugees arrested by the French security.

=== Detainee ===
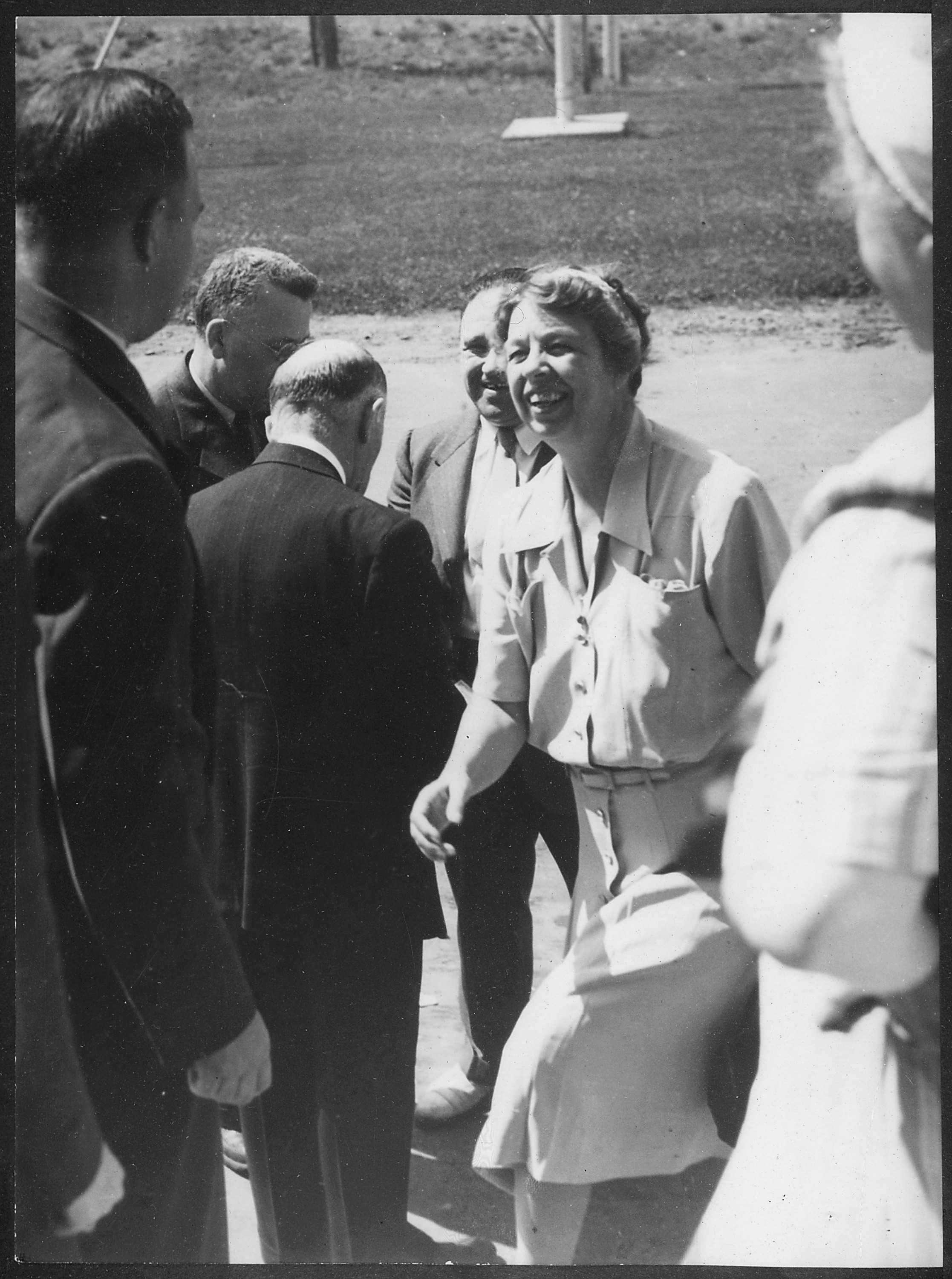
Eleanor Roosevelt, 1941

Upon arrest Allen was formally charged with illegal crossing of the demarcation line between the occupied and the Vichy parts of France. However, he was suspected of engagement in unspecified subversive activities, possibly involving spying or sabotage on part of the British. He was placed in prison in Chalon-sur-Saône and was held there until July 1941. He was Interrogated by the French police, SS and Gestapo, but according to his own account, he revealed no meaningful information on his ERC-related activities. In the summer he was moved to another prison in Dijon. During his incarceration Allen lost 38 lb (some 17 kg). Though the US ambassador to Vichy admiral Leahy was rather skeptical and annoyed by suspected Allen's subversive activity, it was Eleanor Roosevelt who lobbied for US efforts towards Allen's release. Eventually following 4 months behind bars he was exchanged for a German correspondent arrested in New York and in August 1941 Allen was back in the United States.

=== North African campaign ===
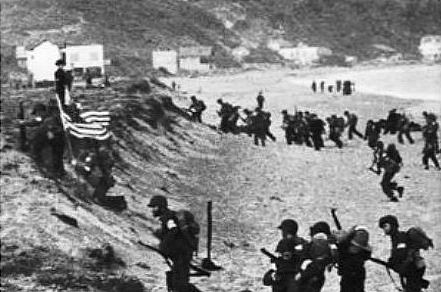
Operation Torch, 1942

Back in the United States Allen became engaged with the US military, though neither the timing nor exact mechanism of his involvement are clear. The army propaganda department considered him knowledgeable and useful when preparing the plans for invasion in Africa. When Operation Torch commenced in November 1942, Allen was heading a propaganda unit named Psychological Warfare Branch. Following successful seizure of Algiers he was resident in the city within the compound formed by the general Eisenhower's headquarters; he appeared as an "assimilated" colonel. There is little information on Allen's service, except that as head of "Office of War Information" he organized propaganda movies intended for French audience. It is known that he served some 5 months, until March 1943, but none of the sources consulted provides information on reasons of his release. No Allen's press correspondence from the period of November 1942 – March 1943 has been identified. In the early spring of 1943 he was back in New York, his successor in Algeria was Southworth.

== Retiree (after 1943) ==
=== Withdrawal into privacy ===
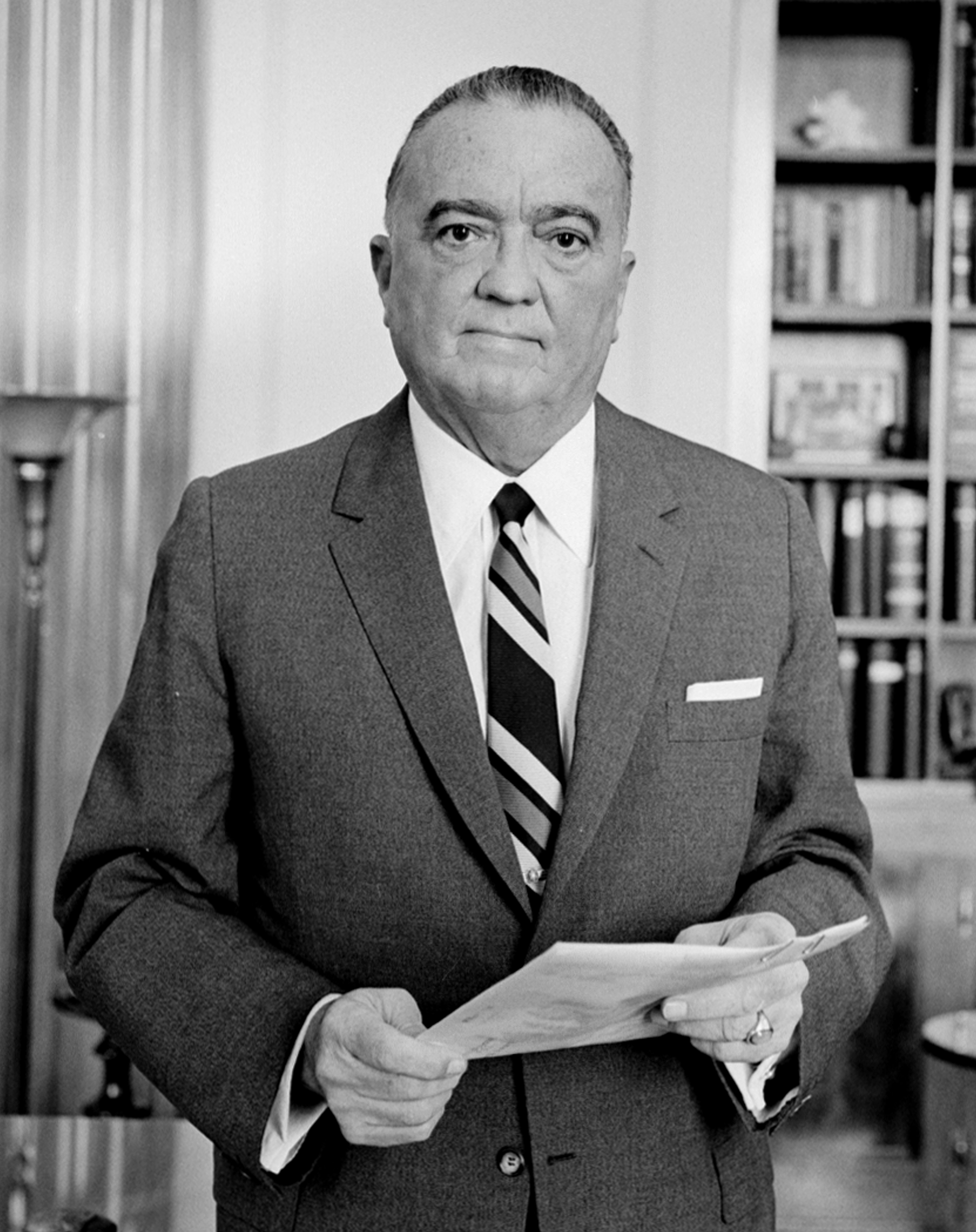
Hoover, 1961

In 1944 Allen moved to Seattle to take care of his ailing father, but in 1947 the family settled in Carmel, California. He intended to publish a book titled The Day Will End: a personal adventure behind Nazi lines; eventually this project came to nothing. He effectively retired as a press correspondent, living off his father's inheritance. Exact reasons for his withdrawal into privacy are not clear. One scholar writes that "what happened exactly remains a mystery but it appears that there were few commissions coming his way, because he seems to have been blacklisted". The suggestion advanced is that since FBI and Hoover personally considered Allen a Communist supporter – the charge he denied – he might have been subject to some harassment. He was reportedly increasingly downcast and disillusioned, especially that "all conspired to drain away his optimism and determination to go fighting". Another version of his withdrawal is that Allen was getting increasingly consumed by alcoholism. One source claims he assumed an unspecified teaching role.

=== Back-seat Hispanist ===
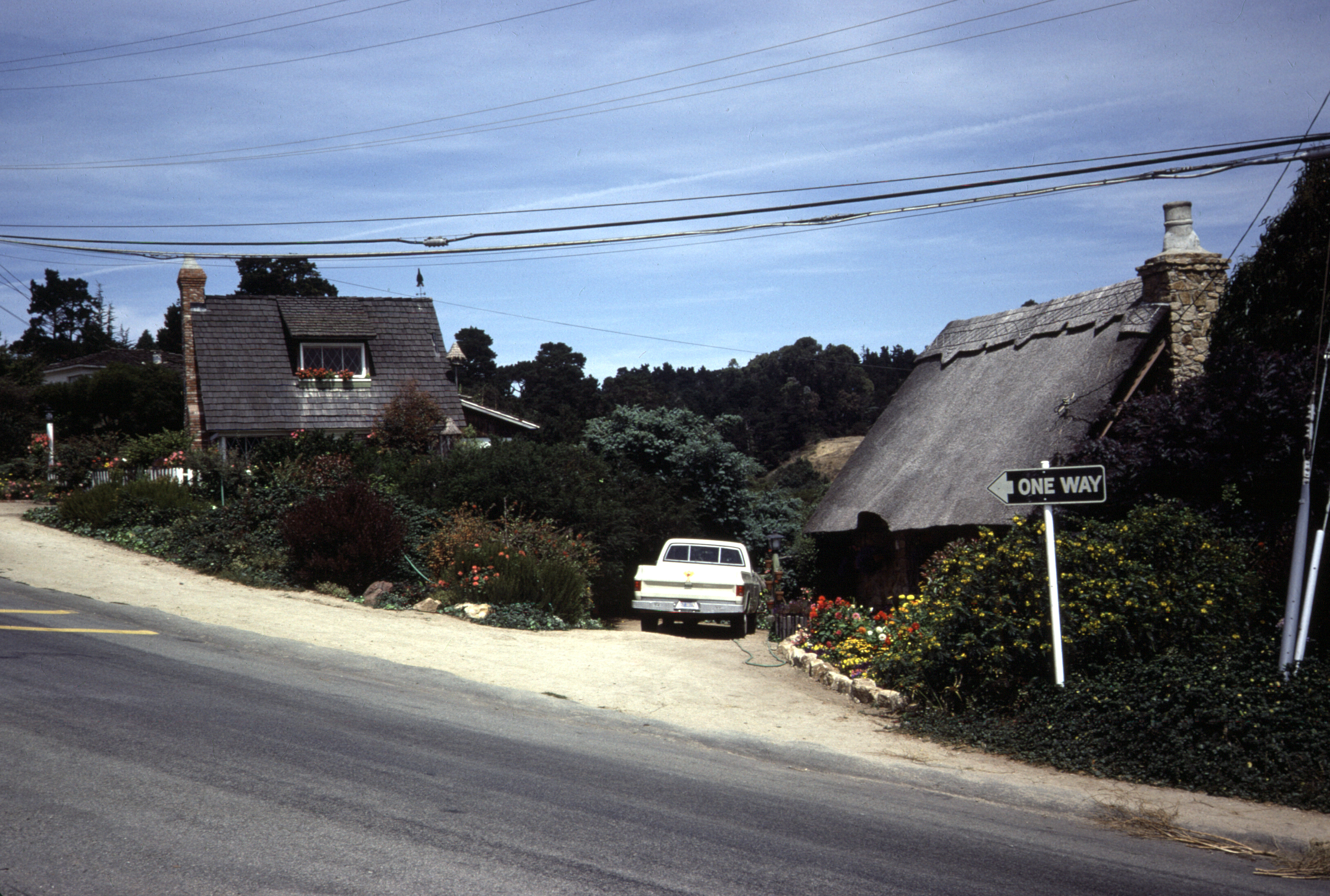
Carmel, early 1970s

Allen followed scientific debate on recent history of Spain and at times attended related seminars, e.g. the one of 1964, organized in Stanford by the Hispanic America Society. He remained in touch with many Hispanists, though particularly with Southworth, who turned from his junior research assistant to a recognized though non-academic historian; he remained a great admirer of Allen. Both considered themselves morally obliged to debunk lies of Francoist propaganda. In the 1960s Allen warned Southworth about would-be CIA assassination; he also tried to use his American literary connections to get Southworth's El mito de la cruzada de Franco released in the US, but to no avail. He also cultivated friendship with Gerald Brenan, whom he inspired towards Spanish history back in the mid-1930s. However, Allen was somewhat skeptical about Hugh Thomas, who reportedly refused to take sides and was "terribly fuzzy about a lot of things"; he remained also cautious about Burnett Bolloten. Himself Allen published nothing. He died in 1972 because of a stroke.

== Controversies ==
=== Badajoz and Spanish Civil War reporting ===
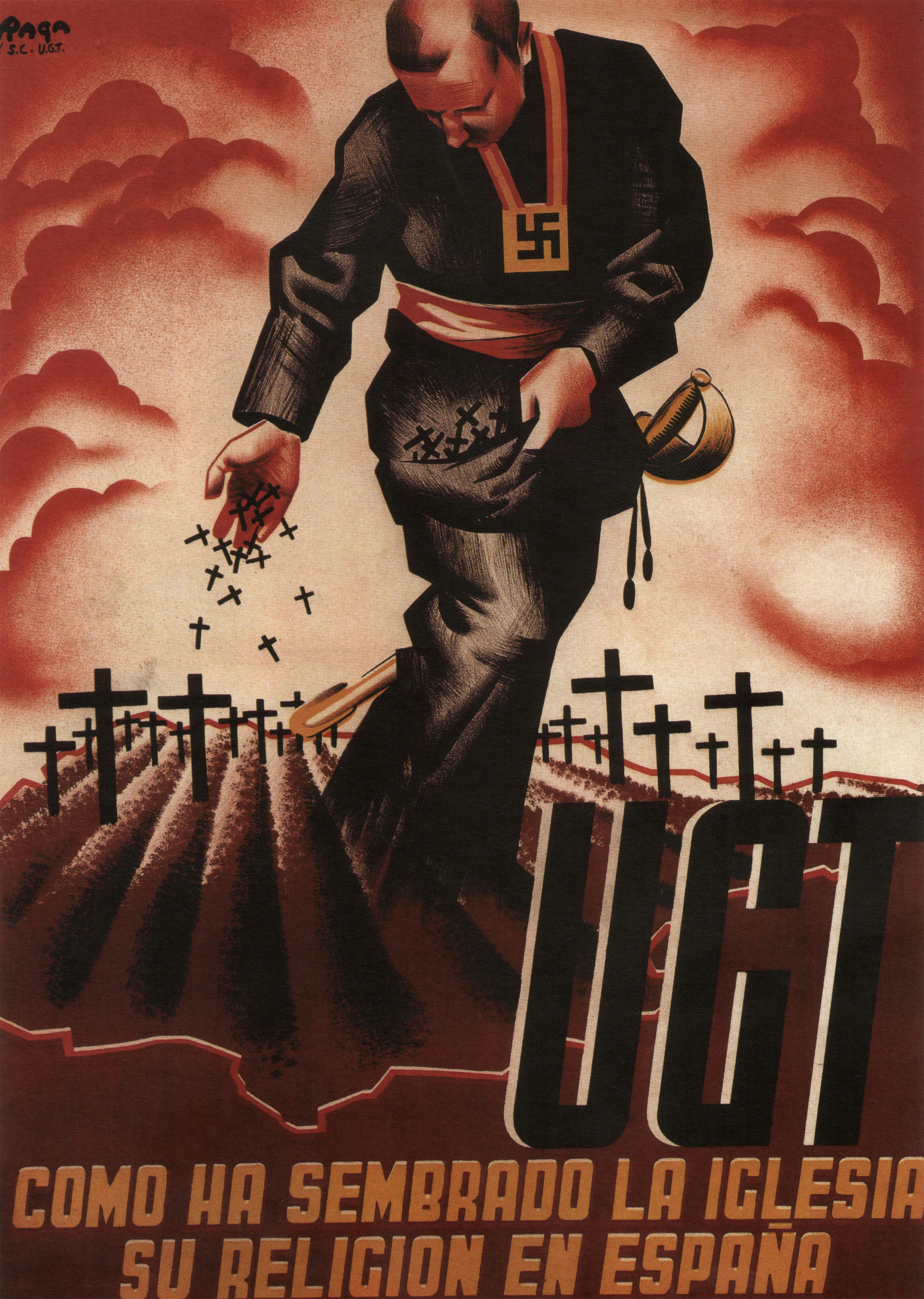
Republican wartime propaganda poster

Many scholars consider Allen one of the best informed foreign correspondents active during the Spanish Civil War, the one who avoided usual trappings and stereotypes and delivered competent, informative correspondence. Some authors present Allen as a rare case of professional, impartial press journalist active during the Spanish war, as “dispassionate correspondents were nearly impossible to find”; the Badajoz article is listed as example of his craft. The Badajoz article is indeed at times referred as a quintessence of reporting; one academic scholar of journalism noted that it "deserves to be read by every student of journalism". His 3 pieces – interview with Franco, Badajoz report and interview with José Antonio – are at times referred as 3 most important journalistic contributions during the entire war. They made enormous impact, also globally, and until today they serve as key first-hand sources when discussing personality of Franco (shooting half Spain if necessary) or Nationalist atrocities (bull-ring blood orgy and 4,000 killed in Badajoz).

There is a group of historians who offer an entirely different perspective. According to this theory, already prior to 1936 Allen turned a zealous radical-left winger. In one version, after the outbreak of the Spanish Civil War he immediately turned into a “soldado de papel”, a committed Republican propagandist ready for any manipulation, misrepresentation and outward lie needed when in service of the cause he supported; in a slightly less damning version he was at least tilted towards the Republic. Particular criticism is directed at the Badajoz correspondence; initially it was claimed that general figures and many episodes from this article were invented by Allen. Recent works are supposed to demonstrate that Allen has visited neither Badajoz nor even the province of Badajoz and that he faked the entire correspondence, including false days when the article has allegedly been written and wired. Some authors claim that Allen produced lies to divert attention from carnage in the Modelo prison. Also authenticity of alleged Franco's comments is questioned, while Primo himself denied statements attributed to him.

=== ERC Marseille mission ===
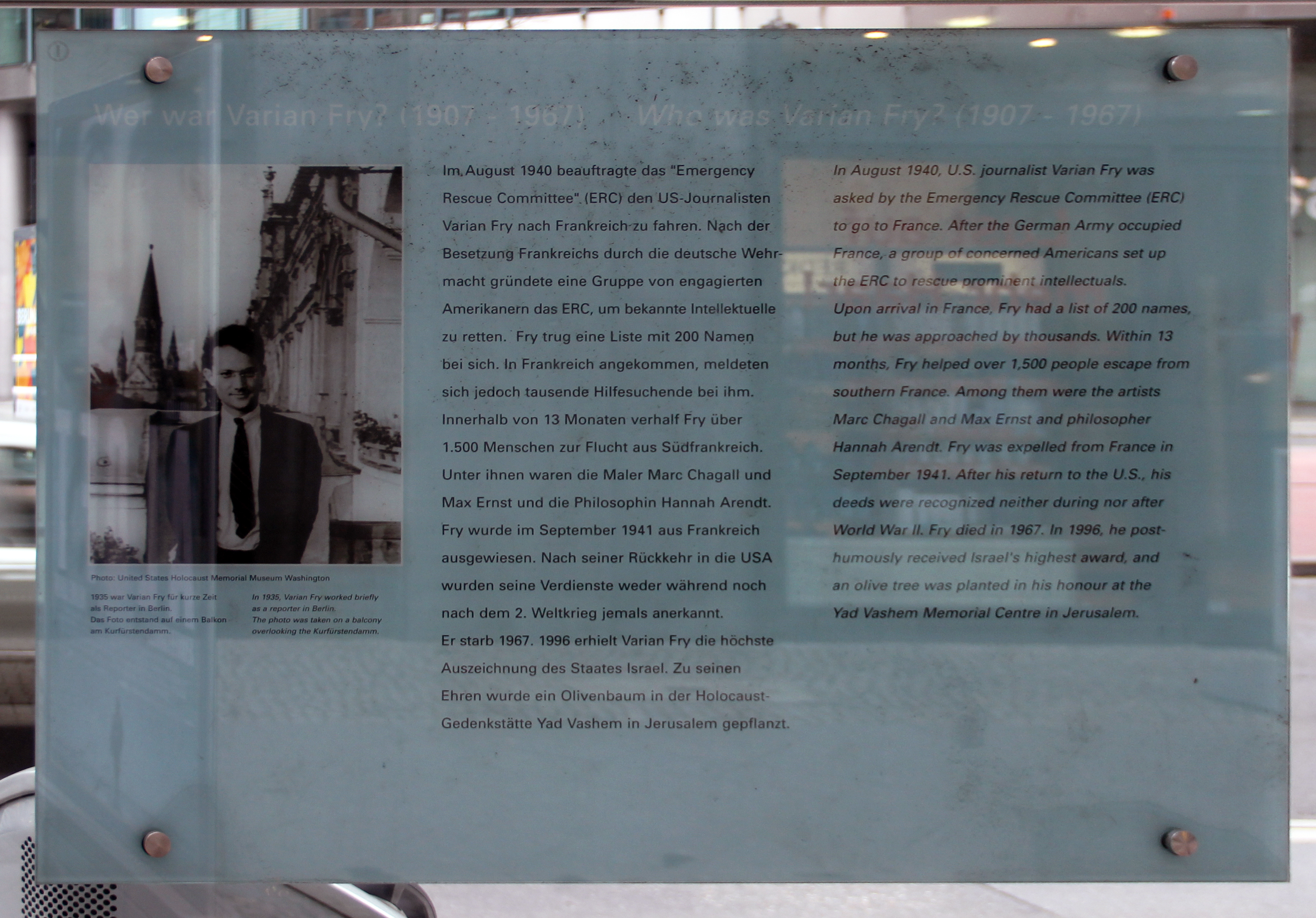
Varian Fry

In some historiographic works related to ERC activities in Marseille and in France Allen is presented as a particularly repulsive figure. He appears as dictatorial, bossy and arrogant man, bullying and disdainful towards Americans who were supposed to be his subordinates; some scenes portray a hysterical person losing control and indulging in outbursts of fury. Moreover, in various accounts he emerges as an entirely incompetent type who was neither willing to listen to more experienced colleagues nor to learn from his own mistakes, the one who boasted of his own importance. The operations he planned are depicted as amateurish and endangering rather than helping people; his own capture and the collapse of his Oran scheme are referred as “too perfect an end for a boasting, blustering fool not to give observers the moral satisfaction of seeing someone reap his just rewards”. Some accounts suggest that Allen mounted unclear financial operations. His personality is presented as opposite to this of Varian Fry, the genuine heart and mind of the Marseille ERC.

In an exactly antithetical perspective, advanced by one eminent historian, Fry and Allen appear in entirely different roles. Fry is depicted as a “nervous and hypersensitive” person who resented reasonable arrangements offered by Allen. It was “too volatile” Fry, not Allen, who remained obsessed with his own status and desperately tried to cling to his position against clear orders from the ERC board back in New York. Moreover, Fry is pictured as a narrow-minded manager, who when executing rescue missions focused merely on people of his own class, artists and intellectuals, while Allen had a broader view and was keen to help all anti-Fascists. Allen's intention to run the Marseilles mission by proxy does not result from his incompetence, cowardice or laziness, but is a mark of his professional caution and far-sightedness. The ERC success of getting thousands of refugees to safety – including Marc Chagall, Max Ernst, Heinrich Mann, Hannah Arendt and many others – is credited to Allen as his work.

== See also ==
- Massacre of Badajoz
- Varian Fry
