= Walter Neves =

Brazilian biologist, archeologist, and anthropologist

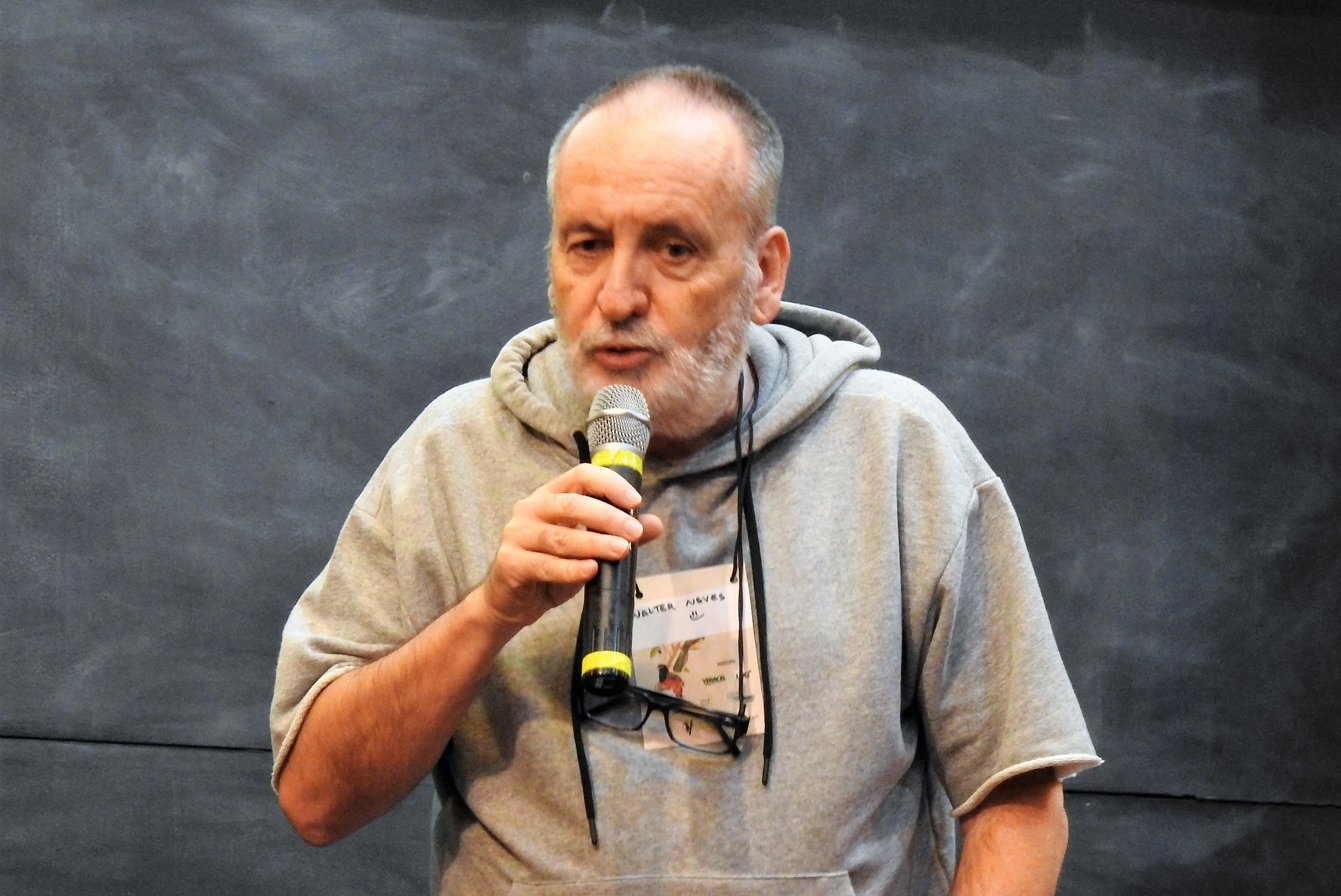
- Born: October 17, 1957 (age 69); Três Pontas, Minas Gerais, Brazil
- Education: University of California, Berkeley; University of São Paulo
- Occupations: Anthropologist; Archeologist; Biologist
- Employer: University of São Paulo

Walter Alves Neves (Três Pontas, October 17, 1957) is a Brazilian biologist, archeologist, anthropologist and a retired professor from the Department of Genetics and Evolutionary Biology of the Institute of Biosciences at the University of São Paulo. He was responsible for the study of Luzia, the oldest human skeleton on the American continent that was discovered by French archaeologist Laming-Emperaire during the 1970s, and the oldest rock inscription on the American continent, Taradinho.

== History ==
Neves was born in Três Pontas, Minas Gerais, the second son of a bricklayer father and a saleswoman mother, and moved to São Bernardo do Campo in 1970. His first job was as a general helper at the Primicia Suitcase factory, and later at the Rolls-Royce airplane turbine factory in São Bernardo, where he worked for ten years. He has been an open homosexual since the 1980s and was married to the publicist Wagner Fernandes (died of AIDS in 1992).

He graduated in Biological Sciences from USP, graduating in (1981), completed his pre-doctorate (there was no sandwich doctorate - Capes' scholarship program is called the Sandwich Doctorate Program) at Stanford and Berkeley Universities in (1982), D. in Biological Sciences from USP in (1984), post-doctoral fellowships at the Center for American Archeology, University of Illinois, in (1985) and at the Department of Anthropology of USP (1991–92), Lecturer in Human Evolution at the Department of Genetics and Evolutionary Biology of USP (2000). During pre-doctoral training he was supervised by Prof. Cavalli-Sforza who studied human evolution from molecular markers. Neves worked with craniometric markers for six months under the supervision of Prof. Cavalli-Sforza.

He is a full professor (2008 - 2017), associate (2000 - 2008) and PhD (1992 - 2000) of the USP's Department of Genetics and Evolutionary Biology, where he founded and coordinates the Laboratory for Human Evolutionary Studies, the only one of its kind in Latin America. Has scientific production since 1980 and advises undergraduate and graduate students in the areas of ecological anthropology, biological anthropology, prehistoric archaeology, human ecology, and evolutionary psychology during his ties with USP and the Goeldi Museum in Pará (1988 - 1992). He teaches two courses at the Institute of Biosciences at USP, biological and evolutionary implications of human behavior (for graduate studies) and evolutionary biology (for undergraduate studies).

His model of two main biological components is often adopted for the understanding of the origin and dispersion of anatomically modern humans in the American continent. Other significant contributions were in the study of Amazonian populations, where he was responsible for several studies related to diet and health of riverine populations together with Prof. Rui Murrieta (IB-USP), his supervisor at the time.

It is especially interested in the investigation of the origin of man in America, and is also dedicated to scientific dissemination, promoting and conducting lectures, museum exhibits, and articles, being the coordinator of the permanent exhibition "From ape to man" at Catavento Institute (2014 - ). Since 2013 he is responsible for the project "Biocultural hominin evolution in the Zarqa River Valley, Jordan: a paleoanthropological approach", in Jordan, seeking to study the records of the first humans who left Africa towards Asia.

He was honored in a special session at the 83rd Annual Meeting of the American Association of Physical Anthropologists (2014) with addresses by Prof. Jane Buikstra (Arizona State University) and Prof. Darna Dufour (University of Colorado - Boulder). He was also honored by his academic pupil, Prof. Mark Hubbe, in the journal PaleoAmerica (2015).

In an interview for Piauí magazine, he said that he had retired due to being diagnosed with burnout syndrome.

In 2018 he ran for federal deputy for São Paulo, for the Free Fatherland Party (PPL), representing the Engaged Scientists alongside Mariana Moura, as state deputy, for the same party, and received 0.05% of the votes.

== Luzia ==
Walter Neves was not the discoverer of the fossil of Luzia, but he was the one who had access to the skull, which was in the National Museum in Rio de Janeiro, and who prepared more detailed studies of the piece. It was he who baptized the archeological find of Luzia, previously called only the skeleton of Lapa Vermelha IV, in reference to the archeological site where it was found, excavated by the French-Brazilian mission, coordinated by Annette Emperaire.

== Controversy over human occupation in Brazil ==
Neves has been engaged in an academic discussion with archaeologist Niéde Guidon over the last few decades regarding the dating of man's arrival in America. While he defends an arrival between 20 thousand and 12 thousand years ago, Guidon defends the theory that man may have arrived around 70 or 80 thousand years ago, because of the remains of a campfire and stone pieces found at the Boqueirão da Pedra Furada archeological site, in Piauí, in 1978. Guidon's theory was widely rejected by scientists from the United States, and also by Neves. In 1990 American archaeologist Tom Dillehay of the University of Kentucky saw the instruments and recognized that some of them looked like they were made by humans. In 2006, two scientists, Eric Boeda, from the University of Paris, and Emílio Fogaça, from the Catholic University of Goiás, released the results of their analysis, and concluded that the stone pieces were indeed man-made, with dates between 33,000 and 58,000 years old. After the results were released, Neves said, "From my point of view, this is incontrovertible evidence that the artifacts were made by humans",(...) "She deserves this credit". In 2012 Neves said that after having access to the lithic material that Niéde herself made available, he believes 99.9% that she is correct, but still not totally convinced.

== Areas of dedication ==
- Biological anthropology
- Ecological anthropology
- Archaeology of hunter-gatherer
- Human evolution
- Speciation

== Scientific publications ==
Book

- “Antropologia Ecológica. Um Olhar Materialista Sobre As Sociedades Humanas”, São Paulo (SP): Cortez, 1996, v.1. p. 86.

Most important articles

- “O modelo dos dois componentes biológicos principais: sua inserção nos eventos expansionistas do final do pleistoceno e suas implicações para a origem do Homo sapiens” in O Carste. Belo Horizonte (MG), v.14, n.1, p. 42 - 49, 2002.
- “Fuegian cranial morphology: the Haush” in Ciência e Cultura. São Paulo (SP), v.53, n.2, p. 69 - 71, 2001
- “The Buhl burial” in American Antiquity. Estados Unidos, v.65, n.-, p. 191 - 193, 2000.

== See also ==
- Models of migration to the New World
- Luzia Woman
