= John Thompson Whitaker =

American journalist

John T. Whitaker
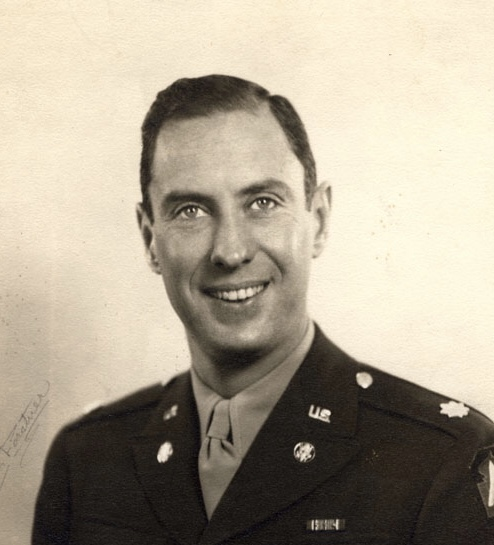
- Whitaker, c. 1942-1945
- Born: January 25, 1906; Chattanooga, Tennessee, U.S.
- Died: September 11, 1946 (aged 40); Walter Reed Hospital, Washington, D.C., U.S.
- Occupations: Writer and journalist

John Thompson Whitaker (January 25, 1906 – September 11, 1946) was an American writer and journalist who served as a correspondent for several prominent newspapers in different parts of the world.

== Training and early life ==
He was trained as a journalist at the University of the South, in Sewanee, Tennessee, and began his career as a reporter at the Chattanooga News. He joined after the New York Herald Tribune, where he was sent as a correspondent to Geneva (Switzerland) from 1931 to 1935, to report on the League of Nations. He had a brother named Spires Whitaker who worked as a doctor for the army during World War II.

== War correspondent ==
In early 1936, he covered the Second Italo-Abyssinian War for CBS, accompanying the Italian troops. The government of Benito Mussolini awarded him the Croce di Guerra ("War Cross") for his reporting on the Italian conquest of Ethiopia.

Shortly after he was assigned by his newspaper to Spain. He entered the country around September 10, 1936. Six years later he would claim he had interviewed General Yagüe, who allegedly had declared having shot 4,000 Republicans in Badajoz; until today this statement is quoted as proof that the Badajoz massacre indeed took place. He also claimed to have interviewed Mohamed Mizzian, a Moorish general of the Nationalists, and reported on Mizzian giving two captured teenage girls, one found with a trade-union card, to some forty of his troops for mass rape near Navalcarnero. Whitaker described how Mizzian "smirked when I remonstrated with him. 'Oh, they'll not live more than four hours,' he said."

He moved back to Europe in mid-1939, in connection with World War II, working for the Chicago Daily News and the New York Post. He moved to Rome, from where he reported the war and the activities of the National Fascist Party. As a convinced democrat, his articles criticized the atrocities of the regimes of Mussolini and Hitler. This made the fascist regime uncomfortable, and in 1941 he was ordered to leave Italy.

At the time of his expulsion from Mussolini's Italy, Time reported that Whitaker's dispatches were "displeasing" to the government. The Italian government was reluctant to formally expel the reporter on whom they had bestowed the Italian War Cross five years earlier, and officials told Whitaker they had "nothing personal" against him and advised him, "You are not expelled, but you must leave." Whitaker reportedly insisted on being formally expelled.

== Books ==
- Fear came on Europe. Hamish Hamilton, London, 1937.
- Americas to the South. The MacMillan Company, New York, 1939.
- Prelude to World War. A witness from Spain. Foreign Affairs, Vol. 21, n.° 1, October 1942.
- We cannot escape history. The Macmillan Company, New York, 1943.
