= Rui Neves (footballer, born 1965) =

Portuguese footballer

Personal information
- Full name: Rui dos Santos Cordeiro Neves
- Date of birth: 10 March 1965 (age 61)
- Place of birth: Vinhais, Portugal
- Height: 1.84 m (6 ft 1/2 in)
- Position: Forward

Youth career
- 1978–1983: Beira-Mar

Senior career*
Years	Team	Apps	(Gls)
1983–1984	Beira-Mar		
1984–1986	Leixões		
1986–1987	Estarreja		(17)
1987–1988	Porto	3	(0)
1988–1990	Espinho	52	(14)
1990–1991	União Madeira	27	(3)
1991–1992	Aves	34	(15)
1992–1994	Salgueiros	17	(3)
1993–1994	Felgueiras	8	(1)
1994–1995	Famalicão	5	(0)
1995–199?	Darlington	5	(0)
199?–1996	Marco	9	(0)
1996–1997	Vianense	8	(2)
1997–1998	Lamego		
1998–1999	Pedrouços		
1999–200?	Merelinense		
200?–2002	Sp. Campo		
2002–2003	Anadia		
2004–2005	Oiã		
2005–2006	Campia		

International career
1987	Portugal U21	4	(0)
- * Club domestic league appearances and goals

Rui dos Santos Cordeiro Neves (born 10 March 1965) is a Portuguese former footballer who played in the Primeira Liga for Porto, Espinho, União Madeira and Salgueiros, in the Segunda Divisão de Honra for Aves, Felgueiras and Famalicão, in the regional divisions for a large number of clubs, and in the English Football League Third Division (fourth tier) for Darlington. He made four appearances for Portugal's under-21 team in the 1987 Toulon Tournament.
