= Mário Neves =

Portuguese journalist and diplomat

Mário Neves (1912–1993) was a Portuguese journalist, born in Lisbon.

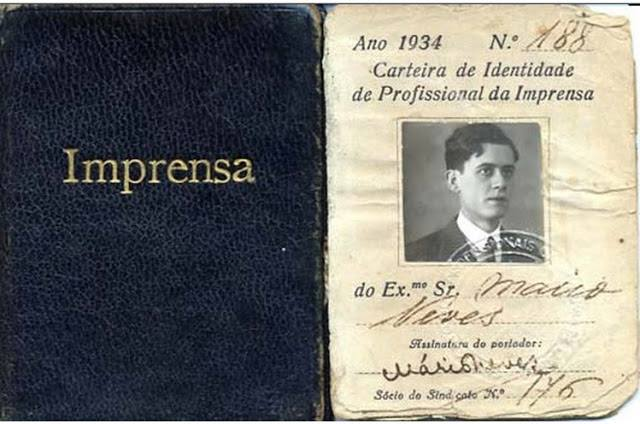
Mario Neves

He worked for 42 years as a journalist for Portuguese newspapers such as O Século and Diário de Lisboa, and was the associate director of A Capital between 1972 and 1974. Neves also served as the director of the Portuguese Institute of Oncology. After the Carnation Revolution he was the Portuguese ambassador in Moscow and the chief of the Portuguese embassies in Mongolia and North Korea.

In 1979 he was appointed Portuguese secretary of state for migration.

In 1936 he covered the Spanish Civil War for the Diário de Lisboa. Together with Daniel Berthet and Marcel Dany, he entered Badajoz after the fall of the city in the early morning of 15 August. They were the first foreign correspondents in Badajoz after the battle and they witnessed the mass executions inside the city. Neves's chronicle was the first about the massacre of Badajoz.

Neves died in 1993.
