= Nieves Yankovic =

Chilean actress and documentary maker

Nieves Yankovic (1916–1985) was a Chilean actress and documentary maker. "The only woman film director in Chile during the fifties and sixties", her documentary Andacollo (1958) influenced socially committed documentary filmmaking in Chile. She has been called "an iconic figure among women filmmakers".

== Life ==
Born in Antofagasta, Nieves Yankovic lived in Europe from 1928 to 1942. She was one of the founders of the University of Chile Experimental Theatre. A film actress under the name Nieves Yanko, she made her debut in Luis Moglia Barth's Romance de medio sieglo (Romance of half a century, 1944). She also acted in Carlos Borcosque's Amarga verdad (1945), Roberto de Ribón's El Padre Pitillo (1946), Carlos Hugo Christensen's La dama de la muerte (1946), Fred Matter's El paso maldito (1949), Pierre Chenal's El ídolo (1952) and Pierre Chenal's Confesiones al amanecer (1954).

Yankovic worked as assistant director under Carlos Hugo Christensen and Pierre Chenal. In 1946 she married Jorge di Lauro, a sound engineer at Chile Films. From 1958 until 1972 the pair directed documentaries together.

After the 1973 Chilean coup d'état, Yankovic and her husband worked as teachers.

== Filmography ==
All co-directed with Jorge di Lauro:

- Andacollo, 1958
- Los aristas chilenos plasticos, 1959–60
- Isla de Pascua, 1961
- Verano en invierno, 1962
- San Pedro de Atacama, 1963-4
- Cuando el pueblo avanza, 1966
- Operacio Sitio, 1970
- Obreros campesinos, 1972)
