= Criado =

Criado is a surname of Portuguese and Spanish origin. It is an occupational surname for someone who was a criado (servant). Notable people with the surname include:

- Borja Criado (born 1982), Spanish footballer
- Caroline Criado-Perez (born 1984), British feminist activist and journalist
- David Carballo Criado (born 2006), Spanish footballer
- Enrique Criado Navamuel (born 1981), Spanish diplomat, lawyer and writer
- Ezequiel Calvente Criado (born 1991), Spanish footballer
- Felipe Alfonso Criado (born 1993), Spanish footballer
- Francisco Aritmendi Criado (1938–2020), Spanish marathon runner
- Manuel Díaz Criado (1898–1947), Spanish general
- Patrick Criado (born 1995), Spanish actor
- Ramón Blanco Criado (1750–1821), Spanish marshal
