= July 1936 military uprising in Seville =

Part of the Spanish Civil War

- Part of the Spanish Civil War
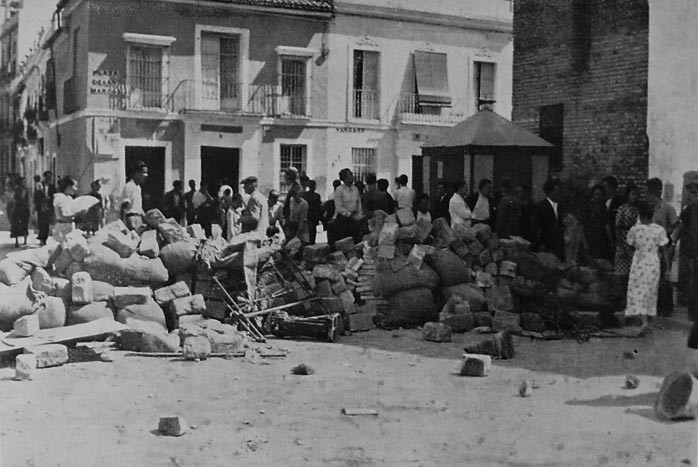
- Barricade in Macarena district
Date	18–22 July 1936
Location	Seville, Spain
Result	Nationalist victory

Belligerents
(Spain) Spanish Republic	(Francoist Spain) Nationalist Spain

Commanders and leaders
José Fernández Villa-Abrille; José M. Varela	Gonzalo Queipo de Llano; José Cuesta Moreneo

Strength
Few hundred	Few hundred

Casualties and losses
Unknown	10–20

The July 1936 military uprising in Seville was part of a nationwide coup d'état in Spain, launched by part of the Spanish army. It was supposed to topple local Republican administrations in Seville and western Andalusia. The uprising commenced on 18 July 1936, led by general Gonzalo Queipo de Llano. The rebels overpowered regional military command and some key units without a shot being fired, but were offered resistance by Guardia de Asalto, subordinated to the civil governor José María Varela; it was overcome later in the day. The days of 19–22 July were mostly about seizing the districts of Triana, Macarena and San Julián; they were controlled by revolutionary trade unions and radical left-wing militias. On 23 July Queipo was fully in control. The successful coup in Seville proved of vital importance for the rebels nationwide; the insurgent pocket in south-western Andalusia enabled the shift of the Army of Africa to the peninsula, and then its rapid advance towards Madrid.

== Conspiracy ==
=== April and May ===
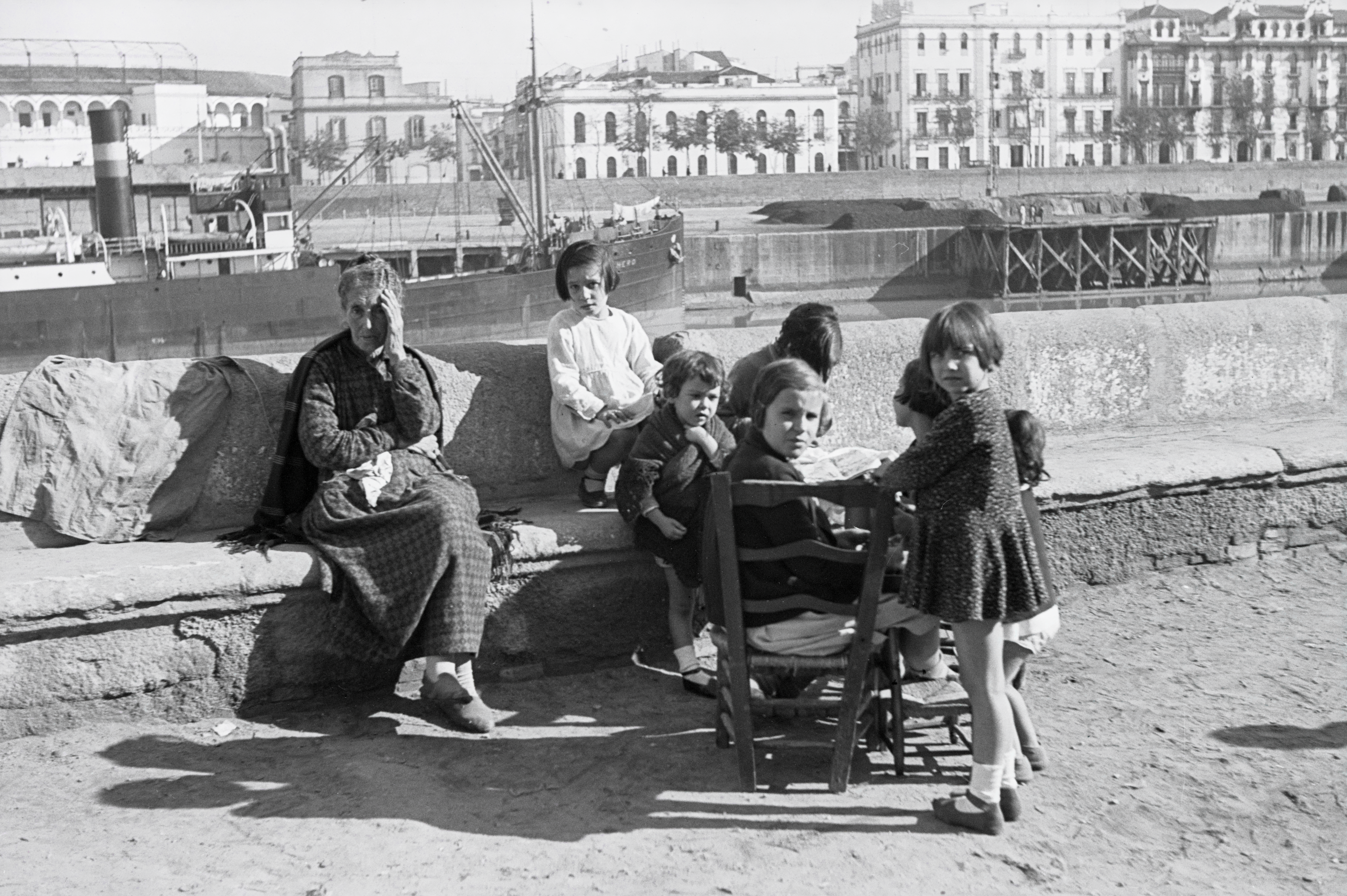
Seville, 1930s

The first information on the military conspiracy in Seville can be traced back to early spring of 1936; it had been unfolding since late March, when comandante Eduardo Álvarez-Rementería and five captains set up a committee "contrario al Frente Popular". In late April the nationwide leader of the conspiracy, Pamplona-based general Emilio Mola, sent his envoy, colonel Francisco García-Escámez, to get in touch with Rementería and agree the basics. At the time PCE workers claimed to have discovered a "fascist plot" at the Tablada airport and alerted provincial authorities, but it is not clear whether the case was indeed related to the military conspiracy; there was no follow-up.

In May there was already a clear leadership of the subversive scheme in place: it consisted of a triumvirate of army officers headed by comandante José Cuesta Monereo and included captains Manuel Gutiérrez Flores and Manuel Escribano Aguirre. They developed an increasingly complex network; one of its key members was comandante Santiago Garrigós, commander of local Guardia Civil's branch comandancia exterior.

Preparations for the coup involved also stockpiling weapons, at the right moment to be handed over to civilians from the Falange or Requeté. In May a junior officer loyal to the government discovered such a stock at the Intendencia offices and reported the officer deemed responsible to his superiors. The case reached the highest provincial strata. The newly appointed commander of the 2. Division, the Seville garrison, and head of the II. Military Region (all Andalusia), general José Fernández Villa-Abrille, excused the officer charged, perhaps on the basis of simple caste solidarity in the military. However, José María Varela Rendueles, also newly appointed civil governor, escalated it to the Ministry of Interior. Eventually the prime minister Santiago Casares Quiroga accepted assurances from Villa-Abrille and took no action. Also in May alarming notes from a communist MP Vicente Uribe, related to strange activity in Seville "fábricas militares", were not acted upon.

=== June ===
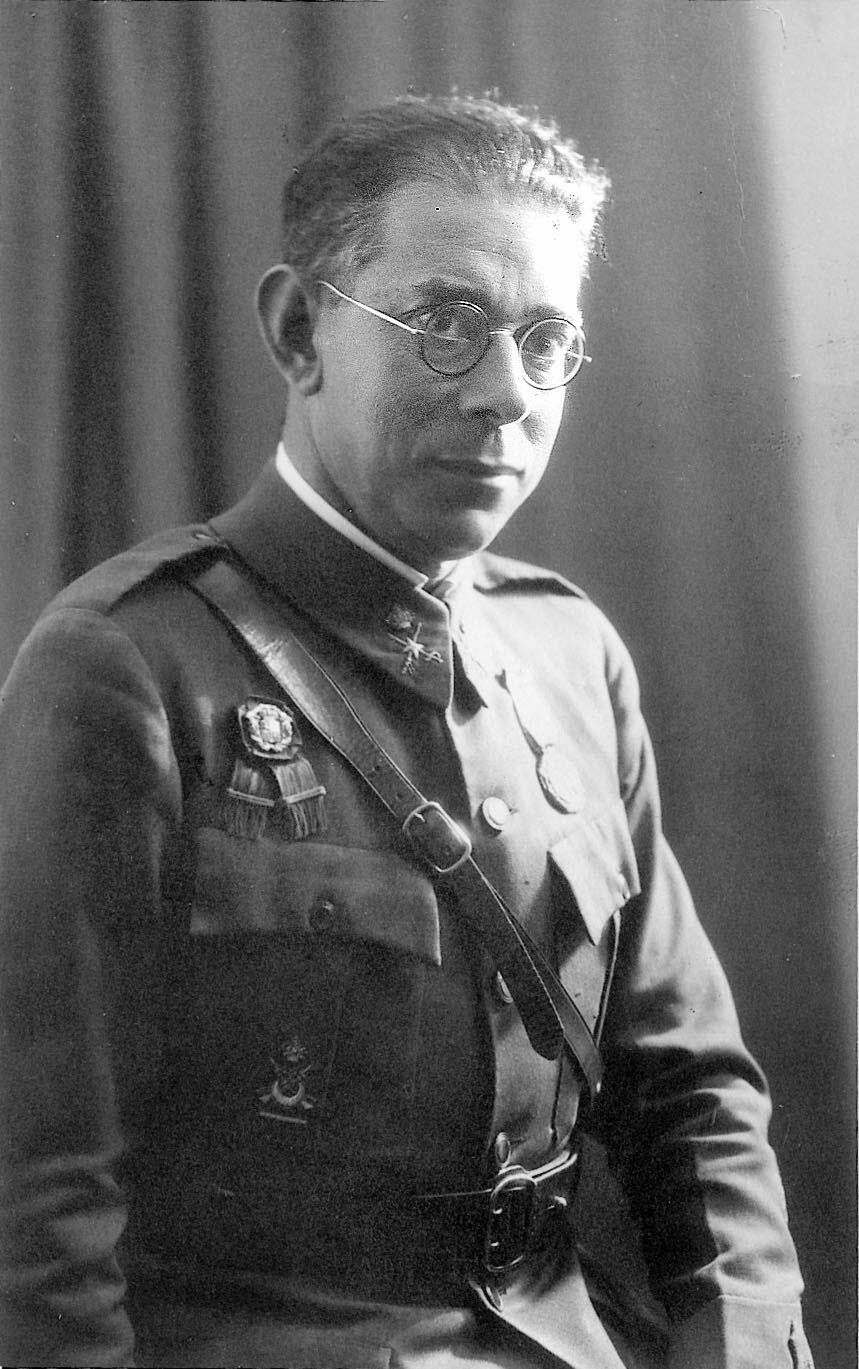
Mola

On 1–2 June in Pamplona Mola met general Gonzalo Queipo de Llano, at the time general inspector of the Carabineros; already back in April he declared himself ready to join the coup. Mola suggested to Queipo that he assume command of the coup in Seville and later became commander of the II. Military Region (all Andalusia). Queipo vacillated; he preferred to assume command in his native Valladolid (VII. Military Region). Upon Mola's insistence – perhaps related to the fact that Queipo was on friendly terms with Villa-Abrille and was expected to lure the latter into conspiracy – Queipo agreed to tour Andalusia and assess the situation for himself.

In mid-June Queipo, who as the Carabineros inspector enjoyed freedom to travel across the country, visited numerous garrisons in Andalusia. He was welcomed rather coldly by local conspirators, who considered him politically capricious and extravagant, stained by earlier republican sympathies and masonic links. He also met Villa-Abrille. Details of their talks are not clear, it is possible if not likely that Queipo at least hinted to the former about a possibility to join a "patriotic action", but there is no information of the military governor joining the plotters; some scholars claim that Villa-Abrille declined the offer. However, his initiative was to assemble corps commanders and visit Varela; the officers were asked one by one to swear loyalty to the Republic. At the time some conspiring officers were already providing regular training to Falange militants, while Carlist requeté geared up in the countryside.

On 23 June Mola again met Queipo in Pamplona; though the latter complained about the Seville conspiracy, it was eventually agreed that Queipo would lead the coup in the Andalusian capital. However, Mola sent García-Escámez to Seville to verify Queipo's claims. Later this month Escaméz toured the province. His cryptic assessment, passed on to Mola, was "las niñas bien, las encargadas pésimas"; it meant that the plot was well developed among junior and middle-rank officers, while the top district command layer remained unreliable. Mola's conclusion based on this and other reports was that the II. Military Region was among those very well prepared, that there was a conspiracy "estado mayor paralelo" operational, and that success in Seville was almost certain. He also changed his original plan, which initially envisioned only northern garrisons advancing upon Madrid in case of failure in the capital; now also the South was about to move.

=== July ===
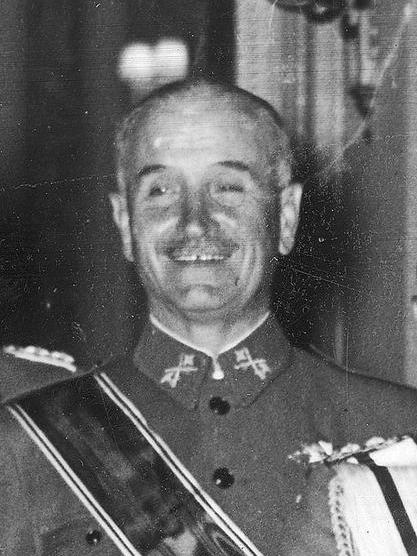
Queipo de Llano

In early July (exact days unclear) Queipo again visited Seville, this time already as the Mola-appointed local commander of the coup, to make sure all preparations to rise were well advanced. Upon news on his arrival, Villa-Abrille travelled to Huelva, reportedly on an inspection tour. However, a scholar suggests that the military governor intended to avoid meeting Queipo. According to this theory, Villa-Abrille knew that he was among the officers under governmental surveillance, he probably expected new ambiguous suggestions and was unwilling either to face the pressure or to get trapped in an uncomfortable position. Again, Villa-Abrille took no specific action to ensure there was nothing suspicious unfolding.

According to one historian, in mid-July Queipo visited the garrison in Málaga, also within the II Military Region. According to another, on 11 July he visited Seville again, met Cuesta and travelled with him to Huelva. Both agree that he sought an interview with Villa-Abrille, but the district commander kept avoiding him. Though there were some outbursts of left-wing radical zeal, e.g. cases of singing of The Internationale by some soldiers in the barracks, there was no organized counter-action by local Communist, Socialist or Anarchist organizations, except usual and chaotic acts of street violence. The focus of Varela was rather on Falange; in July its numerous militants were detained by security.

On orders from the conspiracy command, in the evening of 16 July Queipo boarded a train in Madrid and the following morning he checked into a hotel in Seville. His actions during the following 24 hours are somewhat of a mystery. He immediately departed to Huelva, reportedly to perform inspections in Isla Cristina and Ayamonte, and despite repeated calls from the Seville conspirators, he refused to return to the Andalusian capital. Instead, he visited the Huelva civil governor Diego Jiménez Castellanos, and assured him of total loyalty to the Republic; Jiménez called his fellow governor Varela and informed him about the visit. One scholar suggests that when visiting Huelva, Queipo was simply arranging for himself a way out to Portugal in case the coup fails; another one claims that such supposition "no tiene justificación".

=== Hours before ===
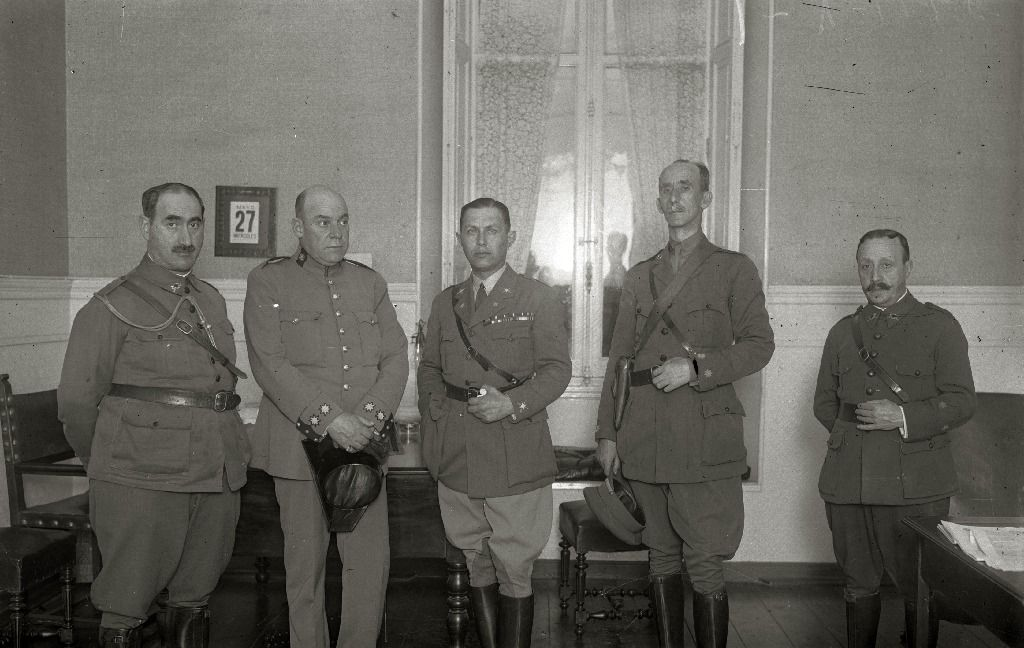
Villa-Abrille

On 17 July around 4 PM it was already known that there was sort of a mutiny unfolding in Spanish Morocco. Casares Quiroga ordered that any officer found travelling outside the area where he was posted should be arrested; a Guardia Civil officer called Varela asking whether this applied also to Queipo, but assured by Jiménez about Queipo's loyalty, Varela ordered not to take action. In the evening Villa-Abrille performed a number of calls to local garrisons and having heard no news of any disorder, he intended to go to rest. At this point Varela had second thoughts about Queipo and called the regional commander; however, Villa-Abrille declared that Queipo was on regular tour of duty and that there was no need to worry. The second-in-command in the II. Military Region, its chief of staff Juan Cantero Ortega, uninvolved in conspiracy, was away on summer leave.

During the late evening of 17 July the Seville conspirators gathered in Garrigós' house to tie the last knots of the rising, planned for the following day. At the same time the PCE leader Manuel Delicado Muñoz met Varela and asked him to form mixed Guardia de Asalto and workers' militia patrols, supposed to keep the military barracks under surveillance; Varela agreed, though he resisted the call to hand out weapons to the militias. During the night the Air Force commander Miguel Nuñez de Prado called Villa-Abrille and asked him to load 3 aircraft, on their way from Madrid with orders to bomb the rebels in Morocco, with bombs at the Tablada airport. Villa-Abrille issued appropriate orders, on which the mid-rank conspiracy officers defaulted. Moreover, one of them tried to destroy the aircraft, already at Tablada. He was apprehended, but the plotters downplayed the incident and reported to Villa-Abrille that the culprit was merely drunk. In the city tension was already running high; during the night the first workers' patrols emerged on the streets and one of them murdered a municipal guard, suspected of having been in anti-republican conspiracy.

In the early hours of 18 July Queipo travelled from Huelva to Seville and had a meeting with local civilian conspirators, informing them that the rising was a matter of hours. Around 11 AM he visited Villa-Abrille; the meeting was cordial and the two parted; perhaps it was a last-minute attempt on the part of Queipo to convince the regional commander. Villa-Abrille gathered all senior officers in the capitania general building and again asked them to swear allegiance to the Republic; for many it was an empty vow. In the early afternoon hours the city council members and the diputación provincial members terminated their regular sessions, planned for the day; among others, they adopted a resolution protesting the killing of the municipal guard.

== Coup ==
=== 18 July ===
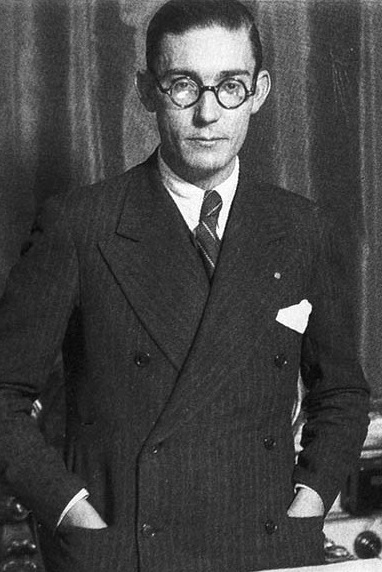
Varela

The coup in Seville commenced around 2 PM, when Queipo, accompanied by a number of rebel officers, reappeared in the capitania general at Plaza de Gavidia. There are numerous opposing versions of what happened later. According to some Queipo stayed put until Villa-Abrille noticed unauthorized individuals; according to others he violently proceeded to detain the district commander; there are also accounts which claim that the two had one more gentle conversation, and it was only afterwards that Villa-Abrille and his staff were disarmed and put under guard. This way or another, apart from verbal altercation, there was no opposition encountered. Shortly afterwards Queipo and his entourage proceeded to the neighboring barracks of the 6. Granada Infantry Regiment, the largest army unit stationed in Seville. Its commander Manuel Allanegui and some of his staff refused to join; they were either lured to the capitania general building and detained, or detained first and led to capitania as prisoners. The entire regiment was easily taken over by the rebels.

The first shots were fired between 3 and 4 PM. Queipo sent patrols to major points in the city to read out the state of war declaration, and started moving sub-units towards the gobierno civil and ayuntamiento. Guardia de Asalto patrols, on Varela's order on alert, in some spots remained confused, but in others confronted the military. A chaotic shootout followed; at one point the Guardia men even attempted to push the military back to the barracks and armored vehicles of the Asaltos fired at Queipo's Gavidia headquarters. However, the loyalists soon started to withdraw and barricaded themselves in 3 key buildings at the central point of Seville, Plaza de la República (now Plaza Nueva): hotel Inglaterra, Telefónica and the civil government. At the time rebel detachments in line with earlier plans took control over some objects, like the Seville radio. Confusion ruled, and some detachments changed sides either willingly, or by mistake.

In the afternoon hours the rebel command started to deploy military detachments in key strategic points of access to the city centre; the intention was to prevent a would-be advance of left-wing militias. Indeed, an increasingly militant crowd started to gather around local Casas del Pueblo and Guardia de Assalto stations in working class districts of Macarena (in the north) and Triana (in the south, across the Guadalquivir); party and trade union leaders demanded weapons. When denied arms, some decided to seize them. A few thousand people besieged the artillery depot at Paseo de Colón; the military repulsed the attack with fire, leaving some 15 people dead. Unable either to reach the centre or to seize weapons, the crowd turned to looting, arson and terror. Working class areas were dominated by chaotic violence; the mob commenced a hunt for individuals deemed enemies of the people, and some 15 churches were set on fire. Trade unions declared general strike.

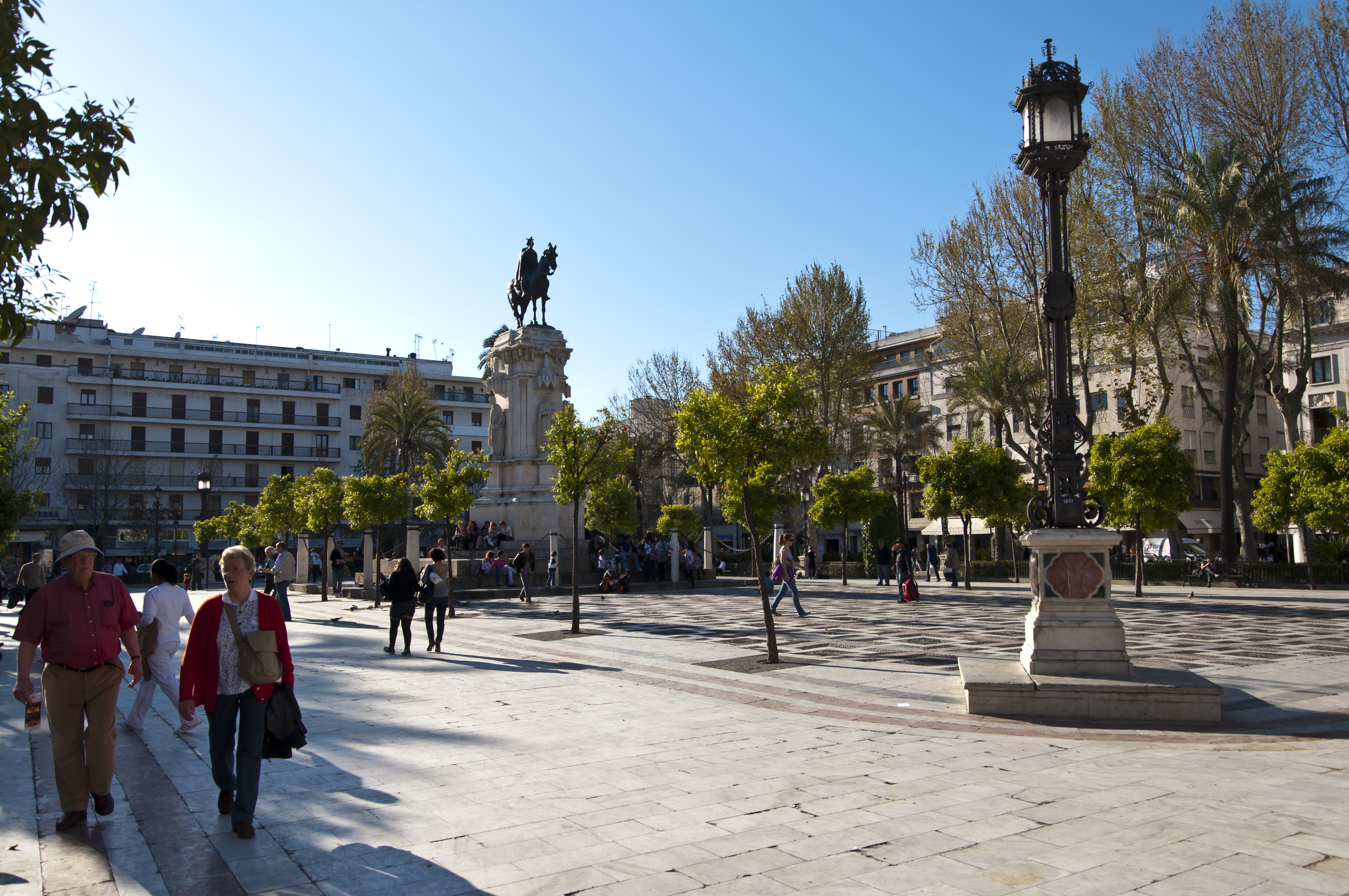
Plaza Nueva (current view)

The Carlist requeté attempt to seize the gobierno civil building failed. Queipo's envoys delivered an ultimatum to besieged Varela, demanding surrender; it was rejected. Around 6.30 PM the rebels deployed a mortar and an artillery piece, and started shelling the buildings held by the Asaltos at Plaza Nueva. Requetés provided cover and tried to penetrate near the besieged objects. Telefónica surrendered first, and Inglaterra second. Varela demanded by phone that aircraft from Tablada – fully controlled by the loyalists - bomb the rebels; the Tablada commander refused and instead sent reinforcements of 100 men; they failed to reach the city centre before the fight was over. Varela rejected suggestions to flee, and in the evening hours he ordered a surrender. The entire combat involved relatively minor troops; Queipo later claimed that some 130-160 of his soldiers seized the city, but historians believe there were a few hundred rebels involved in fighting. There was probably a similar or slightly smaller number of loyalists engaged in combat. By the night the city centre was fully controlled by the rebels, while workers' districts were engulfed in revolutionary chaos. At 9 PM Queipo delivered over the radio the first of his notorious charlas.

=== 19 July ===
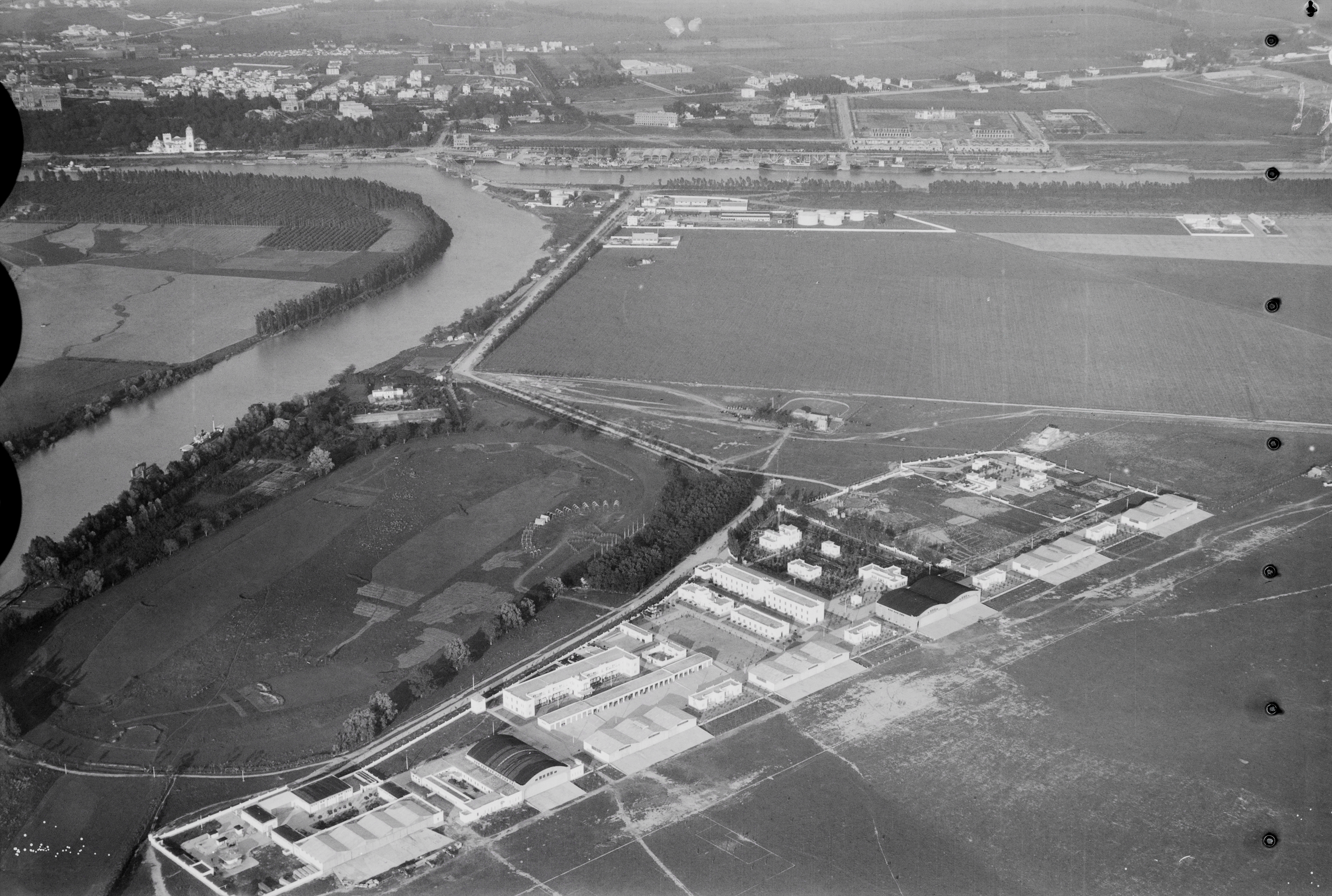
Tablada airbase

Around 1 AM the commander of Tablada air base, Rafael Martínez Esteve, with no combat surrendered to an approaching rebel detachment. Around 4 AM a group of Guardia Civil, during the day dispatched from Huelva to assist a column of Rio Tinto miners on their way to Seville, changed sides and joined the rebels. Soon after dawn at the outskirts of the city they engaged in combat against the militants; one of the trucks, loaded with dynamite, exploded. Some combat ensued for few hours, before the miners were overwhelmed. During the night the Falangists, detained during previous few days, were freed from prisons. A shaky connection with Cádiz, also seized by the rebels, has been established.

Around 9 AM Queipo appointed the Seville Comisión Gestora, including the new mayor of the city, and dismissed all municipal councillors; he also appointed new civil governors of the Seville and Huelva provinces, even though Huelva was controlled by the loyalists. During late morning hours irregular groups, composed mostly of members of right-wing militias and aided by some military, started incursions into the Gran Plaza district, located east to the centre and controlled by revolutionary workers. The rebels were well-armed and the loyalists were almost deprived of weapons; following some skirmishes, the area was seized by the evening. Meticulous house after house search followed; males deemed engaged in resistance were beaten, detained, or executed. The terror imposed was intended to be exemplary. Other districts, like Triana, Macarena and San Julián, were still controlled by the loyalists. Later in the evening the rebels deployed artillery pieces on banks of the Guadalquivir and started shelling Triana.

In towns and villages across Seville province the situation was chaotic bordering shambolic. In some locations, e.g. in Ecija (some 30,000 inhabitants, 80 km away), Guardia Civil commanders involved in the earlier conspiracy declared a state of war, deposed the mayor and proceeded to detain left-wing activists. In some locations, e.g. in Carmona (some 20,000 inhabitants, 30 km away), the Guardia remained loyal; when news about the coup in Seville reached the place, there were belligerent groupings of left-wing militants organized. They departed towards Seville to fight the rebels later in the day, though there is no news about any of them either reaching Seville or having any impact on the fighting. In some municipalities, e.g. in Osuna (some 20,000 inhabitants, 80 km away), Guardia Civil locked themselves in the station and awaited further developments.

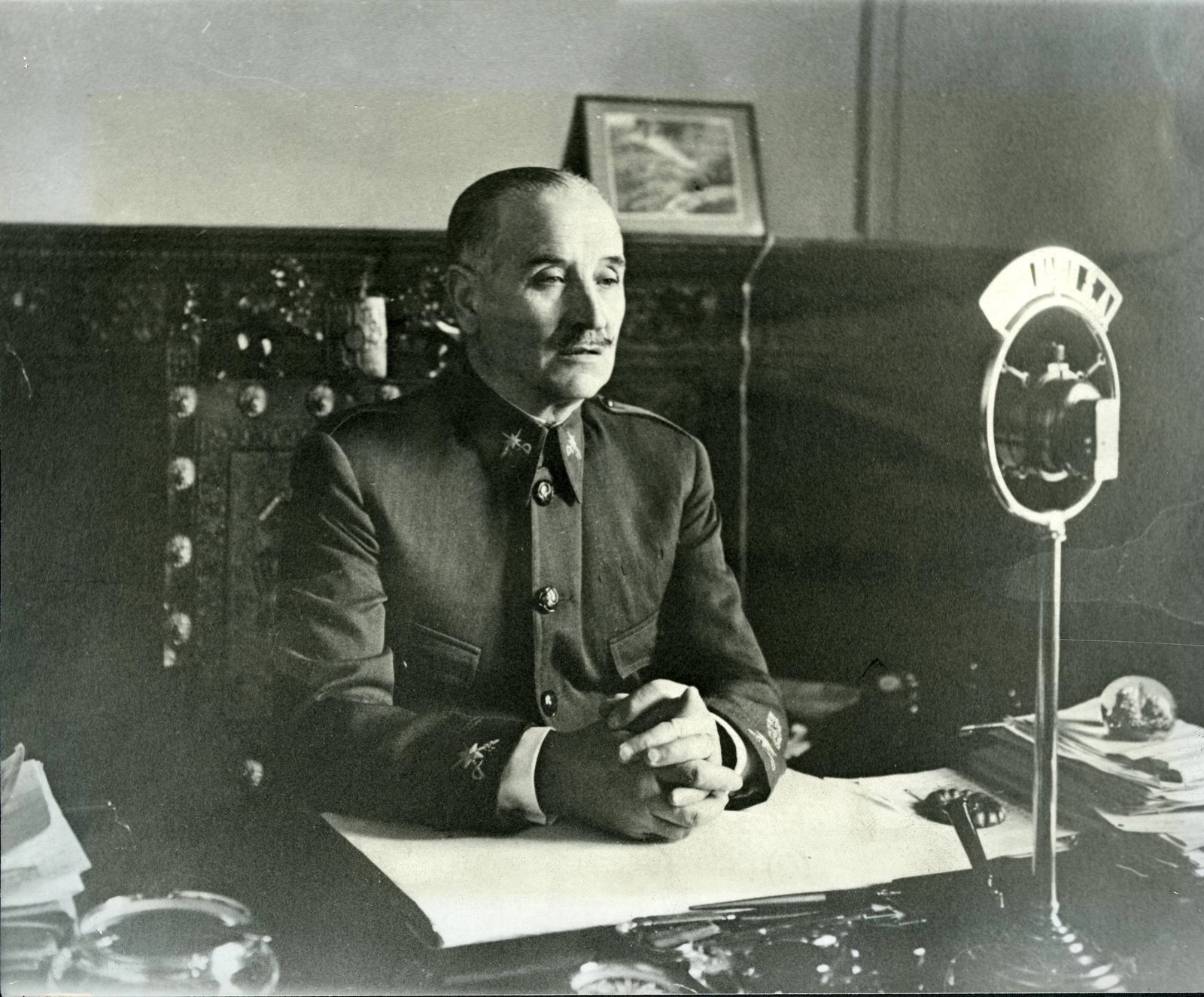
Queipo speaking over the radio

In the late afternoon 1. Tabor de Regulares de Ceuta no 3 reached Seville from Cádiz. At the same time first aircraft from Morocco landed at Tablada with some 20-30 soldiers of the Foreign Legion, commencing the great airlift operation which was to last for 3 months. On the other hand, in Madrid there was no government capable of taking action. The Martínez Barrio cabinet lasted only a few hours early in the day, while later the Giral government was overwhelmed by rebellion erupting across all Spain. As night fell, according to his later account, Queipo commanded some 4,000 men, though scholars believe this figure is understated. The rebels controlled a small territory between Seville and Cádiz; the insurgency appeared to have also triumphed in Córdoba (110 km away), Málaga (150 km) and Granada (210 km), but like the Seville-Cádiz pocket, they were isolated islands of insurgency. The neighboring provinces of Huelva, Badajóz, Jaén, Granada and partially Córdoba and Málaga were mostly controlled by the government.

=== 20 July ===
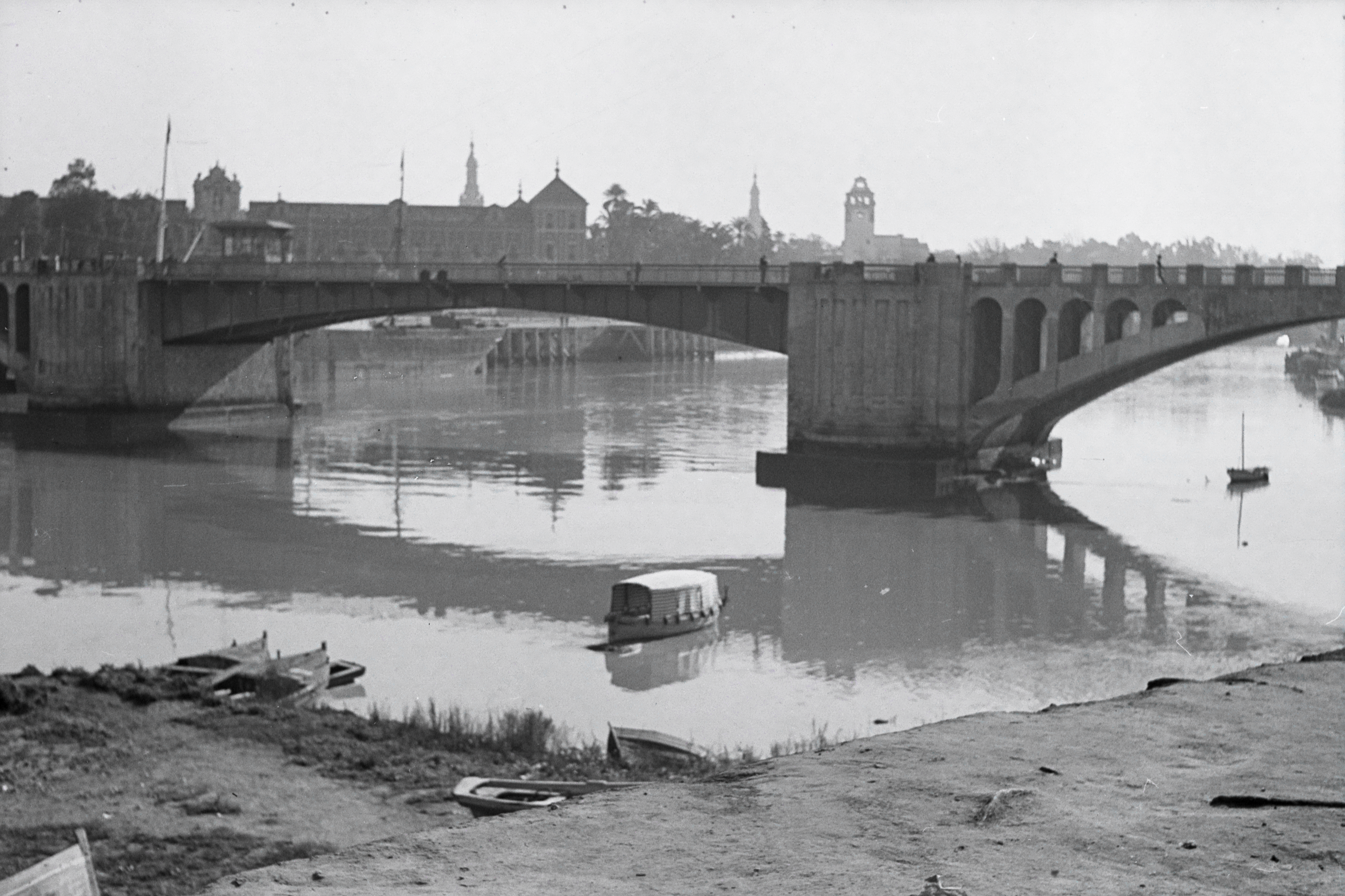
Puente San Telmo

During the morning hours the rebels gathered their units along the Guadalquivir, preparing for an advance on the district of Triana, located across the river; the troops were a rather loose mix of military, paramilitary and civilians. Unlike the case of the Gran Plaza, the borough was marked by fairly wide streets and parks, Triana was supposed to be more of a challenge; it was largely a maze of narrow streets, where the loyalists had already built a number of barricades. They had few firearms and it is estimated there was 1 rifle per 20 militants, with a severe shortage of ammunition; most weapons were improvised means, e.g. manufacturing tools. The assault commenced at Puente San Telmo and proceeded across the neighboring streets, but it soon got stuck. One advancing rebel group was almost encircled at Plaza de Altozano and it took reinforcements from across the river to get it withdrawn. Soon the entire advance was called off.

Throughout the day the situation across the province was getting only slightly clearer, with rebels apparently gradually getting the upper hand. In some locations the coup succeeded, e.g. Marchena (10,000 inhabitants, some 50 km away from Seville) was seized by a rebel Guardia Civil detachment sent from Ecija. In Osuna so far ambiguous Guardias left their barracks, dispersed the crowd, deposed authorities and declared a state of war. Communication with Cádiz, now fully controlled by the rebels, was already firm. However, there was no link with Córdoba, which remained an isolated island of insurgency; this was because Carmona, the city on the Seville-Córdoba road, was controlled by the loyalists. Also Utrera (25,000 inhabitants, 30 km away) remained a loyalist stronghold, effectively blocking access towards the stalemated Málaga.

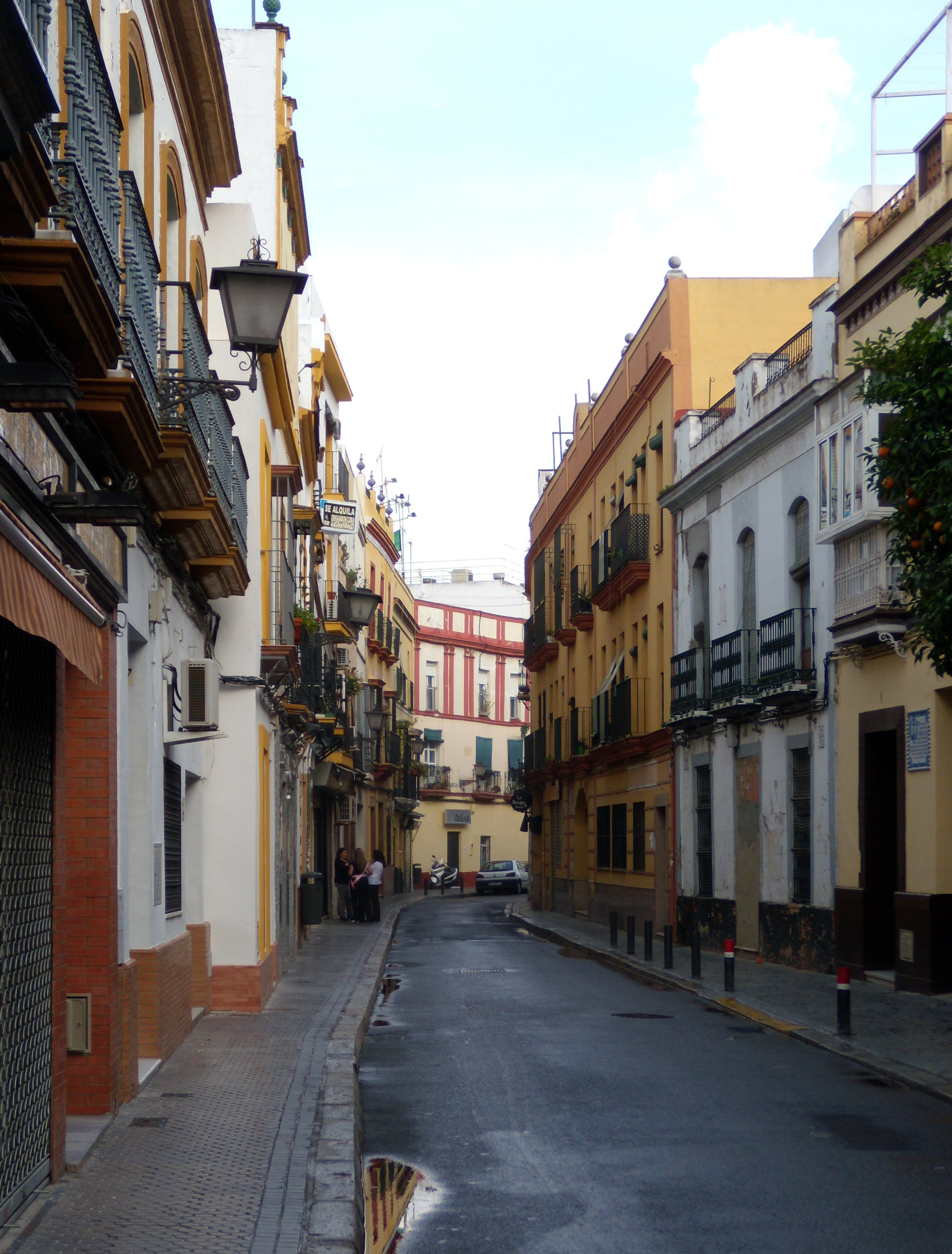
street in Triana district (current view)

Queipo proceeded with appointments to municipal, provincial and regional bodies, normally filled during an electoral process; he also declared himself commander of the II. Military Region and the Andalusian división orgánica. He appeared on the balcony during an improvised address to the crowd. Though earlier rebel troops used to shout vivas to the republic, not necessarily to deceive the loyalists, bicolor flags were flown from some of the buildings, including the official ones. In the centre of Seville some municipal services were resumed, and any attempts to stage a strike were immediately violently confronted. Left-wing newspapers were suppressed, while right-wing dailies like ABC went to print and on sale; they featured grand "Viva España" titles, printed orders from the military and hailed the patriotic action.

In the afternoon another attempt to seize the Triana district was launched. Again, the attackers were in some cases makeshift groups, like "Harca Berenguer" or "Columna Carranza", and in some organized units like the Seville Falangist centuria or a company from V. Bandera of the Foreign Legion. The officer in command was major Antonio Castejón from the Foreign Legion. This time the assault was more successful, the rebels destroyed a number of barricades and advanced deep into the district, though they took some losses mostly from sniper fire. However, they failed to seize Triana before dusk. As darkness came combat on sort of enemy territory was thought too risky and Castejón ordered a retreat; the district remained controlled by the revolutionaries.

=== 21 July ===
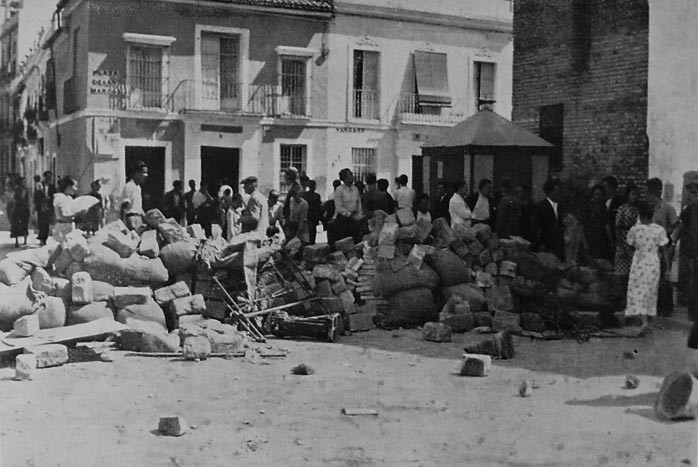
barricade at San Marcos, Macarena

During early morning hours rebel troops commenced a third attempt to capture Triana; it was preceded by blanket artillery shelling of the district and sniping fire from Paseo de Colón barracks across the river. Three groups advanced from Puente San Telmo, Puente de Triana, and Puente del Cachorro; again, they were a mix of civilians, Falangists, requetés, Regulares, assault guards, Foreign Legion and army infantry. Where possible, the tactics consisted of enveloping the enemy in selected quarters and closing in on isolated defenders; in such cases, they had little or no chance to withdraw, escape or hide and if they survived combat, were usually executed on the spot. Following a few hours the resistance ceased. Rebel militants started to comb the district, now covered in white flags, looking for those combatants who went into hiding or merely for trade union activists. Commanders reported harsh repressive means, which historians describe as a bloody punitive action.

Somewhat later, but also before mid-day, the rebels launched their first assault on the northern loyalist stronghold, the Macarena and San Julián districts. For 2 days it remained separated from the city centre along calle de Sol, San Julián, Arco de la Macarena, calle de Castellar, Ronda de Capuchinos, and calle de la Feria, protected also by ancient city walls. Its inhabitants focused largely on burning the churches; in the meantime, the PCE leader Manuel Delicado convinced the local Guardia de Asalto commander to hand out some 80 rifles. The assault was carried out by a cavalry squadron, which pierced the first line of barricades, reached Plaza San Marcos and advanced towards Asilo de San Luis; it hosted Junta Revolucionaria, the centre of defense. However, at some point the action went wrong; the commanding officer was killed with a pickaxe. The cavalry withdrew; later witnesses claimed to have seen the streets littered with dead horses. Apart from some rifles, a machine-gun was also captured by the loyalists.

Queipo issued another order, which confirmed the state of war on the territory of the entire province; apart from suspension of numerous civil liberties, it also criminalized any strike action and introduced a curfew. He introduced new harsh laws against looting and arson; he also announced a draft for all males in reserve "de los reemplazos de 1931 a 1935". Moreover, all workers "quedan militarizados" and under military jurisdiction. Tram circulation was partially resumed, while debris and other remnants of the fighting were being removed; all shops and markets were ordered to be opened as usual. The press kept hailing "movimiento libertador". People detained during previous days were moved from arrests and temporary incarceration points to prisons, though there were neither trials nor mass executions introduced at this stage yet.

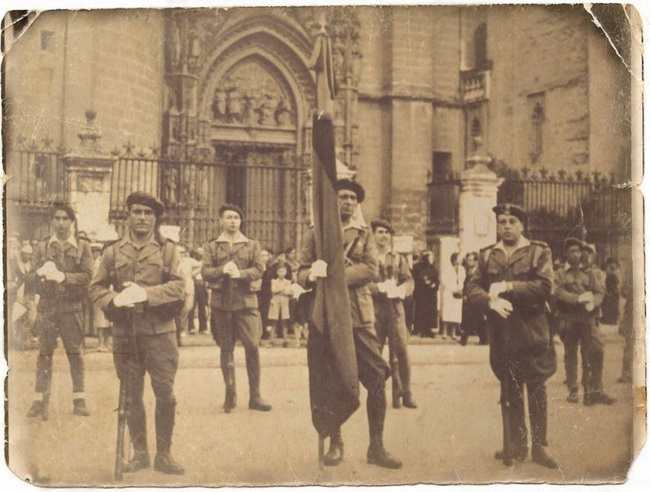
requeté in front of Seville cathedral

In Seville province the situation was getting clear, with the loyalists closed in isolated pockets and the rebels consolidating their control over most villages, towns and communication routes. Small detachments were either sent out from Seville to suffocate provincial islands of resistance, or they departed from other provincial rebel centers. Moroccan troops, who arrived earlier by sea at the port of Cádiz, were instantly deployed to quash provincial resistance, e.g. Carmona was taken by a company of regulares; at this point a shaky connection between Sevilla and Córdoba was established. Alcalá de Guadaira (20,000 inhabitants), a large suburban municipality only 15 km from the Giralda, was also overrun by Queipo troops, removing the only major pocket of resistance in the immediate vicinity of Seville.

=== 22 July ===
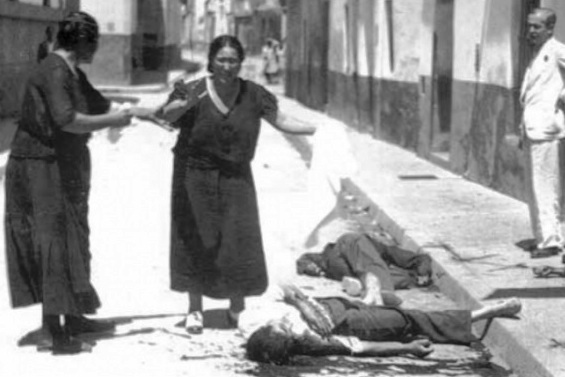
women lamenting dead, Seville

Throughout the morning hours the rebels were busy gathering and positioning troops supposed to seize Macarena and San Julián. This time, unlike during previous incursions into Triana and Macarena the day before, significant troops were massed: apart from the usual Falange Prima Linea volunteers, requetés, civilians of "Harca Berenguer" and "Columna Carranza", the Foreign Legion, Guardia Civil, and Guardia de Asalto, there were also regulares, army infantry, cavalry, artillery, engineering and even intendencia units deployed. Queipo later claimed he seized Macarena with 250 men, but historians rather suspect "thousands". The revolutionary defenders were as poorly armed as these from Triana; their informal leader was Andrés Palatín Ustriz, president of Junta Revolucionaria and in private the manager of Hospicio de San Luis.

The rebel artillery had already been shelling the district for some time. The assault commenced around 2 PM; it was spearheaded by sub-units from the V. Bandera of the Legion, again commanded by major Castejón and advancing from Arco de la Macarena. Another column attacked from Puerta de Córdoba, and another from calle Sol, at the junction between the Ronda de Capuchinos and calle Maria Auxiliadora. Similar tactics of isolating and enveloping pockets of resistance were employed, though unlike in Triana, there was heavy artillery fire and even aerial bombardment; some streets got partially ruined. As before, there were hardly any prisoners taken, and those surrendering were usually executed on the spot.

The plan was that three rebel columns converge on calle San Luis, near the Santa Marina church. Columns advancing from Arco and Puerta de Córdoba proceeded as planned, but the one from calle Sol having seized Plaza de los Terceros was then forced to withdraw. The column re-grouped and re-seized the plaza, only to be forced to abandon it again. A Guardia de Asalto armored vehicle arrived and finally the column reached Plaza San Marcos. The regulares suffered greatest losses in the triangle calle San Luis-Plaza de Pumarejo-calle Santa Maria, while the Foreign Legion soldiers were reported to have used women as human shields. In the afternoon hours all 3 columns converged, re-grouped and prepared for assault on the last loyalist redoubt, Hospicio San Luis.

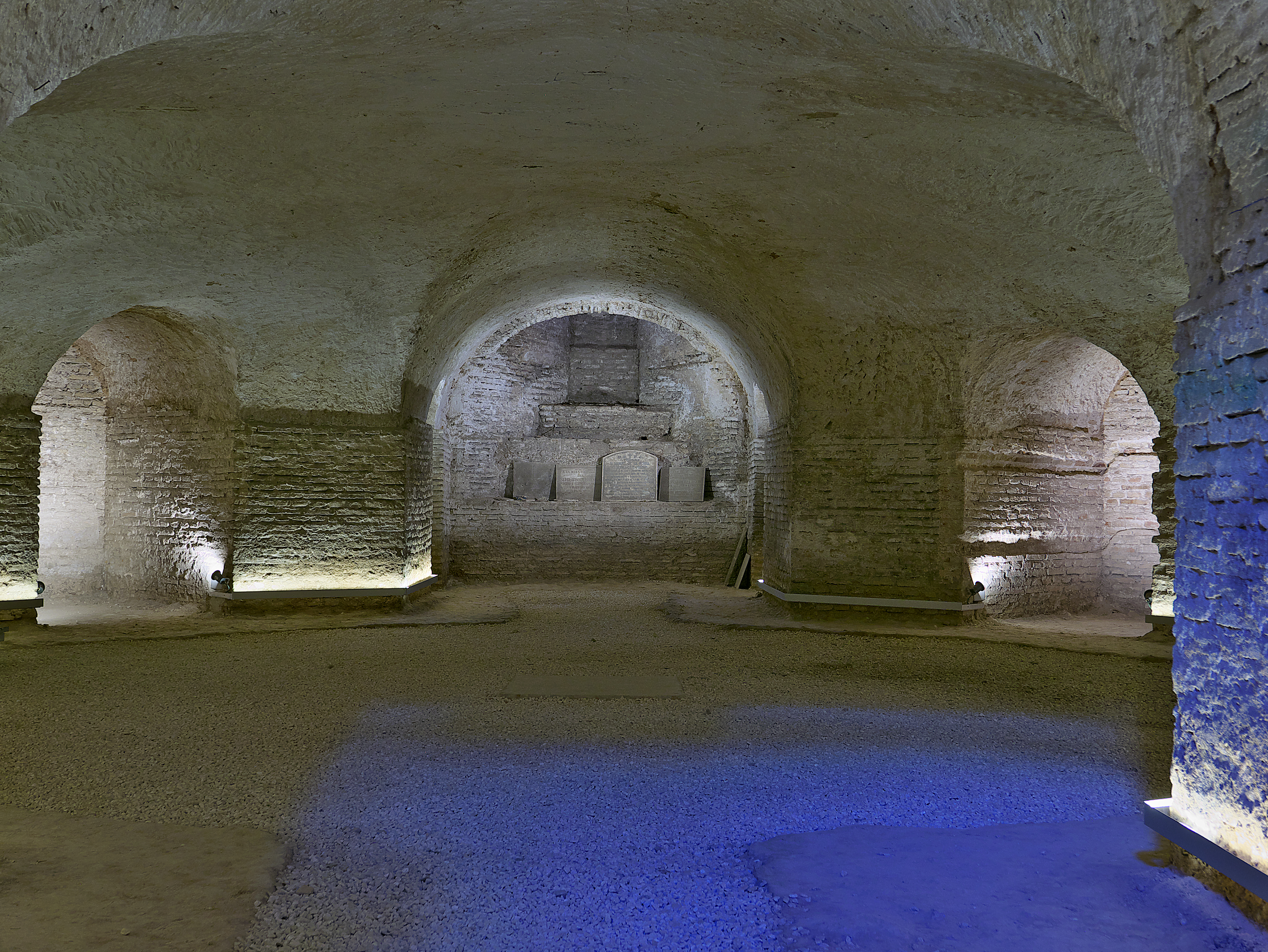
vaults at Hospicio San Luis, the last loyalist redoubt (current view)

The final attack was launched in late afternoon. There were also women and children on the premises; a present-day historian claims they were seeking refuge. Following close combat the Hospicio was seized. Palatín was executed when prisoner, though exact circumstances are not clear. According to some accounts the combat in Macarena and San Julián was ferocious; however, rebel troops sustained remarkably slim losses. They started combing the streets in search of males; those found with arms or suspected of having used them were shot on the spot, others might have been beaten or herded into custody; later there were some 300 prisoners paraded across the centre of Seville. In his radio charla this evening, Queipo declared that "el castigo ha sido ejemplar". When the night fell there was no pocket of resistance in the city; the coup in Seville was over.

== Aftermath ==
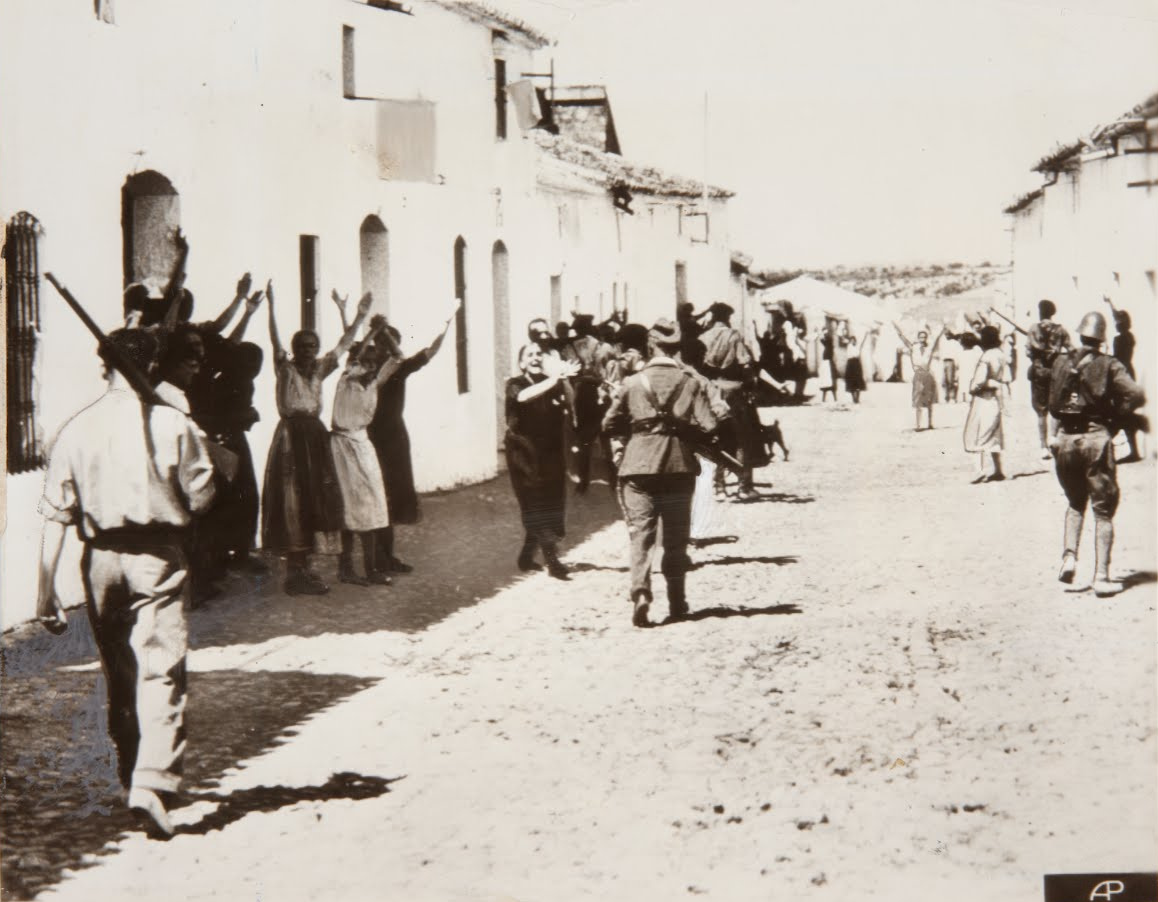
Constantina, women pleading with rebel troops for their men

During the following weeks the rebels (increasingly frequently called Nationalists) tried to stabilize their rule in the Andalusian enclave. Last remaining pockets of loyalist (increasingly frequently called Republican) resistance were suffocated, e.g. Utrera (25,000 inhabitants, 30 km away from Seville) fell on 26 July. Efforts were made to enlarge the enclave. They failed in the east, where following a brief stalemate Málaga was firmly seized by the Republicans, but were largely successful in the west, where the loyalist-held provincial capital of Huelva was captured on 27 July; the rebel territory now stretched to the friendly Portuguese frontier. In early August the enclave covered almost all provinces of Seville, Cádiz and Huelva, around a half of the Córdoba province and small parts of the Málaga province; it comprised around 30,000 km^{2}, some 7% of Spain. The closest town to Seville held by the loyalists was Lora del Río, some 50 km away from the Giralda. Until early August, when general Miaja commenced a campaign against Córdoba, the Republicans were not capable of mounting any offensive action. In mid-August the rebels established connection between Seville and so-far-isolated Granada.

Having gained full control, the rebels embarked on massive repressive campaign. Like the entire Nationalist terror elsewhere, in historiography it is interpreted in conflicting terms as a sweeping and organised genocide, selective operation against some social groups, overdone policing action basically intended to target specific individuals, wild sanguinary frenzy which went out of control, means of intimidating the population in seized and Republican territory, and others. The number of these executed during the coup is unknown and is probably close to a few hundred. The organised campaign of repression commenced with nomination of Manuel Díaz Criado as delegado de Orden Público in early August; in November 1936 at this post he was replaced by Santiago Garrigós. According to one scholar, there were 3,000 people shot in the province during first weeks after the coup, but another source indicates 3,028 anonymous corpses buried at the Seville cemetery between July 1936 and February 1937. In late 1938 the official document, prepared by provincial authorities for Jefatura Nacional de Seguridad, declared 7,983 people executed in the province up to date, but historians come out with the figure of 11,087 for the entire war; localities with the highest numbers were Seville (1,700), Constantina (990), Lora del Río (615), Arahal (420), Utrera (416), Carmona (381), Lebrija (361), and Villanueva Minas (307).

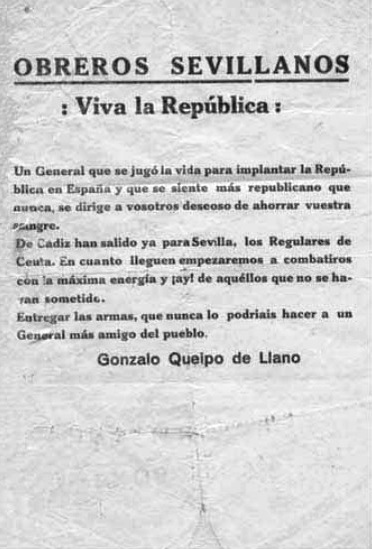
proclamation by Queipo

In terms of politics Queipo remained ambiguous. His harrangues focused on negative points of reference, like Bolshevism, criminal chaos, breakdown of order or sedition; the positive ones were patriotism, rule of law, hard work etc., all embodied in "movimiento salvador de España". It might have appeared that he acted in defense of the constitutional regime set up in 1931, e.g. on 22 July he declared that "the marxist conglomerate had deformed the character of the Republic". His first radio charlas ended with vivas to the republic and with the official republican anthem. However, he also ordered flying pre-1931 colors from public buildings. In his personal policy he preferred the military, though civilians appointed to various positions were usually representatives of generic conservative right. When building the propaganda narrative about his coup he focused – apart from himself – on the military, and did his best to marginalise or ignore the Falange and the Carlists, even though both organizations were allowed to send armed patrols across the streets, operate own structures and publish own press.

== Impact ==
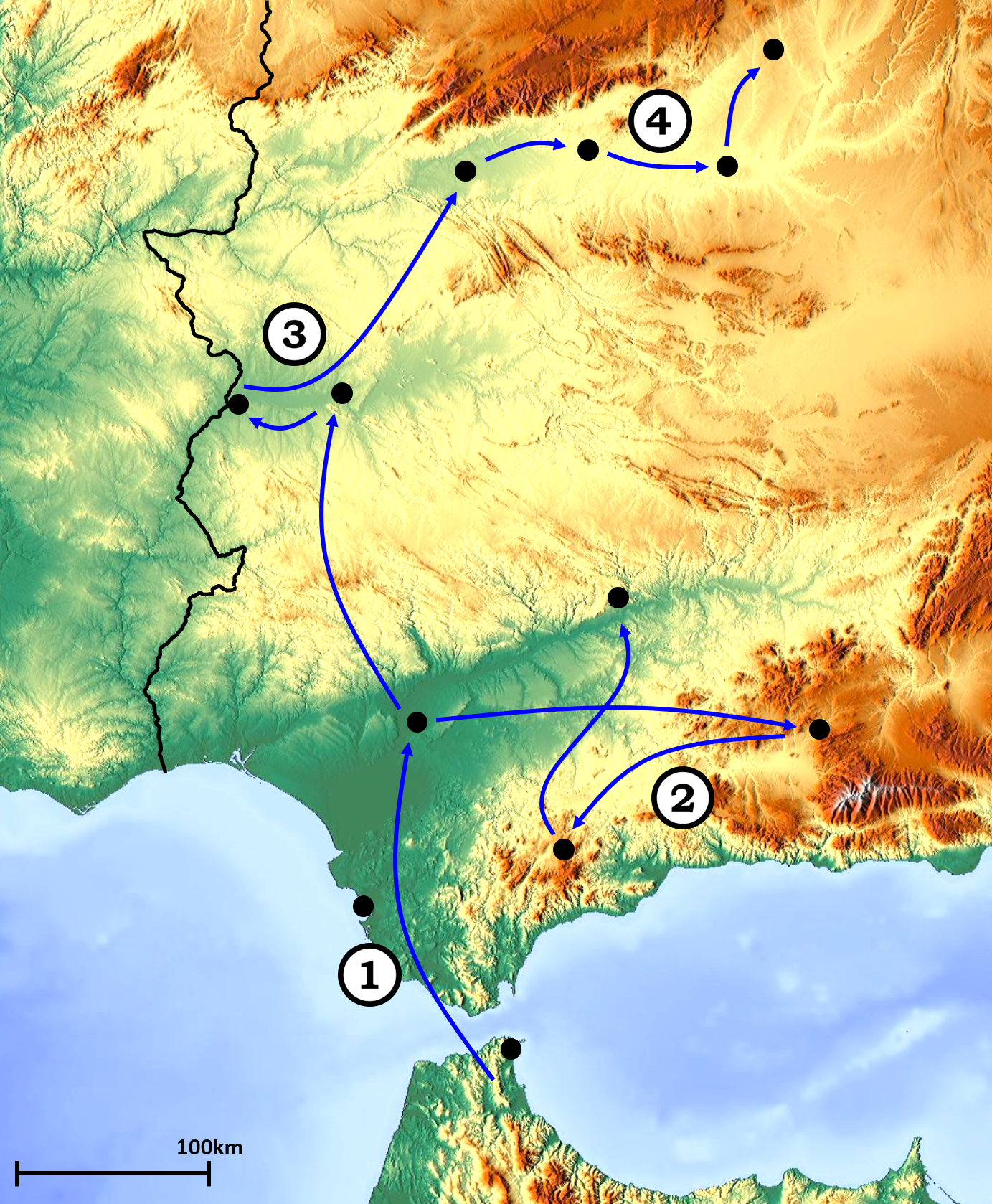
Seville as springboard for advance north

In terms of prestige and propaganda, the successful coup in the Andalusian capital was a major gain for the rebels nationwide. Though the territory controlled by insurgents in the south was a small isolated pocket compared to large part of the country seized in the north, Seville – ranked fourth in Spain in terms of population - was the largest urban center taken. However, strategic and logistic gains were by far more important. The Seville-centred pocket became crucial for transport of rebel troops from the Army of Africa to the peninsula; until the end of July there were some 1,000 battle-hardened elite troops shifted and until 5 August the figure grew to a few thousand, transported both by air and by sea. Apart from a brief moment in mid-August, when loyalist troops led by general Miaja approached Córdoba, the rebel control of the area was never challenged. In early August western Andalusia turned into a springboard for the Army of Africa advance across Extremadura, which in 3 months brought rebel troops to the gates of Madrid. The African units, transported to the west Andalusian pocket, played "un papel decisivo" during first months of what turned from a failed nationwide coup into a civil war.

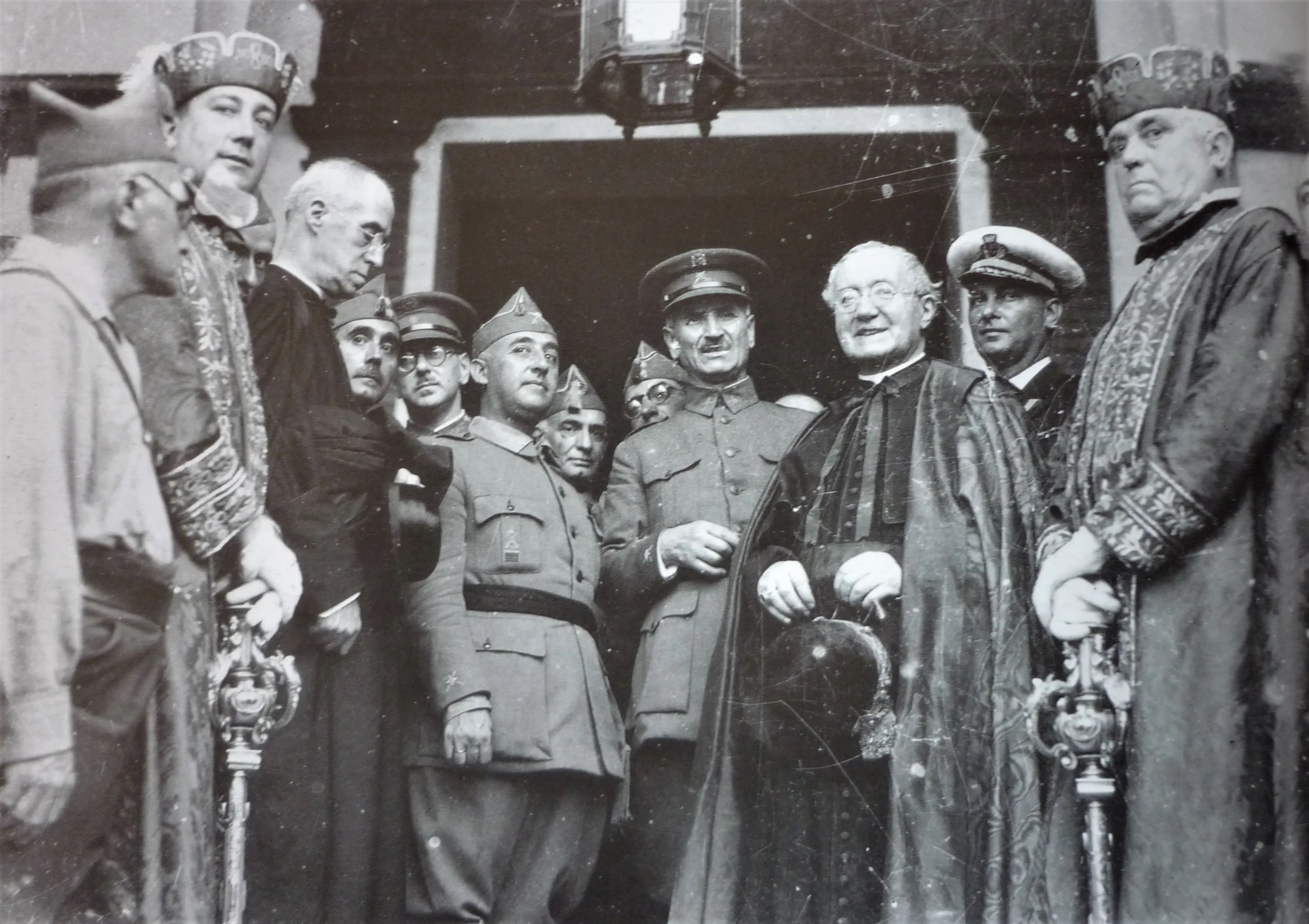
Franco and Queipo (center)

Though according to formal military ranking Queipo de Llano was the third highest officer in the conspiracy, due to his extravagant character and earlier political record his role among the conspirators was not prominent. The Seville coup elevated him amongst most outstanding figures of the insurgency; Sanjurjo perished in an air crash, Villegas, Goded and Fanjul were captured by the loyalists, Saliquet remained far from energetic, while the authority of Mola was seriously damaged when rebel troops in the north got stuck and were facing severe problems due to ammunition shortages. However, initially Queipo was not included in the first rebel executive, set up on 25 July, the Junta de Defensa Nacional; Queipo was incorporated only on 3 August. He became an unchallenged leader in the southern rebel zone, his role stretching far beyond that of a military commander; by contemporaries and by historians alike he was ironically dubbed a "viceroy". However, he did not command breakthrough combat units; key rebel formation, the Army of Africa, was led by Francisco Franco, who in few months got elevated to supreme Nationalist commander. The relation between the two was tense, yet Franco allowed Queipo much autonomy in the south, to marginalise him later.

== Epilogue ==
=== Rebels ===
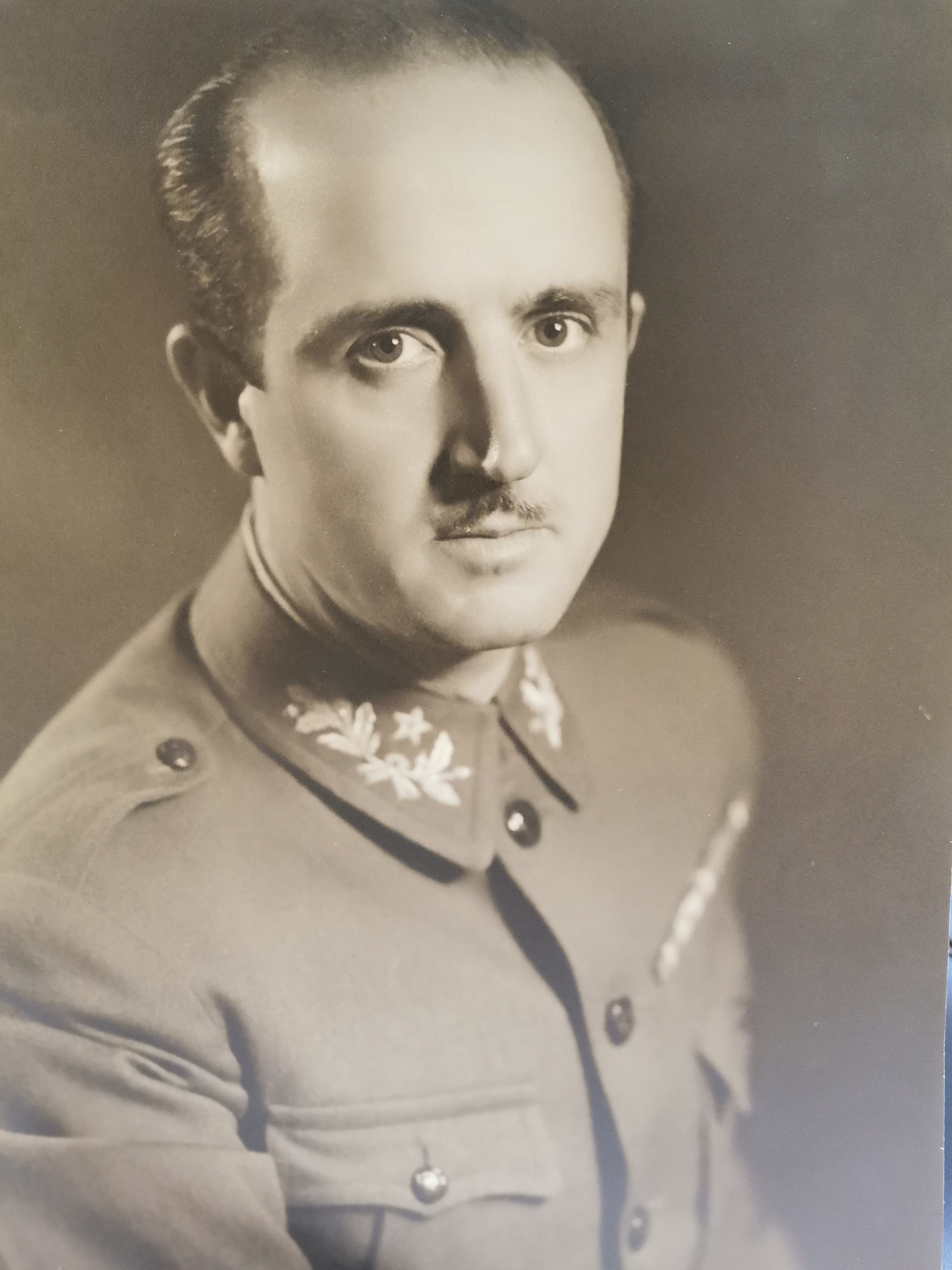
Escribano Aguirre

José García Carranza, former bullfighter turned Falange leader and Queipo's "ayudante civil", notorious for his role in post-coup repression, was killed in combat in December 1936. Pedro Parias González, military member of the conspiracy, appointed by Queipo the Seville civil governor, performed this role until his natural death in 1938. Antonio González Espinosa, the officer nominated the first president of Diputación Provincial, was later appointed the military governor of Sevilla and died as such in 1944. Manuel Díaz Criado, an officer entrusted by Queipo with gendarmerie tasks and later leading the post-coup repression, did not rise to major posts; as teniente coronel he died in 1947. They key rebel personality involved in the Seville coup, Gonzalo Queipo de Llano, remained the "vice-roy" of rebel Andalusia until the end of the war, though his relations with Franco deteriorated dramatically; in 1939 he was posted as an ambassador to Argentina, passed to reserve in 1945, remained deprived of any political power though was occasionally celebrated by propaganda, and died in 1952. Santiago Garrigos Bernabeu, the Guardia Civil commander, continued his career in this formation and reached at least the rank of teniente coronel; he died in 1964. Eduardo Álvarez Rementería, key conspirator and during the coup in informal rebel general staff, held various provincial high military and civil administration posts and was procurador in the Francoist Cortes; he died in 1965. Antonio Castejón Espinosa, the Foreign Legion major who led assaults on Triana, Macarena and San Julián, rose to teniente general and died in 1969, as gobernador civil of the Balearic Islands. José Cuesta Moreneo, leader of the conspiracy, rose to chief of staff of Army of the South, after the war served at various high military admin posts, in 1959 he became the chief of staff and died in 1981. Manuel Escribano Aguirre, member of the conspiracy triumvirate, gradually rose to general de brigada and in the 1960s served in the general staff; he died in 1984. Ramón de Carranza Gómez-Pablos, the Queipo-nominated alcalde of Seville and commander of "Columna Carranza", was a longtime procurador in the Cortes and longtime president of the Seville provincial diputación, though he is better known as president of Sevilla FC; he died in 1988. Manuel Gutiérrez Flores, another member of the triumvirate, as general de división became head of instruction department in the general staff; his fate after 1967 is unknown.

=== Loyalists ===
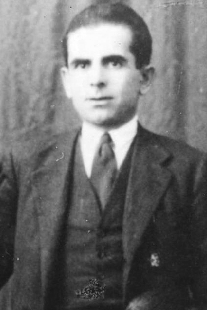
Barneto Atienza

José Loureiro Sellés, the Guardia de Asalto commander and the actual leader of loyalist troops during the coup, following his surrender was sentenced by a kangaroo court and executed in July 1936. José Manuel Puelles de los Santos, the president of Diputación Provincial, was executed in August 1936. Horacio Hermoso Araujo, the alcalde of Seville captured in his office on 18 July, was executed in September 1936. Santiago Mateo Fernández, a conservative monarchist, commander of the second strongest Seville unit regimiento de Caballería Taxdir N.º 7, who seemed disoriented during the shootout of 18 July, was executed in September 1936. Saturnino Barneto Atienza, a PCE leader who tried to convince Varela to hand out weapons to the militias, managed to escape from the civil government building, made it to the Republican zone, left Spain in 1939 and perished in Moscow in 1940. General Julián López Viota, commander of the artillery brigade who refused to join the rebels when confronted by Queipo, was arrested and moved to reserve, he died in 1944. The loyalist military commander of the II. Military Region, general José Villa-Abrille, was expelled from the army and sentenced to 6 years in prison; released in mid-1940s, he died in 1945. Manuel Allanegui Lusarreta, an officer less than enthusiastic about the Republic and commander of the infantry regiment, who surprised by Queipo stuck to military discipline and refused to join the unfolding coup, was sentenced, imprisoned and then released; he died in Sevilla in 1958. Rafael Martínez Esteve, commander of the Tablada airport, was condemned to death but got his sentenced reversed to incarceration; released at unclear date, he died in Madrid in 1965. Manuel Delicado Muñoz, another Seville PCE leader who tried to lead the revolutionaries in Macarena, avoided capture; he crossed to the Republican zone, served as director in one of the Agriculture Ministry departments, left Spain in 1939 and went on exile, returned in 1976 and died in Seville in 1980. The loyalist civil governor, José Maria Varela Rendueles, was sentenced to death but got his sentence commuted to 30 years in prison. It is not clear when he was released; he settled in La Coruña, in 1982 he published a book on the Seville coup and died in 1986. Juan Cantero Ortega, the regional chief of staff who on summer leave adopted a wait-and-see policy, was demoted when reported back on duty; his later fate is unknown.

== In historiography ==
Almost immediately after seizing power in the centre of Seville Queipo embarked on the propaganda campaign of self-exaltation; he maintained and cultivated it until deposed and sent to Argentina in mid-1939. He claimed to have taken control of the fourth largest city in Spain, with a garrison of 7,000 people, with just 130 soldaditos, all thanks to his own decisiveness, bravery, and wit. Franco initially endorsed this myth, though later he did not tolerate adulation of any Nationalist leader except himself and there was even a period in the 1940s when a total media blackout was imposed upon Queipo. The latter was getting increasingly bitter about what he perceived as marginalisation of his role in the official historiographic Francoist narrative, in 1950 exchanging angry letters with the caudillo. However, both Franco-centred and Queipo-centred visions coincided in their claims that Seville was a dangerous hotbed of marxist revolutionaries and the coup prevented the city from falling into hands of the red homegrown bolsheviks. This version, with varying degrees of emphasis put on the personal achievements of Queipo, survived Francoism, and was maintained until the 1990s.

In academic historiography it is often maintained that the coup in Seville succeeded largely thanks to Queipo, having been "combinación entre audacia y bluff", "audaz golpe de mano" and "the greatest initial achievement by any of the rebel leaders". In terms of importance for the rebels, it was the "revolt’s most crucial and audacious single operation"; first because it produced the seizure of a radical left-wing stronghold, very much an Anarchist fortress, and second because it resulted in control of the strategic spot on the map of Spain, which in turn enabled bringing the Army of Africa to the peninsula and then advancing across Extremadura and New Castile towards Madrid. However, recently the historiographic focus shifted from the personality of Queipo towards the well-developed conspiracy network, operational in Seville since the spring of 1936. Some historians are principally concerned about dismantling what they perceive as the myth of Queipo; their objective is to prove that the likes of Cuesta Moreneo left only the final touches to the extravagant general, while indecision and ineptitude of local commanders like Villa-Abrille were among key other factors. Last but not least, since earlier works of Gerald Brenan and Gabriel Jackson there is growing focus on repression, and Queipo is increasingly frequently pictured as an eccentric, psychopathic sadist.

== See also ==
- Gonzalo Queipo de Llano
- José Fernández de Villa-Abrille
