= José Fernández de Villa-Abrille =

Spanish general

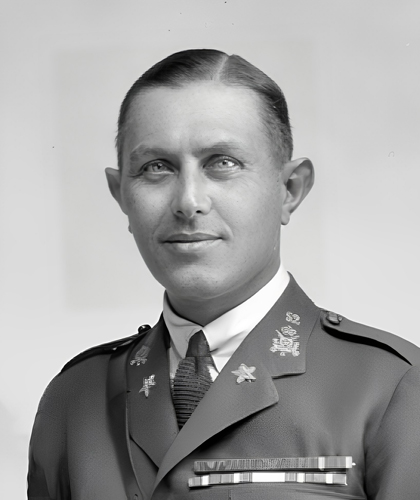
Image of José Fernández de Villa-Abrille

José Fernández de Villa-Abrille y Calivara (1878 – Madrid, 1946) was a Spanish general in charge of the Seville garrison who capitulated to rebel forces at the beginning of the Spanish Civil War.

== Life ==
Fernández de Villa-Abrille was head of the II Organic Division of the army, based in Seville and in command in Andalusia, at the time of the July 1936 coup that led to the Civil War. He was aware of the conspiracy of the Nationalist rebels some time before their uprising. Thus, when the Commander of the General Staff, José Cuesta Monereo - following instructions from the rebel general, Gonzalo Queipo de Llano - drew up a plan with which 4,000 men were mobilized to carry out and consolidate the coup in the province of Seville, General Fernández de Villa-Abrille did not join the uprising. In April, Queipo de Llano had visited the general - who was an old friend - to ask for his support in a coup but the request was rejected. Despite the visit, Fernández de Villa-Abrille insisted to local and national Republicans that there was no rebel activity in his garrison. On 7 June, all commanding officers swore allegiance to the Republic before Mariano Ruiz Funez, the minister for agriculture, when he visited Seville. The civil governor, José María Varela Renduelez, spoke to Fernández de Villa-Abrille about reported links between soldiers in the garrison and local right-wing extremists, but the connections were firmly rejected; moreover he failed to tell Varela when Queipo de Llano visited again in early July or that he had turned down repeated requests to visit Queipo de Llano who was staying nearby. Neither he nor many of the officers under his command showed any resistance to the coup, nor to the repressive actions that Commander Antonio Castejón Espinosa initiated in different neighborhoods of Seville.

General Fernández ignored the instructions of Varela to respond to the rebels. In the morning of 18 July, Queipo de Llano, accompanied by a few officers, walked uninvited into his office and demanded to know whether he supported the Republic or the Nationalists. The general wavered, and despite his passivity and that of several commanders under his orders, the senior staff of the II Organic Division was arrested and prosecuted. Fernández de Villa-Abrille - whose position as head of the II Organic Division was de facto held by Queipo - was also arrested and personally threatened by Queipo de Llano. Many of the soldiers under his command in Seville took part in the rebel uprising. He was discharged from the army in December 1936; and in February 1939, a Nationalist court martial sentenced him to six years in prison. He finished serving his sentence in Seville, in a villa near Cruz del Campo, which was used as a military prison during the war and afterwards. Shortly after his release, he died in 1946 in a Madrid pension.
