= Gonzalo Queipo de Llano =

Spanish general (1875–1951)

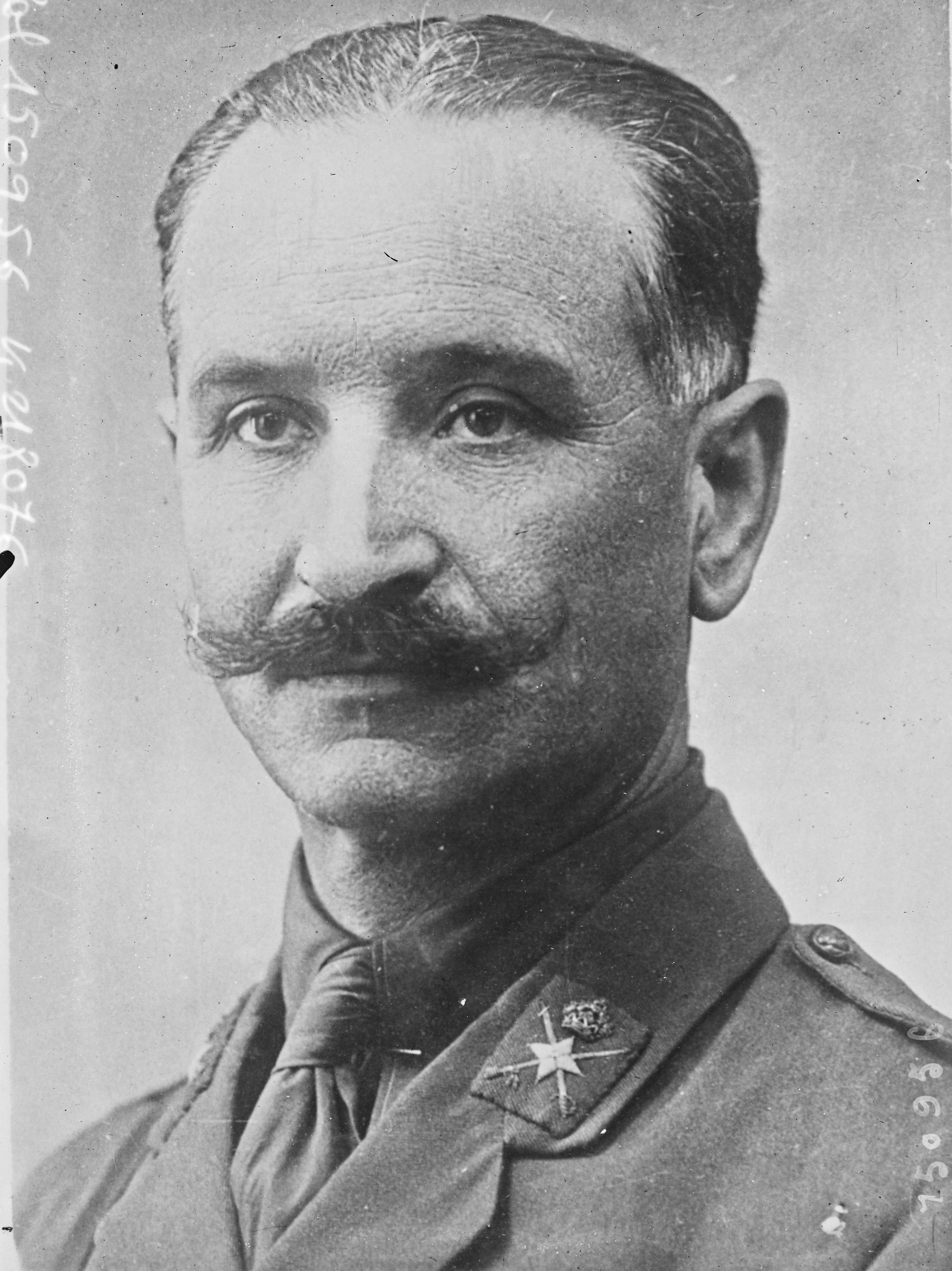
- Born: 5 February 1875; Tordesillas, Kingdom of Spain
- Died: 9 March 1951 (aged 76); Camas, Seville, Spanish State
- Burial place: presently undisclosed, formerly La Macarena Basilica, Seville; 37.402525°N 5.989407°W
- Military career
- Allegiance: Kingdom of Spain (1896–1931); Spanish Republic (1931–1936); Francoist Spain (1936–1951)
- Branch: Spanish Army
- Service years: 1896–1939
- Rank: Captain General
- Commands: Nationalist Army of the South; Captain General of Andalusia; División General of Madrid
- Conflicts: Cuban War of Independence; Spanish–American War; Rif War; Spanish Civil War
- Awards: Laureate Cross of Saint Ferdinand (Grand Cross); Order of Military Merit (Grand Cross)

Gonzalo Queipo de Llano y Sierra (5 February 1875 – 9 March 1951) was a Spanish Army general. He distinguished himself quickly in his career, fighting in Cuba and Morocco, later becoming outspoken about military and political figures which led to his imprisonment, removal from posts and involvement in plots against Spanish governments. He was a Nationalist military leader during the Spanish Civil War under Francisco Franco, gaining the soubriquet "El general de la radio" ("radio" or "broadcasting general" in English media) for his threats and explicitness on air. Under his control of southern Spain, tens of thousands of Spaniards perished as part of the Nationalists' White Terror. In his post-war roles he was effectively sidelined by Franco.

== Biography ==
=== Early years ===
He was born in Tordesillas, to María de las Mercedes Sierra y Vázquez de Novoa and Gonzalo Queipo de Llano y Sánchez. His father was the municipality's judge. He had seven siblings. At the age of 14, he was enrolled in a seminary, but he ran away four months later and hid in the house of his aunt in El Ferrol. After completing the Instituto de Ponferrada entrance exam, he excelled in courses there, also studying at the diocesan seminary. In 1891, he joined the 4.º Batallón de Artillería de Plaza in Ferrol as a trumpet player. Aged 18, he became an artilleryman and enrolled at the Academia de Caballería de Valladolid in 1893 along with Santiago Mateo Fernández (whom he later arrested and executed).

=== Cuba ===
In February 1896, he graduated and was promoted to 2nd Lieutenant in the Regimiento de Dragones de Santiago, Granada. He requested a transfer to Cuba, arriving in Havana in August and joining battle in the Regimiento de Caballería Pizarro. For bravery, he was promoted to 1st lieutenant in October. In 1897, with the Regimiento Expedicionario del Príncipe, he was made captain for numerous actions. The following year he received the Orden militar de María Cristina, Spain's second-highest wartime medal, amongst his other awards. He left Cuba in October for the Regimiento de Reserva de Valladolid.

=== Spain, Morocco and Argentina ===
There followed many transfers and reposts: in December 1900, he joined Regimiento de Lanceros de Villaviciosa (Jerez de la Frontera); four months later he was in the Lanceros de Borbón (Salamanca); then the Farnesio Lancers in Valladolid, where he lived with his mother. He married Genoveva Martí y Tovar, daughter of a judge, on 4 October 1901. The next October, he was with the Regimiento de Lanceros de la Reina in Alcalá de Henares. There he received the Orden Civil de Beneficencia for saving a soldier from drowning. In November 1909, his unit moved against Rifian tribesmen after the Barranco del Lobo 'disaster'. The following year, his (anonymous) criticisms of the Ministry of War were discussed in parliament; he organised an officer's demonstration leading to two months in gaol. After nearly a year's leave in Argentina, where he studied horse breeding, he was promoted to commander in 1911. In 1912, he was in Albacete before joining the Regimiento de Cazadores de Vitoria (Granada) leaving for Ksar el-Kebir to command three squadrons (this part of Morocco became a Spanish protectorate that year) then a Larache cavalry group in 1913 - through which he gained another María Cristina cross - promotion to lieutenant colonel (1914) and placement in charge of a military court (1916). Illness forced his convalescence in Madrid. Upon recovery in February 1917, he was posted to Córdoba then requested leave to Ávila.

Returning in 1918, he joined the Regimiento de Húsares de Pavía, the Depósito de Reserva de Lugo in Alcalá de Henares - becoming a colonel - then returning to the Lanceros de la Reina. In December 1922, Niceto Alcalá-Zamora made him brigadier general and 2nd commander in Ceuta. In 1923 and 1924 his units policed the Ghomara resistance. He antagonised the Moroccan Directorate so general Miguel Primo de Rivera transferred him to the military government of Cádiz; general José Aizpuru Martín-Pinillos, high commissioner in Morocco, demanded his return to take charge of the Ceuta Zone and lead a column around Tétouan. With Franco (then a lieutenant colonel) he published La Revista de Tropas Coloniales; he edited the first half-dozen, writing critical comments of Primo de Rivera who removed him in September 1924 and gaoled him for a month at Ferrol. His later involvement with the Comité Militar Revolucionario saw him transferred to the III Brigada de Caballería. He formed the Asociación Militar Republicana with general Eduardo López Ochoa so was recalled to Madrid in July 1926. In 1928, general Severiano Martínez Anido sent him to languish in the army reserves.

In 1930, Queipo de Llano was punched by José Antonio Primo de Rivera, with the two getting into a fight that was stopped by police. The incident occurred at the Lyon d'Or café in the Calle Alcalá and resulted in Primo de Rivera being dishonourably discharged following a court-martial. At the time, it led to increased right-wing suspicions of Queipo de Llano.

Queipo de Llano had written a defamatory letter against an uncle of José Antonio and against the Dictator himself. José Antonio, ready to defend the honour of his family abused by the Republican general, went to the café where the latter used to socialize, and after asking whether he was the author of the writing, and after receiving the general's affirmative reply, delivered a spectacular punch that made the general roll on the floor, sparking a free-for-all between the companions of José Antonio and the companions of the general.

He took part in José Sánchez-Guerra y Martínez's failed coup on 15 December 1930, taking over the Cuatro Vientos aerodrome with Ramón Franco. He proclaimed a republic over the radio while his co-conspirator took a plane to leaflet Madrid and bomb the royal palace. The plans fell apart due to a lack of union support so Ramon Franco flew back to Cuatro Vientos and Queipo de Llano and others joined him in the escape to Portugal, whence they journeyed to France as exiles. In February 1931, his discharge was ordered because of his absence. He returned on 14 April when Manuel Azaña's republic was declared and was promoted to division general, leading the Madrid-based 1.ª División Orgánica and becoming head of the Inspección General del Ejército. Niceto Alcalá-Zamora placed him in charge of his military quarter, a post he lost in March 1933. In September, with Alejandro Lerroux as prime minister, he was made inspector general de Carabineros a post he also lost soon after but regained in February 1935 after his daughter married the president's son.

=== The Civil War ===
After the victory of the Frente Popular, General Mola included Queipo de Llano in his coup plot despite the latter's previous opposition to Primo de Rivera and association with republicans. Others also persuaded him to join. Mola sent him to look at overcoming local reluctance in Seville to another coup after the debacle of the 1932 Sanjurjada and its poor consequences for army officers. He reported back confidently. In early July, he went to Granada and Málaga then Seville and Huelva, to encourage hesitant officers. General José Fernández de Villa-Abrille refused to meet him. On 18 July, he arrested Villa-Abrille and persuaded enough junior officers in the Regimiento de Infantería n.º 6 to revolt, arresting Colonel Manuel Allanegri and his old classmate, Santiago Mateo, colonel of the Regimiento de Caballería (who at his trial was defended by his son - a Queipo de Llano supporter - before execution). He gained control of the División Orgánica n.º 2 and Regimiento de Artillería Ligera n.º 3. Of the remaining units in Andalucia, only the commanders in Cádiz - a crucial port - and Córdoba would support him initially. The murder and torture of opponents by the Falange began immediately. Plans went ahead to secure Seville. The local Guardia de Asalto (Assault Guard) resisted around the town hall but was well beaten that day by the coup rebels. In the evening, having captured the radio station Unión Radio Sevilla, Queipo de Llano declared martial law, making the first of his terror-filled propaganda broadcasts, declaring his control of Seville, commencing a series of doom-laden edicts, announcing the arrival of Moroccan troops and the rebels' control of other cities - including Madrid, one of many fabrications to come.

On 20 July, the first troops of the regulares (Moroccan mercenaries) and legionarios (foreign legion) flew in from Tétouan to the captured airport. Over two nights, three columns of about 100 troops led by experienced commanders from Africa, supported by Falangists and Carlist Requetés, systematically crushed any resistance in poorer western and northern parts of Seville with artillery and then firearms. Human shields were used by Nationalists but there were very few weapons against them. On 22 July, aircraft joined with shooting and bombing. More African-based troops arrived, as did Franco at the beginning of August, beginning the advance to Madrid. Between July and the following January about 3000 people were killed in Seville. Queipo de Llano's regular ribald broadcasts and his interviews were a key feature of Nationalist communications, bringing him fame. Often drinking alcohol (despite serious liver damage), he encouraged brutality, for example announcing to troops, "I authorise you to kill like a dog anyone who dares oppose you." He made up events avidly as he spoke, lauding Nationalist advances, detailing enemy atrocities, the rape and murder of young children and promising grim consequences to combatants and their families including sexual threats against women from his own forces - such words were removed for the printed record to make the speeches more palatable and major José Cuesta Monereo gave instructions to that effect in September, also wary of negativity abroad.

On 12 August 1936, Franco made him inspector general de Carabineros, chief of the 2.ª División Orgánica and a member of the Junta de Defensa Nacional. The area around Seville and Huelva was overcome and united with the rebel centres of Granada and Córdoba by September. He ignored warnings about the excesses of his commanders, and even requests of leniency from Mola and Franco for arrested commanders who were their friends but who were executed anyway. One of Queipo de Llano's appointments, captain Manuel Díaz Criado, with a history of sedition and murder who accepted his victims' sexual bribes, gravely insulted the Portuguese ambassador, a Nationalist ally. Franco ordered his removal and told Queipo de Llano to apologise. Torture, unfettered rapes, murders and massacres were committed by Nationalist forces (as allowed by commanders in North Africa) and justified by Queipo de Llano. Corpses were publicly displayed to terrorise; body parts were frequently cut off, following a grim tradition from Spanish Morocco (international journalists were offered such souvenirs).

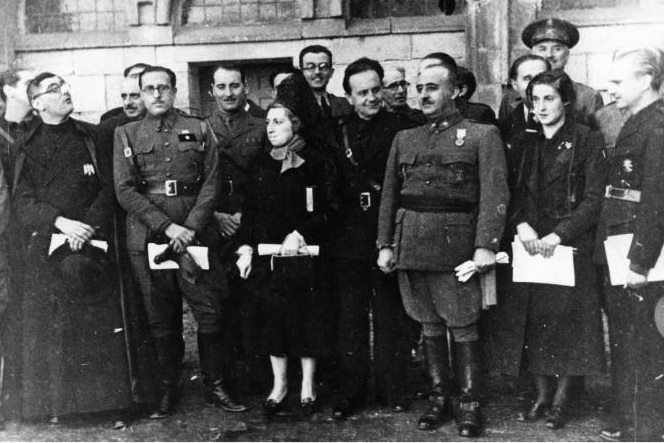
Gonzalo Queipo de Llano with other Falange leaders (back row in peaked officer cap)

On 15 August in Badajoz, following a fierce battle and mass public executions in the bull ring, Portuguese and French journalists were stunned by the smell and sight of piles of burnt bodies in the cemetery shown to them by their guide, a local priest, who said "They deserved this." Following this, Franco told Queipo de Llano to exercise strict control over all photographers. Queipo de Llano and others supported Franco as generalissimo and he became their head of state on 1 October. On 12 December, Franco created three large army units, including the Army of the South led by Queipo de Llano. A brutal Spanish-Italian attack crushed republican resistance in and around Málaga; thousands of refugee families continued to be shelled as they fled, in what became known as the Desbandá. In 1937, the southern Army worked with General Andrés Saliquet's Army of the Centre. Tens of thousands were killed in the area dominated by Queipo de Llano during the war and a similar number imprisoned. The coup in Seville, actually planned by major Cuesta Monereo, was claimed by Queipo de Llano as proof of his own mastery, bragging that he'd taken Seville with just 145 troops and civilians; broadcasting in early 1938, he reduced the number to fifteen men fighting against one hundred thousand communists. With the south secure, his essentially independent governance of the region led to further disputes with Franco and locally.

Always something of an outcast for his coarseness, jibes and republican sympathies, he had not been made part of the cabinet after the National Council was formed and was bitter about Falangists in positions of control. He'd demonstrated some skill in the administration of industry and agriculture in Andalucia - if wholly in favour of Nationalist supporters - but his control was steadily weakened.

=== Post-war isolation ===
At the war's end in May 1939, Franco promoted him to lieutenant general. He asked for, but did not receive, the gran cruz laureada de San Fernando, Spain's highest military honour, but the city of Valladolid was given the award, not his base of Seville. On 20 July, he criticised Franco, who duly removed him as chief of the Carabineros and the 2.ª División Orgánica, splitting up the latter for security. His late expression of support for Franco curried no favour. Franco posted him to Italy, making him 'president' of a Misión Militar Especial, a role with little purpose, and then as an attaché. General José Enrique Varela, the Minister of the Army, awarded him la Medalla Militar for his Civil War role, but he repeated his request for the San Fernando cross and asked to leave his post for health reasons. He was eventually allowed to visit his daughter in 1941 before her emigration to Argentina and was allowed two months' medical leave in Madrid in January 1942. There, his snipes at Franco and the Falange were monitored - Varela sent him back to Italy. A medical certificate proved his poor health; he was allowed back in June but a decree forced his residence in Málaga, relieved of all posts. In 1943, he was transferred to the army reserves but not appointed to Franco's Cortes Españolas like other former generals. Significantly, he didn't support the restoration of the monarchy. Franco finally gave him the San Fernando cross but only for the first nine days of the Civil War.

In April 1950, Franco made him marqués de Queipo de Llano; his response contained a barb about its perceived value for his heirs. In March 1951, he died in his farmhouse in Garmbogaz, Camas, Seville after months of deteriorating health. His remains were placed in la basílica de la Macarena and its brotherhood made him an honorary member posthumously for supporting building work on the basilica.

== Legacy ==
In 2008, judge Baltasar Garzón of the Audiencia Nacional (National Court) formally accused him [and his contemporaries] of illegal detention and crimes against humanity. In 2009, the Macarena brotherhood removed Civil War references from his tomb, replacing them with "brother". In November 2022, according to la Ley 20/2022 de Memoria Democrática (Law of Democratic Memory), his remains and those of his wife and his "right hand man" - Francisco Bohórquez Vecina - were disinterred by the brotherhood, cremated at Alcalá de Guadaíra and the remains returned to the families.

== In the media ==
The historical podcast In Search of Lost Crime made an episode on Queipo de Llano's execution of Andalusian nationalist Blas Infante and Queipo de Llano's complicated relationship with Francisco Franco.

== See also ==
- Carabineros

Spanish nobility
New creation	Marquis of Queipo de Llano; 1 April 1950 – 9 March 1951	Succeeded by Gonzalo Queipo de Llano y Martí
