= Manuel Díaz Criado =

Manuel Díaz Criado (1898 – 7 July 1947) was a Spanish infantry officer. With a reputation as a brutal sadist, he was during the Spanish Civil War responsible for the arrest, sexual abuse, torture and execution of thousands of people in the regions of Andalucia and Extremadura who opposed the Nationalist military uprising. The crimes frequently extended to the relatives and the associates of those targeted.

== Early life and career ==
He was born in Seville and was the eldest of five children of Manuel Díaz Gavira, a civil administrative chief. He joined the army and was posted to the Spanish Legion in the Spanish protectorate in Morocco. In 1925, he was promoted to captain. Already for his bullying nature, he gained the nickname Criadillas ('bull's balls'). He associated with right-wing elements trying to subvert left-wing officials associated with the Spanish Second Republic. After the spread of revolutionary strikes across Spain in 1931, the civil governor of Seville, José Bastos Ansart, was concerned about local state order being overwhelmed and instigated a paramilitary force, the Guardia Civica, made up of members of local landowners' clubs. After arms were collected, Diaz Criado led the force, and four prisoners who had been taken in the Parque de María Luisa were shot dead with the cover of the Ley de fugas. The law that allowed prisoners to be shot while they escaped, and its ramifications were long-lasting.

On 15 August, he survived a serious car accident. Wanted by the authorities, he was hidden by a female prostitute, Doña Mariquita, who later recalled the favour when she was persuaded by relatives of Diaz Criado's prisoners to help save them. In January 1933, a bomb was placed at the door of his family home in Seville, but it failed to go off. In May 1936, he was arrested for organising an attack against President Manuel Azaña the previous year. It had been overseen by the virulent extremist Mauricio Carlavilla, who had spread old conspiracy theories in the right that Jews and Freemasons were destroying Spain's past glories. Diaz Criado had been implicated in the assassination attempt on Azaña on the orders of the secretive Unión Militar Española, a group created after the coup attempt by General José Sanjurjo y Sacanell that was made up largely of disaffected high-ranking military personnel, a group of which he had been a member. He was also believed to have been involved in assassination attempts on two members of the Congress of Deputies: the law professor Luis Jiménez de Asúa and Francisco Largo Caballero. Carlavilla escaped to Portugal, but Diaz Criado was arrested in Alcalá de Henares. He was not charged.

== Spanish Civil War ==
After a relatively quiet few months, he reappeared at the onset of the civil war on 18 July 1936. Gonzalo Queipo de Llano, one of the leaders of the Nationalist uprising whose sociopathic radio broadcasts were edited into something more palatable in the right-leaning press, gave Diaz Criado the title Delegado Militar Gubernativo (government military delegate) for Andalucia and Extremadura, which effectively gave him carte-blanche to deal with anyone opposing the Nationalists. Diaz Criado, who was protected by bodyguards, operated from the comisaría Central de Investigación y Vigilancia in Calle Jaúregui, not far from his mentor Queipo, with the Seville police of the brigada social under his command since their chief, Emilio Sanz Bernuy, had just been assassinated like almost all other local officials in Seville. He led the information brigade of the Guardia Civil under the control of his assistant, Sergeant-Major José Rebollo Montiel. He received intelligence from the investigation bureau of the 2nd division, which contained the Ángel Macua Brigade, which specialised in door-to-door arrests. He also used the Brigadilla de Ejecuciones de Falange (Falange Execution Brigade), led by Pablo Fernández Gómez with a fleet of cars and the help of a henchman, Corporal José María Plaza. In addition to the Ranilla provincial prison, seven other sites were used: the Real Maestranza bullring, the Duque barracks, the Variedades cabaret, Casa del Pueblo on calle Cuna, the cinema on Calle Jáuregui (a holding centre for more than 2000 people), the basements of the Plaza de España and the Jesuits' residence on Calle Jesús del Gran Poder, whose courtyard No. 3 became notorious. There were also two prison ships docked on the Guadalquivir River: Cabo Carvoeiro (also called Boeiro) and Mogador. He ensured that the defiant population of the suburbs of Seville (La Macarena and Triana) had their male populations wiped out, and many were just shot or removed to the Cabo Carvoeiro prison ship. He took family members, including children and the elderly, as hostages and, if they remained alive, kept them in horrific conditions if the working-class leaders he was hunting could not be found, even for the duration of the war.

Different survivors said he told them that he was sorry that they had not been executed yet because he wanted to see their families' mourning. On 10 August, to commemorate Sanjurjada's failed coup, some murders were committed, including of Mayor José González Fernández de la Bandera and the writer and Andalucian nationalist Blas Infante.

Queipo de Llano would not hear a word against Diaz Criado. On 12 August, the press was warned not to intercede on behalf of any prisoners, or they would be considered as enemies undermining the Nationalists. Diaz Criado provided a daily report for Queipo de Llano; Commander José Cuesta Monereo, who was regarded as the real planner of the coup in Seville; and Colonel Francisco Bohórquez Vecina, a military judge with little interest in legislation. Often drunk in the daytime and turning up in the evening at his office, Diaz Criado would frequent nightclubs and surround himself with admirers; female dancers; and prostitutes including Doña Mariquita, who had sheltered him in 1931. She received payments for intercessions from those who wanted prisoners saved. He would sign about 60 death sentences a day with his characteristic "X2" signature and rarely communicated with or had any interest in the victims. The only visitors he received in his office were young women, who were typically preyed upon to save loved ones. The money and sexual favours offered by Mariquita were discussed informally between her, Diaz Criando; his friend Rebollo Montiel, who supervised most of the prisoners' torture; and whoever else was there in the small hours. Once, some women accompanying Diaz Criado were offered a coup de grâce and shot at prisoners since they had missed seeing the firing squad in action at his random invitation. That was followed by a regulares sergeant removing the gold teeth from the mouths of dead prisoners with a stone. His presence and behaviour were regarded with general unease, but his careless routine and drunkenness eventually cost him his position. Antonio Bahamonde Sánchez de Castro, Queipo de Llano's propagandist, claimed that General Emilio Mola, one of the three main leaders of the Nationalist uprising, learned that one of his friends was imprisoned in Seville and even rang Diaz Criado directly to make sure he was not killed, but the execution went ahead anyway. The final straw came in November 1936, when he accused the Portuguese vice-consul in Seville of being a spy, although he had actually been collecting information about arms deliveries from Nazi Germany and Fascist Italy at the request of Nicolás Franco, General Francisco Franco's brother. General Franco demanded his immediate removal. Portugal was supporting the Nationalists and an angry Queipo de Llano, who tolerated Diaz Criado, was now a personal embarrassment and was forced to apologise. Diaz Criado was posted to the Talavera de la Reina front and promoted to commander.

== Later life ==
He spent the final part of his career as an active soldier in Jaén, initially at the front and later in the transfer and the custody of prisoners. In March 1940, he was appointed military commander of Andújar. In 1943, he was promoted to lieutenant-colonel and was awarded the cross of the Royal and Military Order of Saint Hermenegild. He died in Seville on 7 July 1947, survived by his wife, Julia (née Benitez Lago), and son.

== Legacy ==
Later Francoist revisionist historians attempted to remove his contribution from memorials. Few photographs of him exist. In Seville, from July to November 1936, 8000 people were killed by Nationalists. Contemporaries who knew Diaz Criado estimated that he had overseen the deaths of 11,000 people. Antonio Bahamonde suggested the number was as many as 20,000.
