= David Carballo =

Spanish footballer

Personal information
- Full name: David Carballo Criado
- Date of birth: 2 March 2006 (age 20)
- Place of birth: As Pontes, Spain
- Height: 1.74 m (5 ft 9 in)
- Position: Midfielder

Team information
- Current team: Valladolid B (on loan from Racing Ferrol)

Youth career
- 2012–2014: As Pontes
- 2014–2022: Deportivo La Coruña
- 2022–2025: Racing Ferrol

Senior career*
Years	Team	Apps	(Gls)
2024–	Racing Ferrol	4	(0)
2025–	→ Valladolid B (loan)	0	(0)
- * Club domestic league appearances and goals as of 30 November 2025

David Carballo Criado (born 2 March 2006) is a Spanish professional footballer who plays as a midfielder for Real Valladolid Promesas, on loan from Racing de Ferrol.

== Career ==
Carballo was born in As Pontes de García Rodríguez, A Coruña, Galicia, and began his career with hometown side CD As Pontes at the age of six. He moved to Deportivo de La Coruña in 2014, before joining Racing de Ferrol's youth sides in 2022.

Carballo started to train with the main squad in March 2024, being also included in the pre-season. He made his first team debut on 1 November, starting in a 3–1 away win over CD Cuarte, for the season's Copa del Rey.

Carballo made his professional debut on 22 November 2024, coming on as a late substitute for Josué Dorrio in a 0–0 Segunda División home draw against Levante UD. On 2 February 2026, he moved out on loan to Real Valladolid Promesas until June.
