= Enrique Criado Navamuel =

Spanish diplomat, lawyer and writer

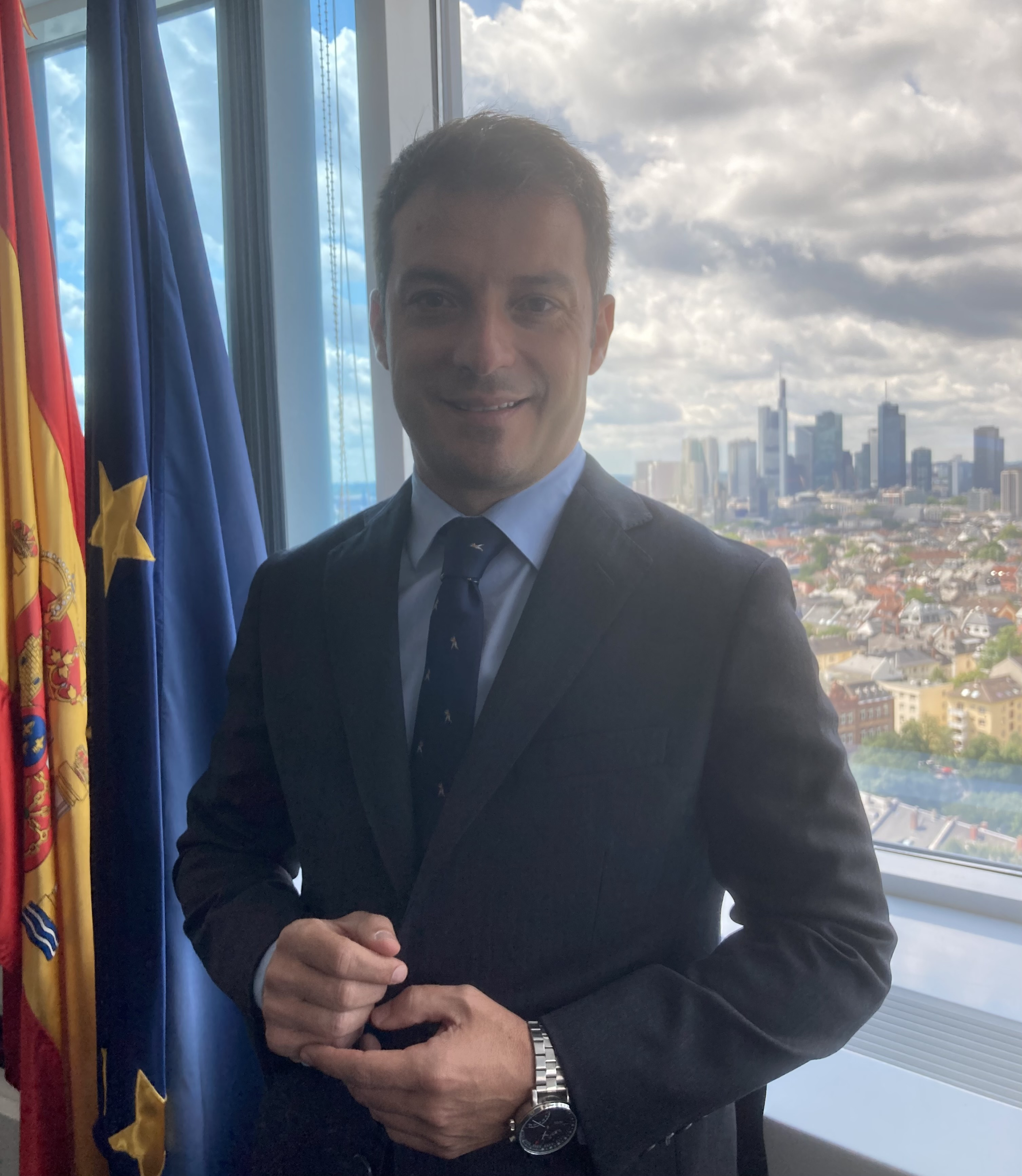
- Spanish diplomat and writer
- Born: 1981 (age 44–45); Madrid, Spain
- Education: Law degree at Universidad Complutense de Madrid and University of Vienna
- Occupation: Current Consul General of Spain in Frankfurt am Main

Enrique Criado Navamuel (born 1981 in Madrid, Spain), is a Spanish diplomat, lawyer and writer. He is the current Consul General of Spain in Frankfurt am Main. Author of two travel literature books and co-author of another two. “El balcón del Führer” is his first novel..

He is a member of the Spanish national team of writers “La Cervantina” since its establishment in 2022.

== Education ==
He studied Law at Universidad Complutense de Madrid, and the University of Vienna. He is a member of the Bar Association of Madrid. In 2007, he joined the Spanish Foreign Service as a career diplomat.

== Diplomatic career ==
After some brief periods working in the Spanish Embassies of La Habana (Cuba), and London (UK), he was posted as Deputy Head of Mission at the Embassy of Spain in Kinshasa (Republic of the Congo) for three years. Between 2012 and 2015, he worked as Counsellor at the Embassy of Spain in Canberra (Australia), during 2015 until 2018, as Deputy Head of Mission at the Embassy of Spain in Sofia (Bulgaria). Additionally, in the period between 2018 and 2021 he coordinated the Geopolitical Analysis Area of the Spanish Ministry of Defence.

=== Honours and rewards ===
In 2012 he was granted with the Officer's Cross of the Order of Civil Merit, given he's relevant services to the State, extraordinary work and other merits of a civil nature. In 2018, he was bestowed the Royal Order of Isabella the Catholic, and in 2021 the Military Cross for Aeronautic Merit, with the White Distinctive.

== Literary career ==
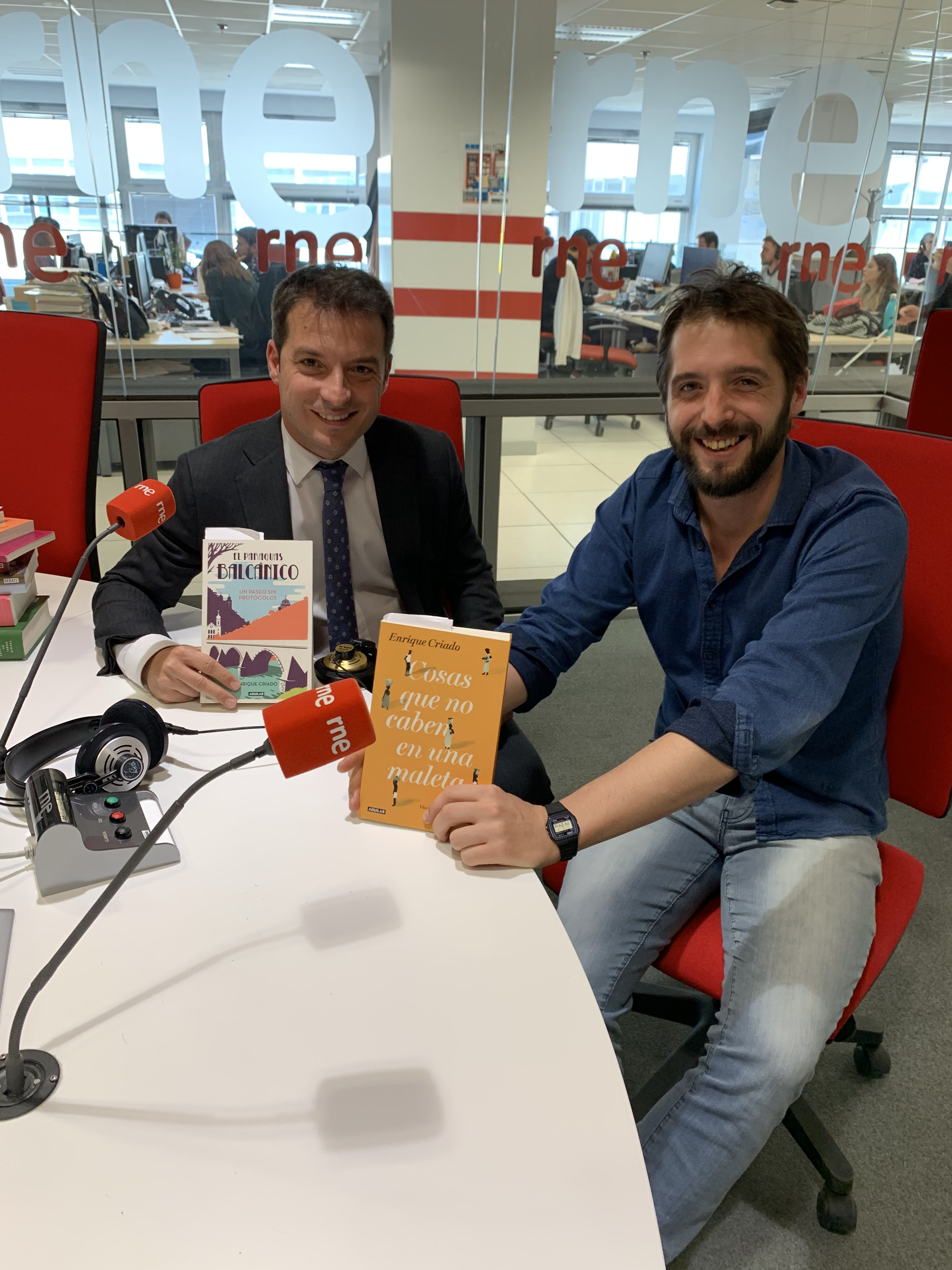
Enrique Criado presenting "Cosas que no caben en una maleta" and "El paraguas balcánico" on RNE.

His previous destinations and trips were source of inspiration for his first book of travel literature “Cosas que no caben en una maleta” (Aguilar, Penguin Random House, January 2016), which was reedited by Aguilar and translated to Bulgarian (Colibri, 2016) and at Latinamerica (Equidistancias, 2022). He wrote a second travel literature-genre book “El paraguas balcánico: un paseo sin protocolos” (Aguilar, Penguin Random House, 2019), which was reedited by Aguilar as well.

Later, in 2020 he co-authored and coordinated “Muchas vidas y un destino” (Sial Pigmalion), and “Ciudades lejanas” (Cuadernos del Laberinto, 2022), a narrative about Canberra in which he took part as co-author.

"El balcón del Führer" is his first novel, published by Editorial Funambulista in May 2024.

As an author, Enrique Criado is represented by literary agency Editabundo.
