= José Cuesta Monereo =

José Cuesta Monereo (5 December 1895 – 7 October 1981) was a senior Spanish army officer, regarded as the planner of the Spanish coup of July 1936 in Seville at the beginning of the Spanish Civil War, and thereafter other areas, initially under the command of general Gonzalo Queipo de Llano. The plans resulted in the abuse, torture and murder of thousands of local people.

== Biography ==
He was born in Jaén. He joined the army as a cadet at the Academia de Infantería de Toledo and became a 2nd lieutenant in 1913. He joined the Escuela Superior de Guerra de Madrid (Madrid War College) where he was captain of the general staff in 1920. He married Pilar Antolín Martínez in 1921. They had four children (the marriage lasted until 1934). He took part in the Moroccan campaign of 1924-25 and was described as cultured and an excellent chief of staff. In 1931, he was aide-de-camp to general Miguel Cabanellas Ferrer, chief of the Moroccan military forces and later of the Guardia Civil, whom he accompanied on his visits to garrisons of the protectorate and the Guardia Civil and command centres of Andalucia and Extremadura in Spain. In 1934, he was assigned to Seville, from where he communicated with Cabanellas - then head of the 5th Zaragoza division - and Queipo de Llano, to lead the Nationalist rebel uprising in Andalucía.

In February 1936 he was stationed in Seville, in the 2nd Organic Division, as commander of the general staff. From that time, and particularly from April and May, he directed the military conspiracy to take control of the Seville region. despite Manuel Queipo de Llano's public claim that it was his doing and general Francisco Franco's subsequent praise of Queipo de Llano. Later, Queipo de Llano stated, "although it is true that Cuesta could not have done anything without me, I could not have done anything without Cuesta." On the morning of July 18, along with Queipo de Llano, Cuesta Monereo was one of the officers who detained the commander of the 2nd Division, general José Fernández de Villa-Abrille and other officers, after which Cuesta's plan progressed. He was also one of those in charge of supervising actions and communicating the Nationalists' public messages. He personally wrote the Nationalists' declaration of the state of war. On 7 September, he issued a list of instructions to the press prohibiting the reporting of details of the brutal and callous repression carried out by Nationalist rebels against their political opponents or the working public, and instructing them to soften the violent and sexually-explicit content in the terror-laden broadcasts of Queipo de Llano to more conservative reading. Queipo de Llano was an alcoholic, with serious liver problems and Cuesta related frequently taking a glass of whisky from his hand as he was about to go on air. Notwithstanding, the story was spread that Queipo de Llano - like Cuesta - was teetotal.

Later, in December 1936, already qualified as a lieutenant colonel, Queipo promoted him to chief of staff of the Army of the South, a position that he held for the rest of the Civil War. By then, the brutal terror campaign led until November by the sadistic Manuel Díaz Criado - who provided daily reports to Cuesta, Queipo de Llano and colonel Francisco Bohórquez Vecina - had resulted in 8000 executions in Seville alone. In addition to his systematic military planning to take over Republican-held towns in southern Spain, he was the link between Queipo and Franco, frequently travelling to the Terminus, the mobile headquarters of the military high command.

In 1943, he took the senior command course at the Escuela Superior del Ejército. With the post of brigadier general, he became chief of instruction and then, in 1947, 2nd chief of the army general staff. The same year he married Concha Antolín Martínez. In 1949, he was assigned as chief of staff to the captaincy general of Seville. In 1951, on his promotion to major general, he was appointed general delegate of the Spanish high commission in Morocco, and two years later military governor of the Campo de Gibraltar. During this tenure, a visit by Queen Elizabeth II to Gibraltar led to the closure of the border at La Línea de la Concepción. In 1957, he was made captain general of the Balearic Islands and finally, in 1959, lieutenant general, chief of the central general staff, with the rank of lieutenant general on reserve status from 1961.

He died on 7 October 1981 in Madrid, survived for a short time by his second wife. He was buried in Seville.

== Military Awards ==
- Cross of War Merit (1939)
- Grand Cross of the Order of Cisneros (1956)
- Grand Cross of the Aeronautic Merit with Distinction (1961)
- Grand Cross of the Military Merit with Distinction (1961)
- Grand Cross of the Naval Merit with Distinction (1961)
- Grand Cross of the Imperial Order of the Yoke and Arrows (1964)
