= Raised left hand =

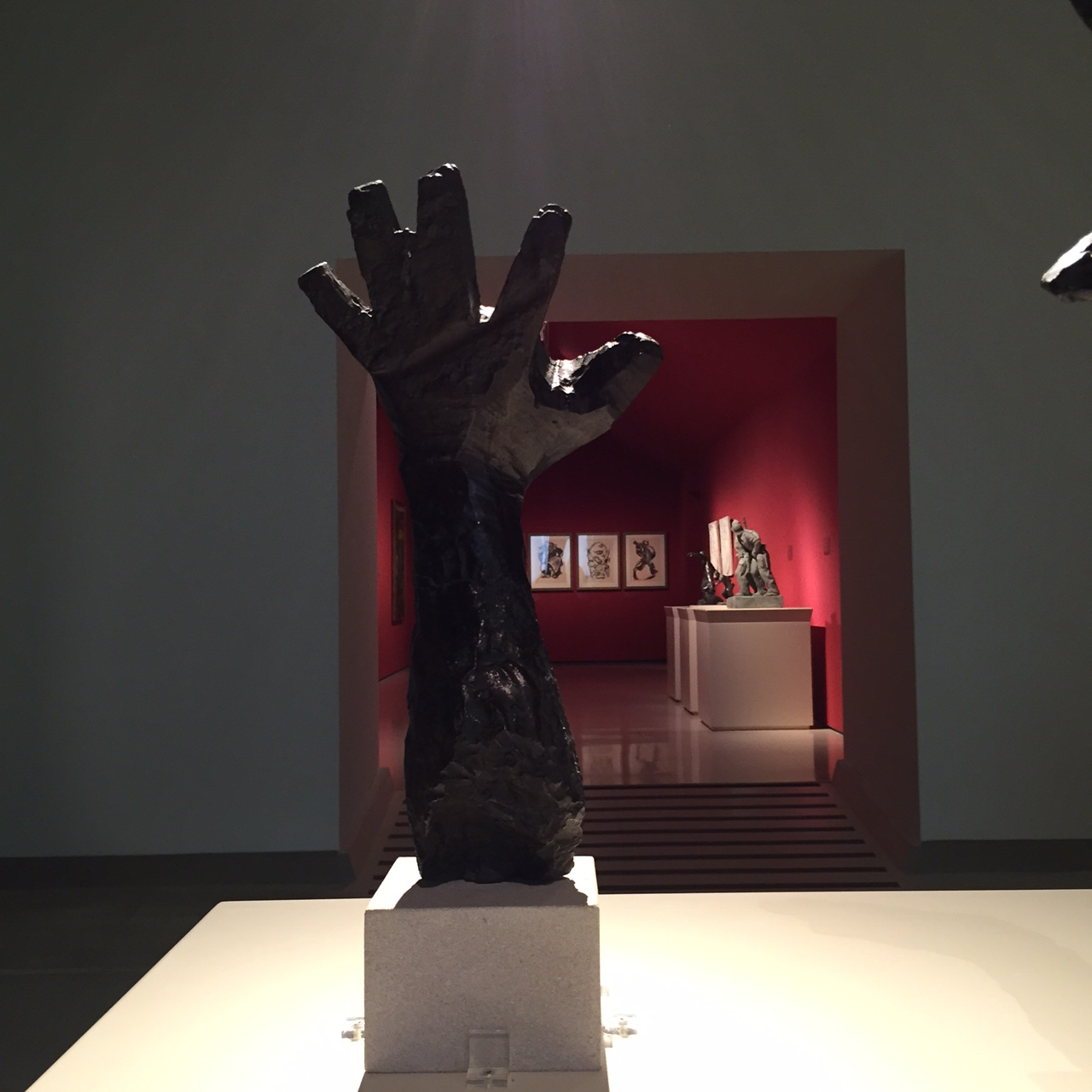
- Julio González, c. 1942, Raised Left Hand, bronze cast, Museu Nacional d'Art de Catalunya, donated by Roberta González, daughter of the artist, 1972; admission, 1973
- Artist: Julio González
- Year: 1942
- Completion date: 1942
- Type: sculpture
- Medium: bronze
- Subject: hand
- Location: Museu Nacional d'Art de Catalunya; Barcelona

Raised Left Hand is a bronze sculpture by Julio González displayed in the Museu Nacional d'Art de Catalunya, created in 1942, the year of his death. This work of art was created as a plaster cast, and then later cast in bronze. It is unclear if the when or if the artist cast the final sculpture. Other sculptures created within the last months of the artist's life were cast in bronze posthumous. For example, the other monumental sculpture created in this period, Head of the Montserrat, II, was cast in bronze after the artist's death.

== Context ==
The artwork, like many other plaster casts González created between 1940 and 1942, embodies the artist's own feelings towards the injustice of war. By 1942, the artist witnessed the destruction of his native country through the Spanish Civil War, and then again in the beginning of the Second World War. The artist was directly affected by the latter war; his daughter and son-in-law went into hiding shortly after World War II began leaving the artist alone as his health failed; this is because his son-in-law was a known anti-Nazi, and thus was being sought by the German secret police. At this time, the artist began to focus on figurative drawings and plaster castings. The art produced during the last two years of his life are testimonies to the suffering and despair González felt towards tyranny and war. His last casts suggest the extent of despair and terror he felt and witness; these include the La Montserrat Shouting, Abstract Figure, and the Raised Left Hand.

== Description ==
Raised Left Hand is currently displayed in the modern art section of the Museu Nacional d'Art de Catalunya. This bronze sculpture is installed next to a separate sculpture, Raised Right Hand. Both sculptures, as well as both plaster and bronze versions, are the same size: 37.2 × 19 × 15.2 cm. When viewed together, the two arms create the illusion that they are from the same body reaching out into space. The way the fingers are spaced out creates a sense of urgency. Emotions like anger, despair, terror, and confusion are evoked by the position of the hands. This is echoed by the direction the two sculptures are intentionally installed, and by the inconsistent surface level the artist uses to create the arms, hands, and fingers. These elements together interpreted within the historical context expresses a clear reaction. As scholar Vicente Aguilera Cerni suggests, the last sculptures cast by Julio González are reminders of "man’s right to exist without the threat of terror and destruction, in security and dignity."

== Provenance ==
It is unclear where the sculpture was between 1942 and 1972. Very little is written about Raised Left Hand's appearance in museum collections or gallery exhibitions. The only provenance detailed by the Museu Nacional d'Art de Catalunya is when the bronze sculpture was added to the permanent collection in 1973 by the donation of his daughter, Roberta. Roberta González did not donate the plaster sculpture of the Raised Left Hand to the museum however; according to catalogues published by the Institut Valencià d'Art Modern, she donated the plaster copy to Galérie de France, Paris. There is a Raised Left Hand No. 2 in the IVAM collection currently. It is unclear how many bronze casts, and by whom, were created after the artist's death.
