= 1936 in the Spanish Civil War =

The Spanish Civil War (1936–1939) broke out with a military uprising in Morocco on July 17, 1936, triggered by events in Madrid. Within days, Spain was divided in two: a "Republican" or "Loyalist" Spain consisting of the Second Spanish Republic (within which were pockets of revolutionary anarchism and Trotskyism), and a "Nationalist" Spain under the insurgent generals, and, eventually, under the leadership of General Francisco Franco.

By the summer, important tendencies of the war become clear, both in terms of atrocities on both sides and in the contrast between the Soviet Union's intermittent help to the Republican government and the committed support of Fascist Italy and Nazi Germany for the Nationalists.

In the early days of the war, over 50,000 people who were caught on the "wrong" side of the lines were assassinated or summarily executed. In these paseos ("strolls" or "walks"), as the executions were called, the victims were taken from their refuges or jails by armed people to be shot outside of town. Probably the most famous such victim was the poet and dramatist Federico García Lorca. The outbreak of the war provided an excuse for settling accounts and resolving long-standing feuds. Thus, this practice became widespread during the war in areas conquered. In most areas, even within a single given village, both sides committed assassinations.

Any hope of a quick ending to the war was dashed on July 21, the fifth day of the rebellion, when the Nationalists captured the main Spanish naval base at Ferrol in northwestern Spain. This encouraged the fascist and other sympathetic regimes of Europe to help Franco, who had already contacted the governments of Germany and Italy the day before. On July 26, the future Axis powers cast their lot with the Nationalists. German assistance, channeled through Franco rather than to the Nationalists in general, consolidated his leadership position of the insurgency.

In the north, a rebel force under Colonel Beorlegui, sent by General Emilio Mola, advanced on Gipuzkoa. On September 5, after heavy fighting, it took Irún, closing the French border to the Republicans. On September 13 the Basques surrendered San Sebastián to the Nationalists, who then advanced toward their capital, Bilbao, but were stopped at the border of the province. The capture of Gipuzkoa had isolated the Republican provinces in the north.

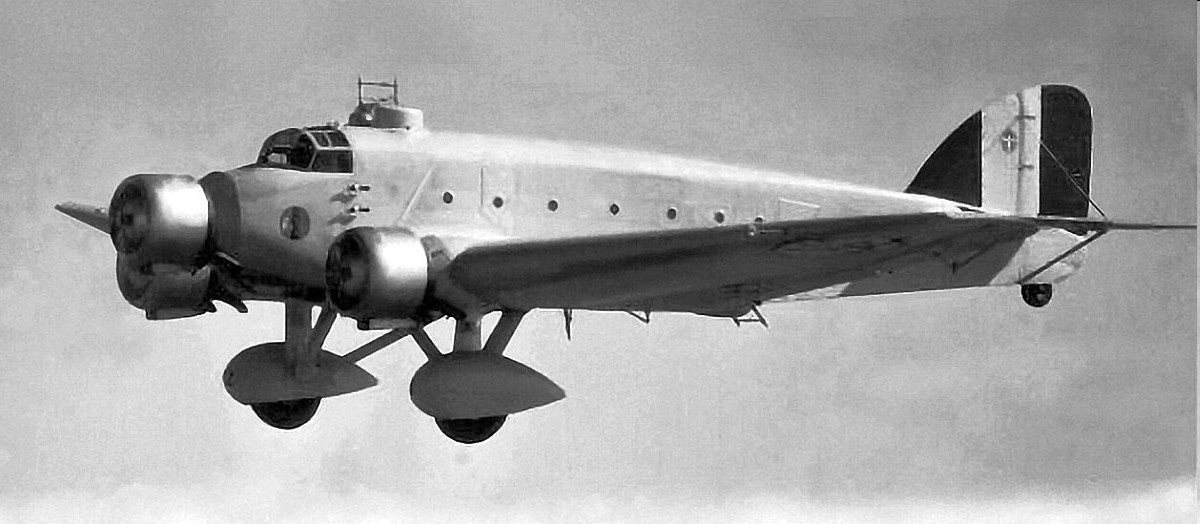
Nationalist aircraft bomb Madrid in late November 1936.

Nationalist forces under Franco won a great symbolic victory on September 27 when they relieved the besieged Alcázar at Toledo. Two days after relieving the siege, Franco proclaimed himself Generalísimo and Caudillo ("chieftain"); he would forcibly unify the various Falangist and Royalist elements of the Nationalist cause.

In October, the Nationalists launched a major offensive toward Madrid, reaching it in early November and launching a major assault on the city on November 8. The Republican government was forced to shift from Madrid to Valencia, out of the combat zone, on November 6. However, the Nationalists' attack on the capital was repulsed in fierce fighting between November 8 and 23. A contributory factor in the successful Republican defence was the arrival of the International Brigades, though only around 3,000 of them participated in the battle. Having failed to take the capital, Franco bombarded it from the air and, in the following two years, mounted several offensives to try to encircle Madrid.

On November 18, Germany and Italy officially recognized the Franco regime, and on December 23, Italy sent "volunteers" of its own to fight for the Nationalists.

== Detailed chronology: 1936 ==
February 16
Popular Front electoral victory.

=== July ===
July 12
In Madrid, Lieutenant José Castillo of the Guardia de Asalto is murdered by four falangist gunmen who awaited the recently married lieutenant in the afternoon hours in front of his house. He was a member of the Unión Militar Republicana Antifascista, an anti-fascist organization for military members, and also helped to train socialist militia.
July 13
In retaliation, around 3am, José Calvo Sotelo, leader of the right-wing alfonsist Spanish Renovation party, is murdered by police officers. Only a few hours after the assassination of Castillo, his close friend Police Captain Fernando Condés and other police officers arrest Calvo Sotelo in his house. Paul Preston has speculated that the police officers may have acted of their own accord. This was a factor in the uprising of 18 July, though the Nationalist revolt had been in planning for months. Driving with him in a police car of the Guardia de Asalto, Officer Luis Cuenca shot him in the back of the neck in summary execution.
July 14
Shootout between the Guardia de Asalto and falangist militias in the streets surrounding the cemetery of Madrid, where the burials of José Castillo and Calvo Sotelo are taking place. Four people killed.
July 17
Army uprising in Morocco. Military uprising of the Spanish Legion in Morocco. General Manuel Romerales Quintero, commanding officer of the East Army, is arrested by rebels, who also imprisoned commanding General Gomez in the late afternoon. Loyal police troops from the Guardia Civil and Guardia de Asalto hold the cities Tetouan and Larache, but come under heavy attack by the rebels.
By late evening, all of Morocco is in the hands of the rebels. Rebels declare a "state of war" in the name of Franco as their commander (while the latter is in Las Palmas de Gran Canaria unaware of the events). Prime Minister Santiago Casares Quiroga spends the whole night telephoning different regional military administrations to clarify the situation.
July 18
Pamplona, Zaragoza, Oviedo, Salamanca, Ávila, Segovia, and Cádiz are already in rebel hands. The rebels gain control over about one third of Spain.
July 19
Franco flies from the Canary Islands to Tétouan and takes command of the army in Africa.
Casares Quiroga resigns as chief of the Republican government.
Diego Martínez Barrio tries to form a new government, but cannot obtain broad enough parliamentary support.
José Giral forms a government, which orders that arms be issued to the general populace.
Seville, one of the most important cities in the south, is unsuccessfully defended by local police troops and a poorly armed workers' militia. While the heaviest weapons police possess are machine guns, the rebel General Gonzalo Queipo de Llano sends in artillery and heavily armed troops. Seville falls to the rebels.
This is the day the People's Olympiad was scheduled to open in Barcelona, as a protest against the official 1936 Summer Olympics in Berlin, the capital of Nazi Germany. The games have now been cancelled due to the war.
In Barcelona, heavy street-fighting breaks out between police, workers militias and loyal troops on one side and around 12,000 rebel soldiers on the other. After it becomes obvious that Civil Guard, Guardia de Asalto and City Police would not be enough to keep control of the city, the Generalitat (regional government of Catalonia), decide belatedly to arm loyal civilians.
July 20
Rebels defeated in Madrid and Barcelona, but they take Mallorca. In Madrid, around 10,000 citizens, among them police officers and soldiers, attack the Montaña Barracks, held by rebel General Fanjul and around 2500 soldiers. Some soldiers in the Barracks want to surrender and wave a white flag. The crowd moves towards the barracks, while the soldiers who wanted to surrender are overwhelmed by the rebels. The rebels then immediately fire heavy machine guns and throw hand grenades into the masses, leaving many wounded or dead. The crowd storms the barracks and massacres the defenders. General Fanjul is among the few captured alive.
Barcelona: The combined forces of local police troops, workers' militias and citizens gain back control over the city in a dramatic two-day barricade fight.
Mallorca: After heavy resistance, especially at the air base, the rebels gain control over Mallorca.
The official leader of the uprising, General José Sanjurjo, dies in an air accident in a small aircraft bringing him back to Spain from his exile in Portugal. He had insisted, against the advice of the pilot, on taking all of his possessions with him. The overloaded aircraft crashed taking off.
July 21
Start of the Siege of the Alcázar de Toledo.
The Nationalist insurgents have control of the Spanish zones of Morocco, the Canary Islands, the Balearic Islands except Menorca, the part of Spain north of the Sierra de Guadarrama and the Ebro (except Asturias, Cantabria, the north of the Basque Country, and Catalonia). Among the major cities, the insurgents hold Seville, but the Republicans retain Madrid and Barcelona.
Toledo: After three days of street battles against forces loyal to the government, about 1000 Civil and Assault Guards, falangists and a handful of infantry cadets, under the leadership of Colonel José Moscardó Ituarte, retreat into the Alcázar of Toledo, a stone fortress set on high ground overlooking the Tagus and the city. They take with them their own families, plus a few hundred women and children as hostages, most of them families of well-known leftists.
July 22
Vallehermoso, Santa Cruz de Tenerife in la Gomera, a village of 4000, is the last place in the Canary Islands to fall to the rebels. Police Officer Francisco Mas García organized the hopeless resistance. The actual battle for the town lasted several hours. The councilor, the police officers and the leader of the local workers' council were condemned to death. In the hour before his execution, police chief Don Antonio wrote to his wife: "I die calm, because I believe in the justice of God".
The navy and air force remain loyal to the government. Thanks to the initiative of noncommissioned officer Benjamin Balboa, most of the Navy stayed loyal to the Republic. He was on duty in the central military radio station. As soon as he got notice of the uprising he informed the Naval Ministry and arrested his commanding officer, Captain Castor Ibáñez, then spent the night informing navy ships about the uprising. The sailors on the ships formed councils and gained control of the ships, despite heavy resistance from the officers. Spain lost three quarters of its navy officers that night, but the Navy was saved for the Republic. The officers of the Spanish Air Force are traditionally very Republican, but the air force has only a few obsolete planes.
July 23
The Nationalists declare a government in the form of the National Defense Council, which meets for the first time in Burgos.
July 24
Start of French aid to the Republican side. For the moment, the help only involves sending a handful of obsolete aircraft for the Spanish Republican Air Force, but the very fact that France seems willing to help is eminently morally important for the supporters of the Republic.
The Durruti Column, around three thousand men, mostly workers, led by Buenaventura Durruti are the first volunteer militia to leave Barcelona, heading for the Aragon front.
July 28
First arrival of German and Italian planes in aid of the Nationalist side. In the world's first major military airlift, German and Italian planes transport troops from Morocco to Spain, bypassing the naval blockade.
July 31
Great Britain bans sale of arms to the Spanish Republic.

=== August ===
The social revolution, collectivizations. (See Spanish Revolution of 1936)

August 1
Under British pressure, France reverses its policy of helping Republican Spain, and together the two nations found the Non-Intervention Committee.
At the pleading of the Marqués de Viana and the exiled ex-king of Spain, Alfonso XIII, Benito Mussolini sends aircraft in support of the rebels. Mussolini wants money for this help; the Spanish billionaire Juan March Ordinas pays for the Italian aircraft. Because Franco has no air personnel or pilots, Mussolini sends the aircraft with Italian pilots. After two of the aircraft crash on their way in the French protectorate in Morocco, the world becomes aware of this clear breach of nonintervention.
August 2
Troops of the rebellious Spanish Legion, led by Colonel Carlos Asensio Cabanillas and Major Antonio Castejón Espinosa, start their advance from Seville towards Madrid.
August 6
Josep Sunyol, a Republican Left of Catalonia deputy and president of FC Barcelona, is caught in an ambush in the Guadarrama and is killed by pro-Franco troops.
General Franco arrives in Seville.
August 8
France closes its border with Spain.
While Mallorca is still in hands of the nationalists, Ibiza and Formentera are back in Republican hands.
August 10
The Nationalists take Mérida on their way to Madrid cutting off the Republicans in Badajoz. The well-known female Republican activist Leiva is executed by the Nationalists. Major Heli Rolando de Tella y Cantos defeats a Republican counterattack on the city.
August 14
Nationalist forces under Colonel Juan Yagüe attack and conquer Badajoz, uniting the two parts of the Nationalist territory. The Republican commander, Colonel Ildefonso Puigdendolas, flees to Portugal. Around 4000 people die during and after the attack in Badajoz. In the local bullring, thousands of people are shot down by the Nationalists with machine guns. See Massacre of Badajoz.
August 16
Battle of Mallorca begins: The Spanish Republican Army lands on the coast of Mallorca under heavy bombardment by Italian planes. Captain Alberto Bayo establishes a small base on the coast.
August 19
Viznar, Granada: Federico García Lorca, among others, is murdered by members of the falangist Escuadra Negra. Before being killed, they are forced to dig their own graves. Later, the official excuse for the brutal assassination of García Lorca will be that he was homosexual.
August 24
Italy and Germany join officially the Non-Intervention agreement. This gives them the possibility to participate in the international blockade of Spain: Italian and German warships are now allowed to stay in Spanish territorial waters and prevent other ships from reaching the Spanish shore.

=== September ===
September 3
The Republican forces under Captain Alberto Bayo retreat from Mallorca. After establishing a small base on the shore of Mallorca two weeks earlier, the Republican troops could not make it to the inner area of the island. Under permanent attack by enemy land and air forces, the retreat was more of a flight, leaving behind many men, weapons and valuable material.
September 4
Prime Minister Francisco Largo Caballero presents new government: six Socialists, four Republicans, two Communists, one Catalan Republican, and one Basque Nationalist.
September 5
After heavy fighting, the Basque city of Irún is taken by the Nationalists. Anarchist militias, defending the city, destroy most of the government buildings with dynamite to prevent their use by the Nationalists. The Nationalists control now a large and contiguous portion of Spain. The Basque Country is separated from the rest of the Republic, the Basque coastline is already blocked by warships of the "Non Intervention" states, and eventually even its supply lines over the French border are cut off.
September 8
In Portugal, sailors on two naval vessels mutiny, apparently intending to take the ships to join the republicans in Spain. The revolt is crushed by forces loyal to the Portuguese dictator António de Oliveira Salazar and anti-communist repression intensifies.
September 9
23 countries attend first official meeting of the Non-Intervention committee in London. The psychological effect on the Republican side is grave. Only Mexico "supported fully and publicly the claim of the Madrid government.[...] Mexico's attitude gave immense moral comfort to the Republic, especially since the major South American governments - those of Argentina, Brazil, Chile and Peru - sympathized more or less openly with the Insurgents." But Mexican aid means relatively little in practical terms if the French border is closed and if the dictators remain free to supply the Nationalists with a quality and quantity of weapons far beyond the power of Mexico.
Nationalists have been under siege in the Alcázar de Toledo since July 21. Today, Lt. Colonel Vicente Rojo Lluch enters the Alcázar under a flag of truce to try to obtain its surrender, and failing that, the release of the hostages. Colonel Moscardo refuses both proposals.
September 13
The Basques surrender San Sebastián to the Nationalists rather than risk its destruction. Anarchist militias wanting to set the town ablaze are shot. The Nationalists now advance in the direction of the Basque main city, Bilbao.
The government agree to send part of the national gold reserves to the Soviet Union. The gold is sent as security for future buying of war material from the Soviet Union.
September 14
Pius XI condemns the Republican Government for their "satanic hate against God", reacting to the news that Father Josep Samsó PP of Santa María de Mataró near Barcelona, who had been imprisoned for being a priest, was taken from jail and executed in the local cemetery on the 1 September.
September 19
The Nationalists take the island of Ibiza while the rebellion succeeds in the island of Fernando Poo (Spanish Guinea).
September 24
Against the recommendation of his German advisors, Franco postpones the advance on Madrid in order to aid the insurgents in the Alcázar of Toledo. The siege has taken on immense symbolic importance for both sides.
The Nationalist Junta annuls all agrarian reform that took place after the February 1936 elections.
September 26
The new Catalan government (Generalitat de Catalunya) includes now the groups who gained power resisting the military rebellion. The Trotskyist POUM and the Anarchist CNT/FAI send ministers.
September 27
Toledo falls to the Nationalists. Some hundred militia man try to stop the Nationalist advance into the city and were all killed by Legionnaires and Moroccan mercenaries, the "Moros". Around 40 anarchists, running out of ammunition, set fire to the building they were defending and are burned alive rather than be taken as prisoners. The Nationalists murder the doctor and the nurses in the hospital of Toledo; unarmed, wounded militiamen are killed in their beds. It transpires that the hostages taken by Nationalist Colonel Moscardo were killed in the beginning of the siege, which explains why Moscardo refused to hand them over on September 9.
September 27
The Non-Intervention committee refuses to hear charges against Portugal for its open support of the insurgents and the clear defiance of the blockade.
September 29
The Nationalist junta in Burgos declare Franco Generalísimo. A Nationalist naval squadron breaks the Republic's hold over the Strait of Gibraltar at the Battle of Cape Espartel; a Republican destroyer is sunk and another one is damaged.
Comintern approves the creation of the International Brigades.

=== October ===
October 1
Franco declares himself head of state and Generalísimo.
The Republican government concedes autonomy to the Basque Country (in practice, Biscay and Gipuzkoa) as Euzkadi, with José Antonio Aguirre as its president.
October 3
In order to legitimise the rebellion inside and outside Spain, Franco establishes a civil government for the "National Zone". This Civil Junta has practically no say in any matter, because at the beginning of their uprising the insurgent generals declared a State of War covering all of Spain.
October 6
The Soviet Union declares it will be no more bound by Non-Intervention than are Portugal, Italy, and Germany. The Spanish Republic will now, three months into the uprising, be able to buy armaments and ammunition. Unlike the "National Zone", which is supplied openly over the Portuguese border, the Republic still suffers under the closed French border and the "Non-Intervention" blockade at sea.
October 7
The first International Brigades are founded in Albacete. The Italian Communist chief Palmiro Togliatti and the French Communist André Marty are the effective organizational heads.
October 9
Foundation of the "Popular Army" in the Spanish Republic. The plan is to organize the loyal portion of the former army, along with the militias, under a modern and efficient officers corps with a central command.
October 12
During a celebration in the University of Salamanca (National Zone), with guests including Franco's wife present, Miguel de Unamuno, the world-famous philosopher and chairman of the university, speaks out against General Millán Astray, first commander of the Spanish Legion. Until now a supporter of the Nationalist rebellion, he says that listening to the official speech of Millán Astray he has come to realize the inhuman and ignoble nature of the uprising. Unamuno is later removed as rector of the university and confined to his house. He died in December 1936 of gas poisoning, possibly in suspicious circumstances.
October 14
Nationalist troops from the Canary Islands disembark at Bata and take control of the continental part of Spanish Guinea.
October 24
First shipment of the Spanish Gold Reserves to the Soviet Union. Spain will ultimately send more than half its gold reserve to the USSR; at $35 per troy ounce the shipment was worth US$578,000,000.
October 27
The first Russian tanks arrive in Madrid. The heavily armored T-26 tanks, which weigh more than 10 tons apiece, drive from the central train station directly into battle. The defenders of Madrid, who until now had to use Molotov cocktails (glass bottles filled with gasoline and burning cloth) against the German and Italian tanks on the Nationalist side, gain the ability to slow the Nationalist advance.
October 27
16 people dead and 60 wounded in Nationalist air raid against Madrid. Six bombs detonate in the Plaza de Colón, in the middle of the city. One bomb falls into a queue of women waiting for milk for their children. This is the first bombing in modern history without any military purpose, other than to spread terror among the civilian population. The air raid was made by German pilots in Junkers Ju 52s. Madrid has no air defenses to prevent enemy aircraft from flying over the city.

=== November–December ===
November 1
The Nationalist army arrive in Madrid. An army of roughly 25,000 men arrive the suburbs of Madrid. Italian planes drop leaflets demanding the citizens to help them to take the city, "otherwise the National aviation will wipe Madrid off the earth".
November 2
The first Russian aircraft over Madrid surprise the Nationalist bombers. The Republican aviation had till now only a handful of obsolete machines, but today the people of Madrid can see the first Russian "Chatos" defending the city. Citizens stand in the streets and watch the sky, ignoring the alarms and the calls for shelter. Several attacking aircraft are shot down; some Russian aircraft are also shot down by Italian Fiats guarding the bombers. One Russian pilot suffers a horrible death: After his machine is destroyed by an Italian Fiat he saves himself with a jump out of his burning plane, his parachute brings him safely to the city, but he is lynched by a mob of furious citizens, who think he is a German Nazi from the Condor Legion.
November 4
Four Anarchist ministers join the Republican government: Federica Montseny - portfolio of education, Juan Garcia Oliver - law, Juan López Sánchez, and Joan Peiró. By this means, Largo Caballero brings figures from what is by far Spain's largest mass movement into the government.
The Nationalists take the Madrid suburb Getafe. After a heavy attack by Moorish cavalry, tanks, and aircraft, the defenders are completely defeated. The wounded are walking disorientated over the battlefield, the organization of the defense in this area breaks down. Falangist General Varela tells foreign journalists in a press conference: "You can tell the world, Madrid will fall within one week." General Mola plans the attack route: over the Casa de Campo and the practically unpopulated University City (Ciudad Universitaria), to avoid heavy losses in the fierce street fight he would anticipate if he had to enter through the south suburbs, traditionally strong districts of the working class. Nationalist casualties are mounting but still tolerable: 115 men today.
November 5
For the first time, the Republican air force forces attacking bombers and their escort to break up the attack on Madrid before they even reach the city.
November 6
After heavy fighting which causes his forces 426 casualties, Yague occupies the suburb Carabanchel and the strategically important hill Cerro de los Angeles. With that, the Nationalists are standing on the door to Madrid, whose defense is organized under the newly created Junta de Defensa de Madrid directed by General Jose Miaja.
The Republican government moves to Valencia.
November 7
The attack on Madrid. Nationalists gain important bridges on the way to the inner city. General Varela's troops enter Casa de Campo and the University City in fierce man-to-man and house-to-house combat. Both sides suffer heavily. Yague loses today 313 men, mostly Legionnaires and Moors; he is seriously worried by the mounting casualties to his Africa veterans. Franco declares that he will be listening the very next day the holy measures in the cathedral of Madrid.
November 8–9
All-out assault on Madrid. The International Brigades arrive. The defenders are running out of ammunition; on several points the front is close to breaking; in the University City the enemy pushes through the Republican lines. This is the moment when the first "Internationals" arrive in Madrid. The shocked citizens think in the first moment that the Nationalists are in the inner city when they see 3,000 uniformed and disciplined soldiers marching in. The members, mostly German, Polish, and Italian veterans of World War I and of German concentration camps, start to sing revolutionary songs and the "Internationale". The citizens rush out of their houses and sing and shout for joy. The "Brigadistas" march immediately to the front, and throw themselves unflinchingly into battle. 2,000 of them die or are wounded within 48 hours. In the War Ministry of Madrid, telegrams are arriving congratulating General Franco on his victorious entry, but only Republican officers are there to read them. When the Moroccan mercenaries of Franco break through the Republican lines in direction of the Model Prison, General Miaja himself drives to the threatened sector, takes his pistol in one hand and shouts at the retreating soldiers: "Cowards! Die in your trenches. Die with your General." This encourages his men, the gap is closed. All over the city, citizens, women as well as the men, are reinforcing the trenches, taking the rifles from dead or wounded soldiers. The Nationalist Ejército de África loses a further 282 veterans in these two days.
Around 1000 mostly political prisoners are massacred by their Republican Militia guards today in Paracuellos del Jarama. The prisoners, most of them accused Nationalists, were to be evacuated to Valencia from Madrid to prevent their liberation by Nationalist troops. Their Guards decide to join the defense of Madrid, kill all of the prisoners and return to Madrid.
November 10
Front line established in Madrid, the University City back under Republican control. Nationalist casualties are 155. The famous Anarchist Buenaventura Durruti arrives today with the 3,000-man "Durruti Column". They left the Saragossa Front to help defend Madrid.
November 18
Italy and Germany recognize the Franco government. Everybody expects the fall of Madrid within hours. Franco throws everything he has into the battle, German aircraft are fighting over Madrid, and both countries expect this diplomatic step to strengthen the position of Franco and weaken the stand and the morale of the Republic. The Durruti Column has been fighting in the University City without rest since the 15th, only 400 of the 3,000 survive, and those are completely exhausted. Durruti will launch an attack at the university hospital the next day. Between the 11th and the 18th, the Nationalist attackers have suffered 1,290 casualties; they have forced a wedge inside the Ciudad Universitaria but failed to control it or to advance into the capital.
November 19
Anarchist leader Buenaventura Durruti is gravely wounded during the fighting in Madrid. The Durruti Column launches their attack on the university hospital, held by the Nationalists. Around 2 p.m., Durruti is hit by a bullet on the right side of his breast, which passes through his chest and lungs. It is suspected that he may have shot from behind by one of his men, either by accident or possibly in an intentional effort to stop the suicidal attack. What actually happened remains controversial. Nationalist casualties today are 262 with no terrain won at all; the offensive has stalled and turned into what Mola and Yague most feared, a close-quarters fight in urban environment.
November 20
Buenaventura Durruti dies at 4 a.m. The Nationalists suffer a further 294 casualties while repulsing furious counter-attacks against Carabanchel and Vertice Basurero. José Antonio Primo de Rivera, son of dictator Miguel Primo de Rivera and founder of the Falange, is tried by a civil court and executed in Alicante, where he has been a prisoner since before the insurgency. The execution is carried out by the new Communist civil governor of Alicante, without awaiting the confirmation of sentence by the government. This breaking of the law and insubordination angered Largo Caballero, but the Republic is already dependent on Soviet supplies and the Spanish Communist Party. This Party starts to act as a state within the state.
November 23
Battle of Madrid ends; with both sides exhausted, a front stabilizes. After 2 weeks, Franco has to give up his plans of taking the city. He now begins preparing himself and his allies for a long and expensive war.
December 11
Julio Álvarez del Vayo complains today before the League of the Nations in Geneva about the support of Portugal, Italy and Germany for the Rebels and the political and economic isolation of the Spanish Republic by the Democratic Nations and the Non-Intervention Committee.
December 17
New government constituted in Aragon. The new Consejo de Aragon has a clear majority of Anarchists. The front-line in Aragon is basically formed by Anarchist and Socialist militia. Some areas and villages in Aragon start immediately with the "revolution", what means the reorganization of public life under Anarchist ideals, foundation of communes and self-organization of factories and farms. Some of the villages replace money with coupons handed out by the local authorities. In Aragon, the world can see the most radical reformation of public life and a true people's revolution.
December 22
Thousands of Nationalist Italian volunteers land in Cádiz, the Nationalist port.
December 24
Thousands have to spend the Christmas days in the trenches on the front. Many refugees have nowhere to go and have to stay at subway stations and refugee camps.
December 30
George Orwell enlists himself in a Republican POUM militia to fight against fascism.
December 31
Miguel de Unamuno dies in his house in Salamanca. As soon as they got notice of the death of their father, his two sons enlist themselves in the Antifascist Militias.

== See also ==
- 1937 in the Spanish Civil War
- 1938–1939 in the Spanish Civil War
- List of Spanish Nationalist military equipment of the Spanish Civil War
- Condor Legion
- Aviazione Legionaria
- List of Spanish Republican military equipment of the Spanish Civil War
