= Julio de Urquijo e Ibarra =

Basque linguist, cultural activist and Spanish Carlist politician

Julio de Urquijo Count of Urquijo
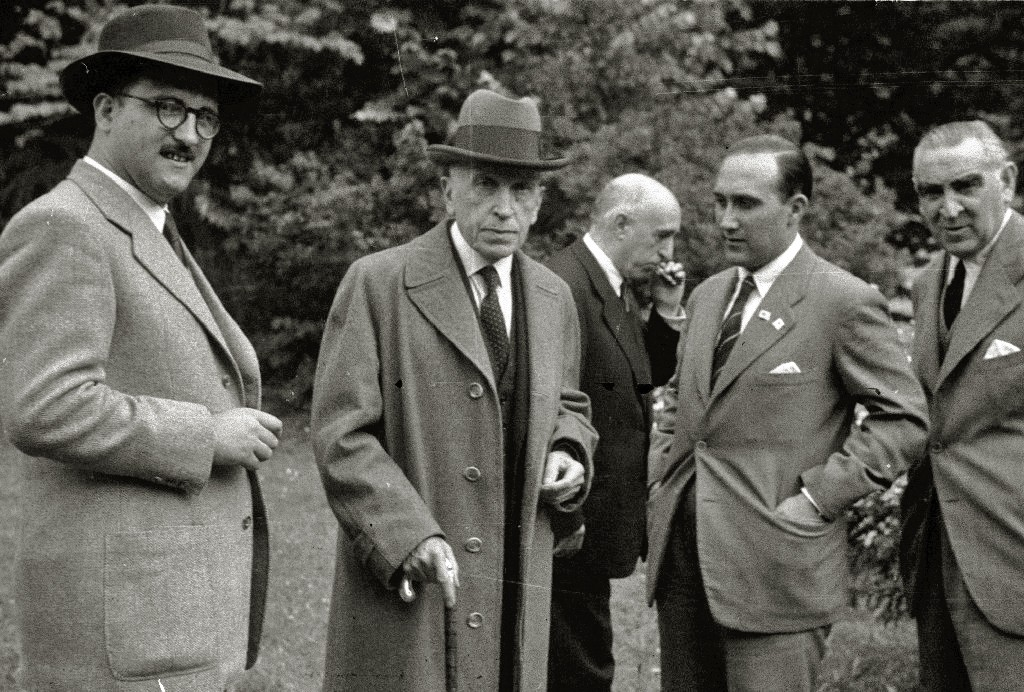
- Born: Julio Gabriel de Urquijo e Ibarra; 1871; Deusto, Spain
- Died: 1950 (aged 78–79); San Sebastián, Spain
- Occupation: scientist
- Known for: linguist
- Political party: Comunión Tradicionalista

Julio de Urquijo e Ibarra, Count of Urquijo (1871–1950), in Basque self-styled as Julio Urkixokoa, was a Basque linguist, cultural activist, and a Spanish Carlist politician. As a Traditionalist deputy he twice served in the Cortes, during the terms of 1903–1905 and 1931–1933, though the climax of his political activity fell on the late Restoration period. As a scientist he was the moving spirit behind setting up numerous vascologist institutions, especially Revista Internacional de Estudios Vascos (1907) and Sociedad de Estudios Vascos (1918). Himself he specialized in Basque paremiology and bibliography. He opposed academy-driven unification of Basque dialects and preferred to wait until standard Basque emerges naturally.

== Family and youth ==
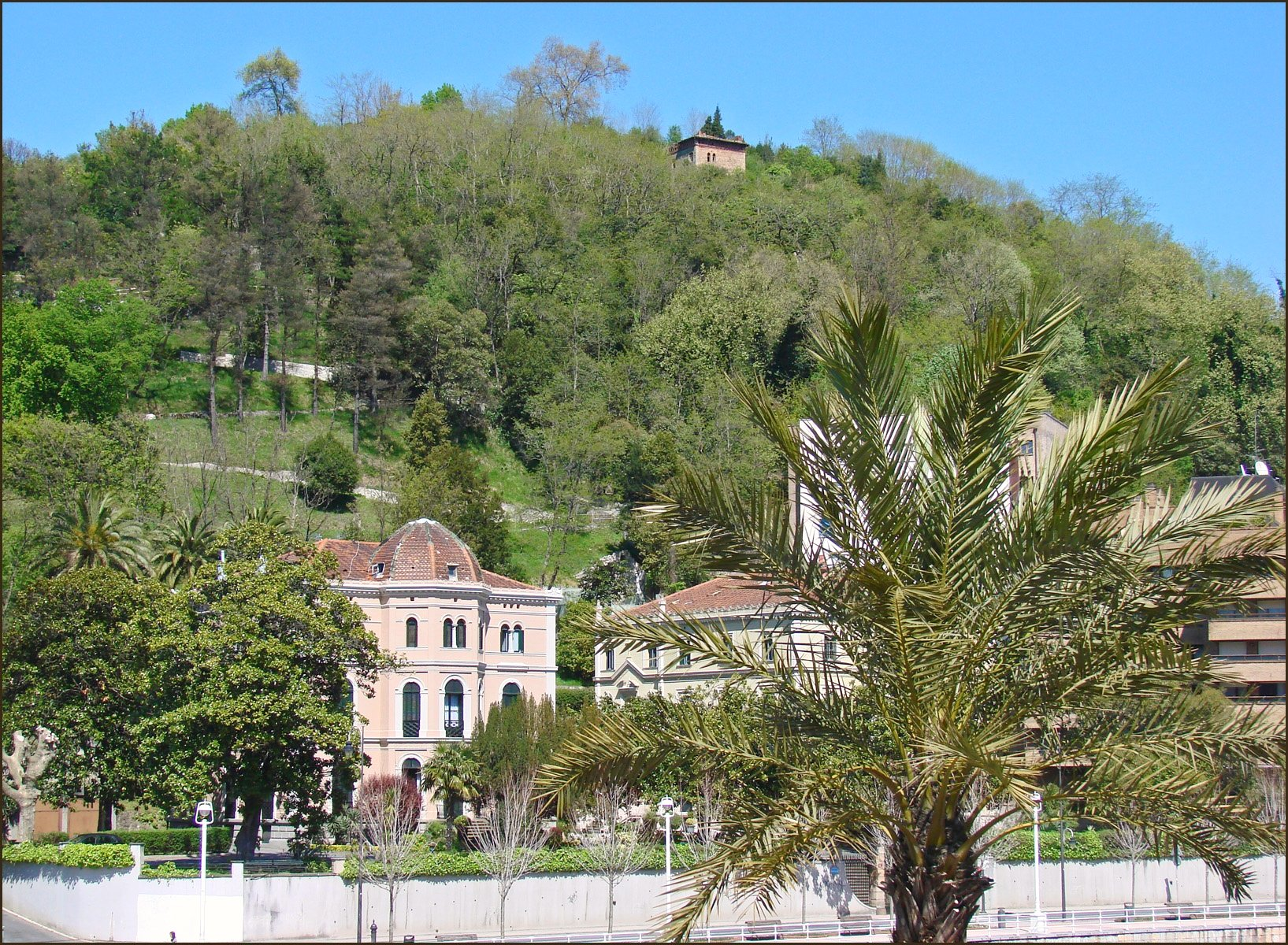
La Cava residence, Deusto

Julio Gabriel Ospín de Urquijo e Ibarra, Goicoechea, y Arambarri was born into a wealthy and distinguished family originating from Valle de Ayala. Julio's grandfather, Serapio Ospín Urquijo y Zabalegui, for many years served as secretary of the Bilbao council; Julio's father, Nicasio Adolfo Ospín Urquijo Goicoechea (1839–1895), was dean of the local Colegio de abogados, ayuntamiento official and briefly deputy to the Cortes. In 1865 he married María del Rosario de Ibarra y Arambarri (1846–1875), heir to the family which already formed part of the Basque industrial oligarchy; it controlled 40% of the Biscay iron ore mining. Her father and Julio's maternal grandfather was among provincial political magnates; he served as president of Diputación de Vizcaya and held a number of other official positions, apart from leading many commercial and corporative bodies.

In 1869, Adolfo and Rosario moved to Deusto, at that time a suburb of Bilbao; they settled at the La Cava residence, just completed by Rosario's father. The couple had 5 children, 2 daughters and 3 sons. During the Third Carlist War the family left Deusto and settled in Santander, where Julio in his early childhood was orphaned by his mother. From that moment onwards it was her sister Rafaela Ibarra who took care of early education of her nephews. Following a brief spell in La Ribera, the family returned to La Cava, repaired after the war damages suffered, in 1878. In 1891 Adolfo Urquijo and his family moved to Bilbao. La Cava remained the property of Rafaela and her family.

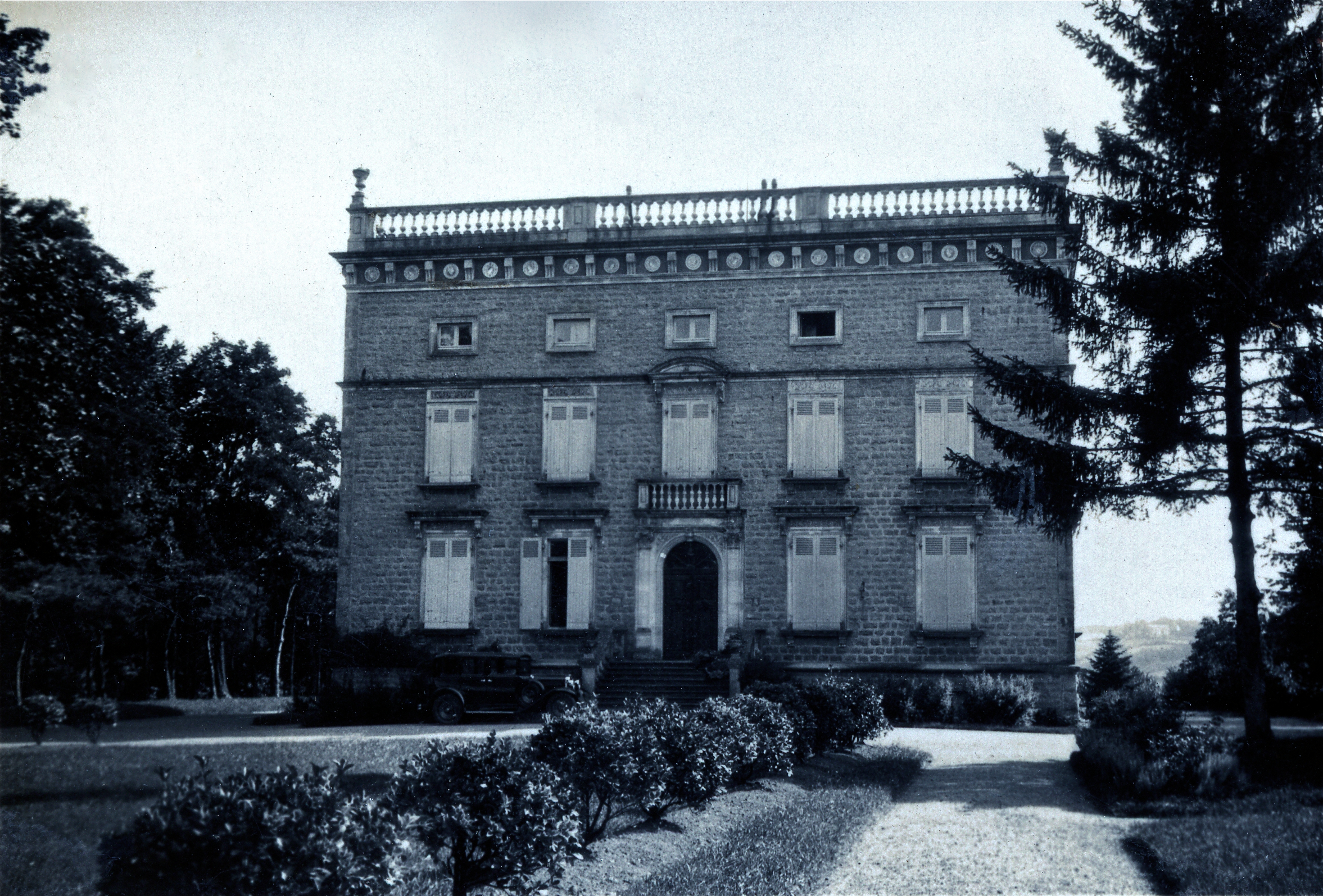
Urquijo Baita, residence of Julio de Urquijo in Saint-Jean-de-Luz

Julio received secondary education at Instituto de Bilbao. Following the bachillerato obtained in 1887, the same year he enrolled at faculty of law at the Jesuit Deusto college, just set up with immense financial and organizational help of the Ibarra family. Urquijo crowned his university career graduating in derecho canonigo y civil at the University of Salamanca in 1892. Inheriting enough wealth, he did not commence professional law career. In 1894 Urquijo married Vicenta de Olazábal y Álvarez de Eulate; her father, Tirso de Olazábal, was leader of Gipuzkoan Carlism and one of national party jefes. The couple settled at the estate carved out from the Olazábal holding in Saint-Jean-de-Luz, in the French province of Labourd just 8 km from the Spanish frontier. Julio and Vicenta had no issue.

Many Urquijo's relatives made their names in politics. His older brother Adolfo was an Alfonsist politician, deputy, president of the Biscay Diputación, publisher and vascólogo; Julio's younger brother José became a conservative politician, deputy, publisher of Gaceta del Norte and businessman. Julio's nephews served as mayors of Bilbao in the early and late 1930s; another one became a rally driver. Julio's aunt Rafaela founded Congregación de los Santos Angeles Custodios; in 1984 she was beatified by the Roman Catholic Church and her canonization process is ongoing. Six members of Julio's family, including his brother José, were executed by Republicans during the early months of the Civil War.

== Carlist: earlier years ==
Carlist standard

Though some sources refer to Urquijo as exposed to Carlist heritage from his early childhood, other works suggest that his ancestors, especially on the paternal side, were Liberal dinasticos. Julio's father by the end of his life assumed more conservative position and his older brother joined the Conservatives, forging friendly relationship with Alfonso XIII. The young Julio is not known for his political preferences until the mid-1890s, when following the 1894 marriage he moved to Saint-Jean-de-Luz. Living next to his father-in-law's estate, widely considered headquarters of Carlist conspiracy abroad, he became exposed to the movements' activities and got engaged himself.

Already in 1896 the press reported him as supposed to run for the Cortes on the Carlist ticket from Tolosa district, the news which proved false. He was, however, active setting up local Gipuzkoan party structures, like centre of Juventud Carlista opened in Irun in 1902. During the 1903 election campaign he did actually represent Carlism in Tolosa and gained the parliamentary seat. During the next two years he supported usually doomed Carlist legal initiatives in Cortes and kept mobilising local support when as deputy attending provincial feasts. During the 1905 campaign Urquijo did not join - as he was initially rumored – Liga Foral Autonomista, but declared himself in disagreement with its manifesto; as a Carlist he unsuccessfully competed in Tolosa against the fuerista candidate. Still in Tolosa Urquijo was initially reported as running in the 1907 campaign, but eventually he joined electoral efforts of Esteban Bilbao in Vitoria, briefly detained as a result of his altercation with jefe of the local Guardia Civil.

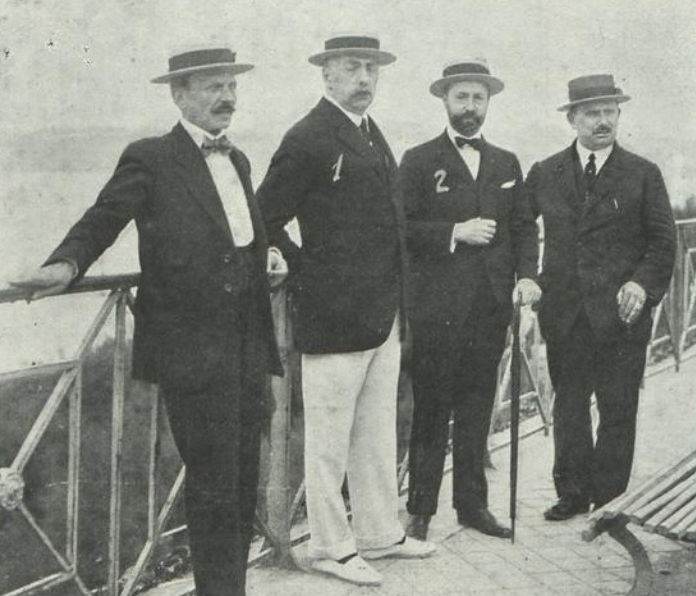
with Don Jaime, Biarritz 1919

During the early 20th century Urquijo together with Esteban Bilbao and Victor Pradera formed a young breed of Carlist activists, not necessarily adverse but definitely distinct from an older generation, formed during the Third Carlist War. Both the claimant and his Jefe Delegado, marqués de Cerralbo, promoted the young party militants in their effort to build new, modern party structures. Also the Carlist prince Don Jaime remained on friendly terms with Urquijo, almost his peer, as the latter accompanied the former in his incognito visits to Spain. In 1907-1909 Urquijo served as the last political secretary of Carlos VII, though it is not clear whether he lived with his king in Venice during that period. In 1909 he attended the funeral of Don Carlos and paid respect to the new Carlist king, Jaime III. Following the unrest which rocked Catalonia later that year Urquijo, assisting his father-in-law, got engaged in trafficking arms, intended for a potential Carlist insurgency. When in 1910 Tirso de Olazábal was ordered by the French authorities to settle North of the Loire, it was Julio de Urquijo who briefly replaced him, supervising the contraband until the situation returned to normal.

== Carlist: later years ==
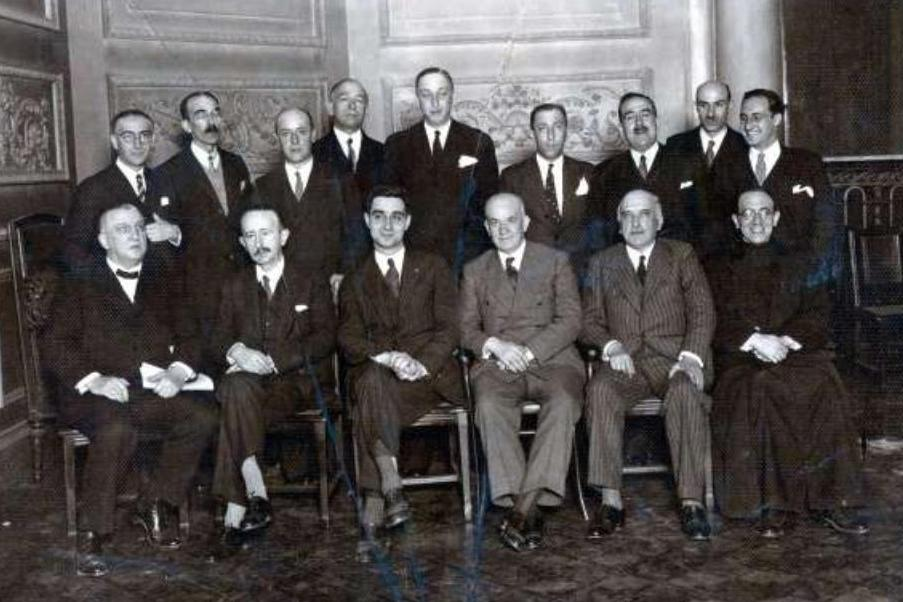
Urquijo in Basque-Carlist minority

In the 1910s Urquijo's engagement in Carlism decreased as he was consumed by Basque cultural initiatives, though in 1919 he found time to confront the rebellious Mellistas. Having moved from France and settled in San Sebastián, he is not known as active in Carlist structures in final years of the Restoration period or during the Primo de Rivera dictatorship. It was not in relation to party politics that his political preferences were mentioned, but rather when discussing his engagement in Sociedad de Estudios Vascos – e.g. in 1917 described as "caracterizado jaimista", because of his historical research – e.g. in 1925 quoted discussing Gipuzkoan Traditionalist past, or in wake of his honorable appointments – e.g. in 1929 presenting him as sort of atypical Carlist when admitted to Real Academia Española.

During the 1931 elections the Carlists were negotiating alliance with PNV; already an iconic figure of the Basque cultural movement, Urquijo emerged as an excellent candidate, though it seems that he was more difficult to accept for the Carlists rather than for the nationalists. Officially a católico-fuerista candidate he emerged victorious from Gipuzkoa and joined the Basque-Carlist minority. As political tension mounted he is reported as "not uninterested in the idea of a general Catholic rising", though insurrectional concept has not even passed to the planning phase; Urquijo was also noted for intransigent defense of Catholic Church. It is not clear whether legal action against Urquijo, considered by the Cortes, had anything to do with conspiracy or whether it was rather related to his engagement in the conflict between Republican authorities and the primate Segura.

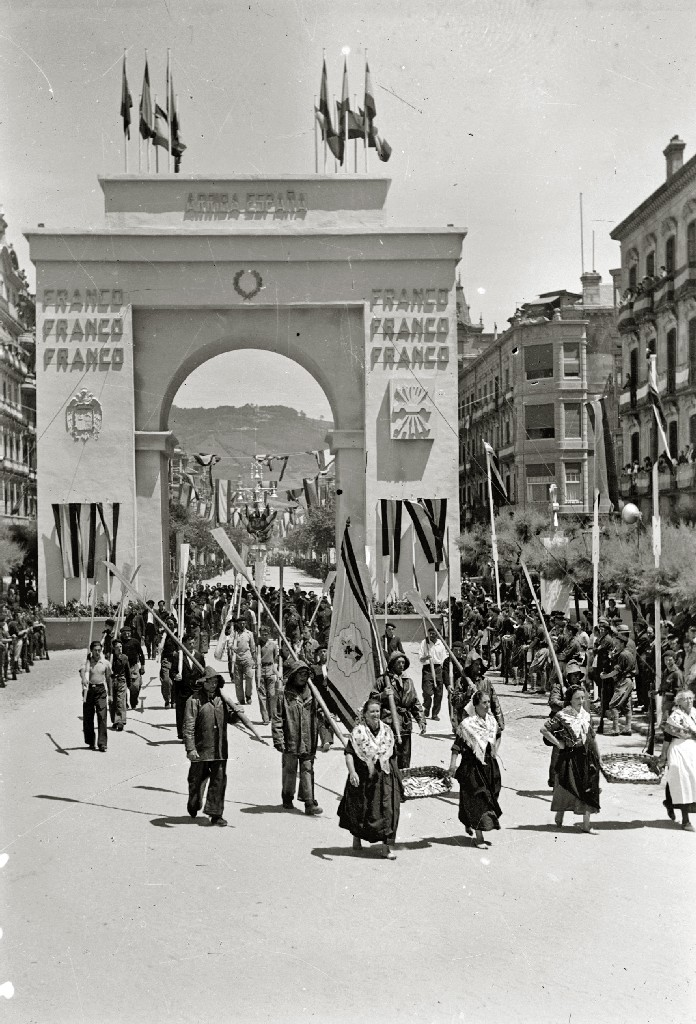
San Sebastián, 1939

The question of autonomy status for the Vasco-Navarrese area fuelled the row between nationalists and Carlists and divided the Carlists themselves. Urquijo is listed neither among its key opponents nor among its key proponents; even detailed studies dedicated to Carlist-Basque negotiations on the autonomy do not mention Urquijo as engaged, either during the initial phase when SEV drafted its autonomy plan or during the last-minute attempt to rescue the project by Elorza and Arregui. Urquijo represented the Carlists on the key assembly, gathering deputies and local Vasco-Navarrese mayors, and left before the end of "disagreeable session"; soon afterwards the Catholic-fuerista minority disintegrated altogether.

In the 1933 electoral campaign renewing the Carlists-Basque alliance was already unthinkable and Urquijo was not needed as a candidate. None of the sources consulted provides any information on Urquijo's political activities during final years of the Republic or whether he was anyhow involved in preparations to the 1936 coup. At the outbreak of the Spanish Civil War he was in San Sebastián, where the rebels failed; though not detained, fearing for his life Urquijo fled. He re-emerged in Gipuzkoa when the province was already captured by the Nationalists, but refrained from political activity. Though obituaries claimed that he "militió siempre en las filas del Tradicionalismo español" no study confirms (or denies) that he remained a Carlist also in the 1940s.

== Linguist: the beginner ==
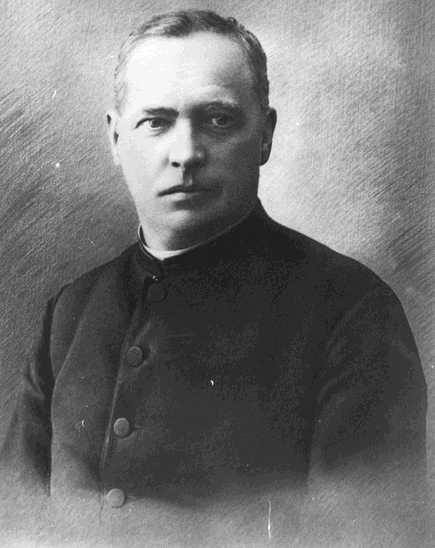
Young Azkue

Among Urquijo's Deusto teachers Román Biel and Tomás Escriche Mieg were those who raised his interest in linguistics; it was further reinforced by comparative works of Julio Cejador and by Resurreción María Azkue, who served as the family chaplain and in 1888 assumed the chair of Basque language in Instituto de Bilbao. Initially Urquijo's juvenile interest - apart from learning foreign languages - tended to focus not on any particular language but on comparative linguistics with issues like linguistic parentage, inter-linguistic influences or general "Sachwortgeschichte". It soon evolved into studies on artificial languages; in 1889 he published his first work, a booklet in volapük, and started correspondence with volapük activists, entering also the St. Petersburg volapük Academy. Living in aristocratic and cosmopolitan Saint-Jean-de-Luz Urquijo got his xenophile attitude reinforced, though he became disappointed with chaotic and contrived character of volapük, which he finally abandoned in 1905.

Urquijo's disillusionment with artificial languages might have pushed him towards studying Basque, another language with apparently great potential for literary emergence but firmly based in locally spoken dialects. Around 1905 he started correspondence with foreign vascologists like Julien Vinson and Hugo Schuchardt, twice meeting the latter in his Graz study. Initially their relation was far from partnership, Urquijo providing materials and information requested and accepting scholarly dictatorship of the Austrian. Urquijo's own interest in Basque was very much formatted along Schuchardt's lines, with focus on historical analysis, cross-linguistic influences, hybrids, "Sprachmischung" and comparatistics at the expense of neo-grammar. Gradually he was becoming more and more competent intellectual partner of both Schuchardt and Azkue, the number of his other correspondents also growing rapidly.

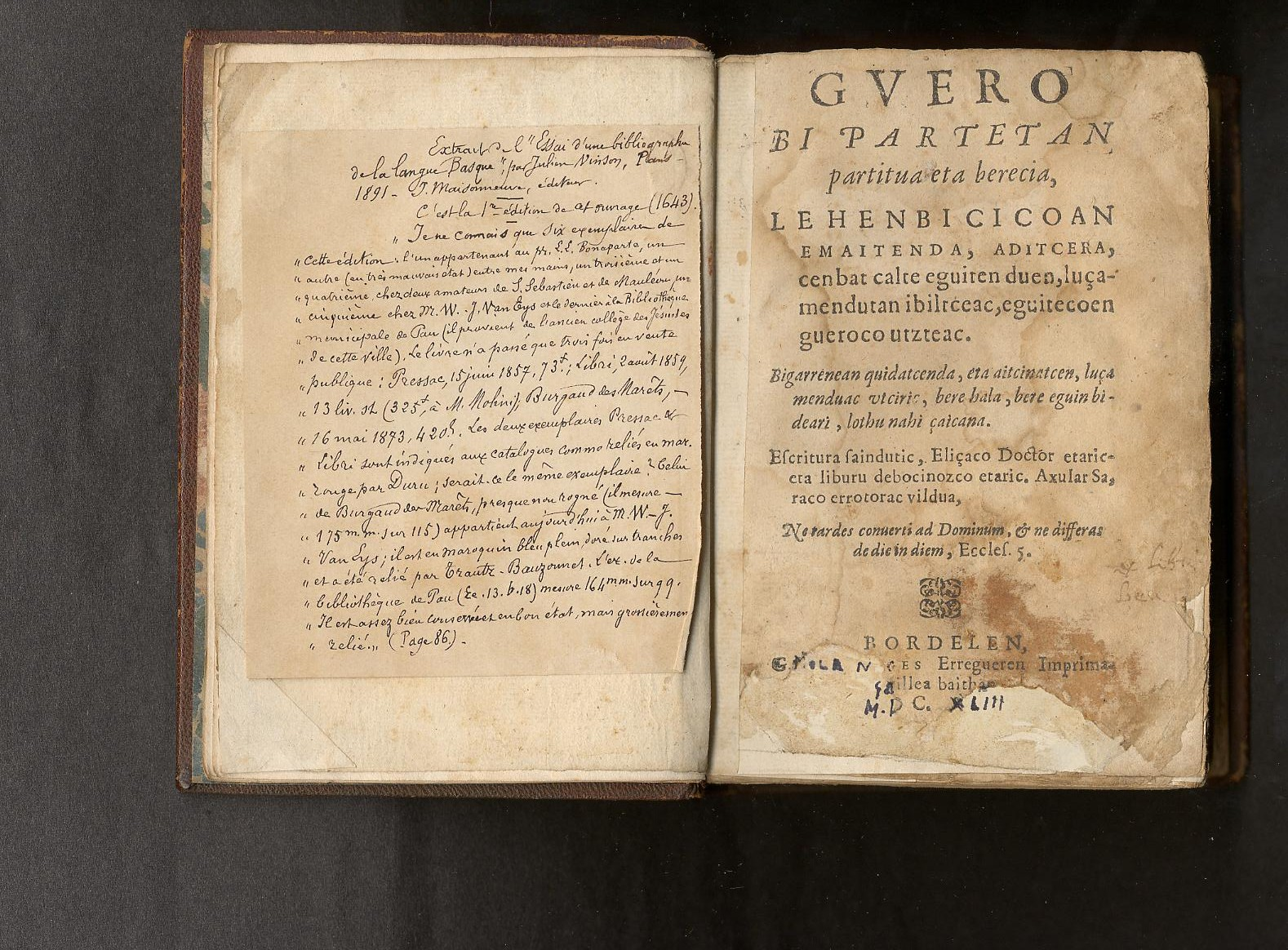
Gero, 1643

Urquijo was fully aware of his deficiencies in terms of linguistic professional training, which resulted in extreme criticism towards own work, combined with focus on verifiability, sound referential basis, documentation, systematic approach, caution towards speculative hypotheses and, last but not least, personal modesty. His prudent and circumspect stance pushed him also towards areas he felt less handicapped by his lack of linguistic education. He started to collect historical Basque prints; during electoral campaigns he allegedly instructed his agents to look for books rather than for votes, launching a widely scaled search and patrolling caserios, churches and convents. Developing relationship with established booksellers across Europe he started to build a library which soon assumed a monumental size. In the mid-1930s his collection grew to some 11,000 items, including a number of rarities, in 1936 saved from the war mayhem by the autonomous Basque government. Gradually his bibliophilia, possibly bordering bibliomania, converted to bibliography, which became one of his favorite disciplines.

== Vascólogo: organizer ==
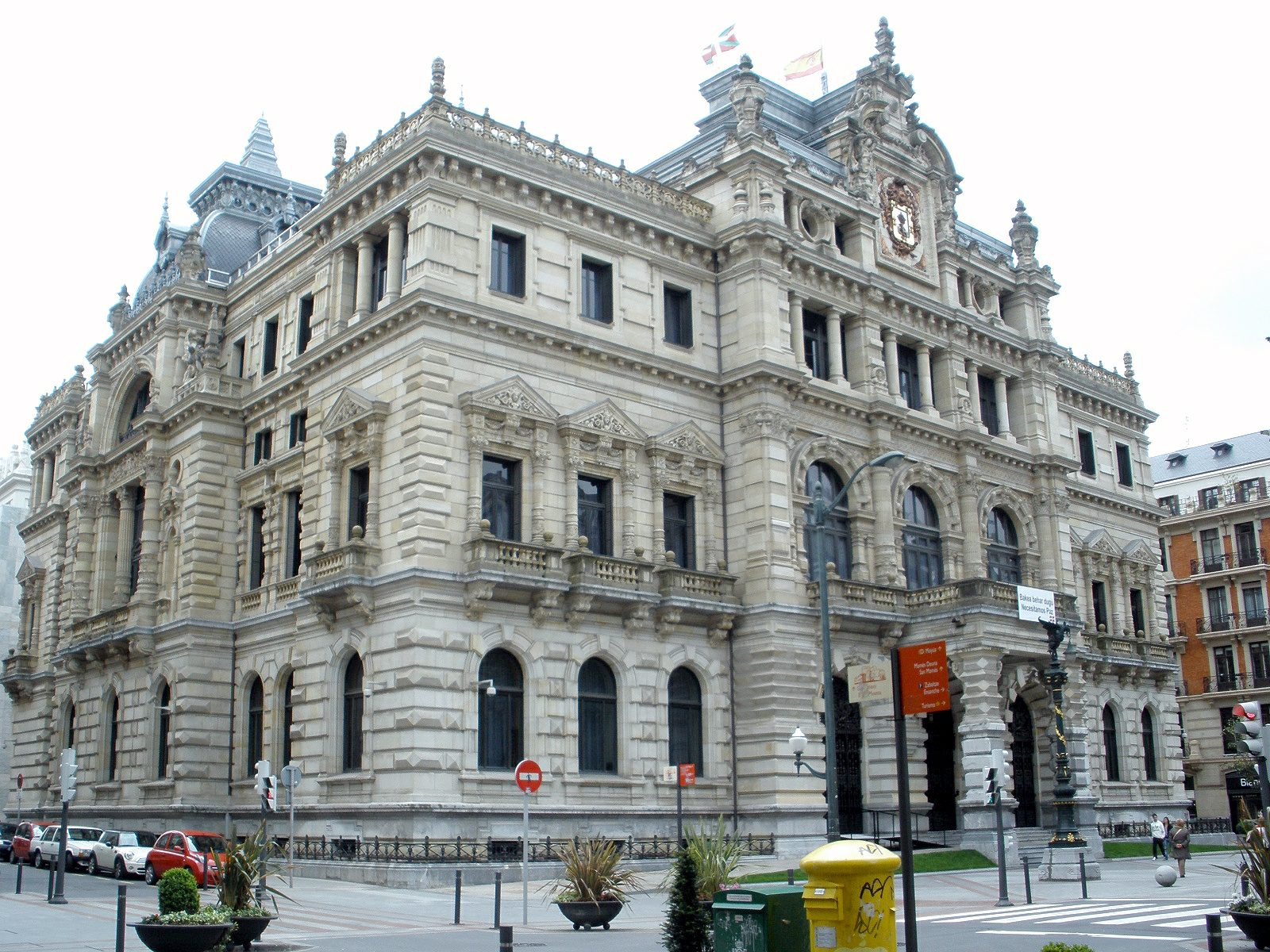
Biscay Diputacion site, Bilbao

Urquijo was convinced that to be sustainable, vascólogia must assume a formal shape and strove to build a network of research institutions. In 1901 he co-founded Eskualzaleen Biltzarra, association aiming at promotion of Basque culture. At that time he was already harboring an idea of "Academia de la Lengua Vascongada" and influenced his older brother accordingly; the result was a 1906 initiative fathered by Adolfo Urquijo as head of the Biscay Diputacion, though it eventually came to nothing.

In 1907 Urquijo used his own funds to found Revista Internacional de los Estudios Vascos. Formally he delegated editorial duties standing as owner and manager, though Urquijo remained its moving spirit, attracting a number of Spanish and foreign correspondents. Based in Paris, it was issued also in San Sebastián, as Urquijo realized that it had to be rooted in the Vascongadas. Its focus was initially on Basque linguistics and philology, later other areas gaining prominence. Its key role was introducing scientific standards, bringing foreign vascology to Spain, re-publishing historical Basque texts and broadening research to new fields. There were 27 volumes published until 1936 and RIEV soon outpaced other, usually ephemeral periodicals as the key platform of vascólogist scientific exchange.

In 1908 Urquijo assumed presidency of Eskualzaleen Biltzarra and galvanized the association. When in 1911 the Gipuzkoan diputación decided to launch its own San Sebastián review promoting the Basque culture, Urquijo was among co-founders of Euskalerriaren Alde; he remained in its executive council and contributed until the periodical closed in 1931. Also in 1911 he was among initiators of the Bayonne-based Cercle d'Etudes Euskariennes and became its president, a short-lived initiative which endured until 1913.

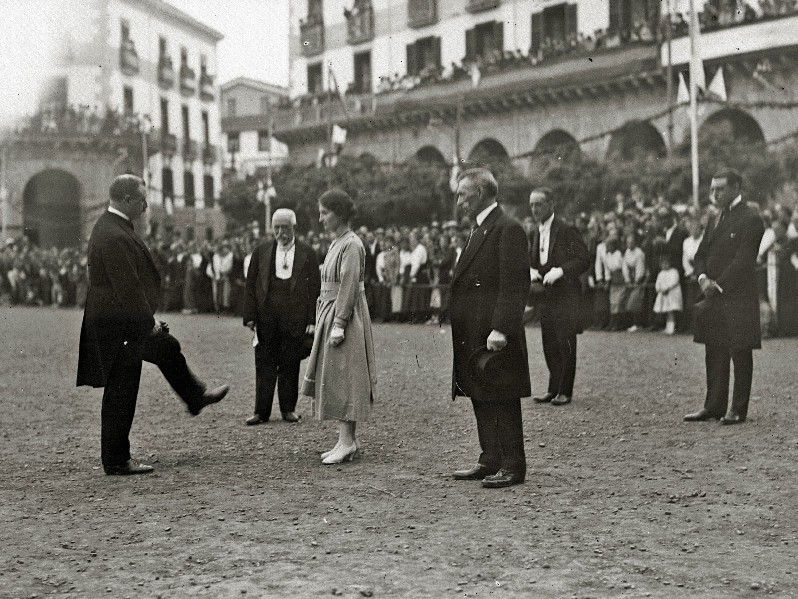
Sociedad de Estudios Vascos being founded, Oñati 1918

In 1918 Urquijo took part in Congress of Basque Studies in Oñati, which resulted in setting up Sociedad de Estudios Vascos, later known as Eusko Ikaskuntza. Some scholars claim that SEV reproduced the format of Basque studies shaped by RIEV; some maintain that SEV was simply born out of the RIEV. Urquijo became its vice-president and member of Language and Literature sections. The organization grew into key Basque cultural institution, eclipsing other vascólogist groupings. In 1919 SEV gave birth to Euskaltzaindia, Royal Academy of the Basque language; Urquijo became one of its 4 academics, Head of Research and Chief Librarian. In 1922 he ceded RIEV ownership to SEV and remained its manager.

In late 1937 Urquijo entered the re-established Nationalist RAE as its secretary, assuming "the second most important academic position" in the Francoist zone; during the first sitting of 1938 he swore loyalty to "Caudillo, Salvador de nuestro pueblo". Together with Azkue he worked to re-launch Euskaltzaindia. In 1941 the body was instituted again, though under new conditions; at verge of nervous breakdown Urquijo remained pessimistic as to the purpose and prospects of the institution. In 1943 Urquijo was among co-founders of Real Sociedad Bascongada de Amigos del País, becoming its chairman. The organization started issuing its review, Eusko Jakintza, in 1945 transformed into the Boletín of RSBAP; Urquijo became its manager.

== Vascólogo: own contribution ==
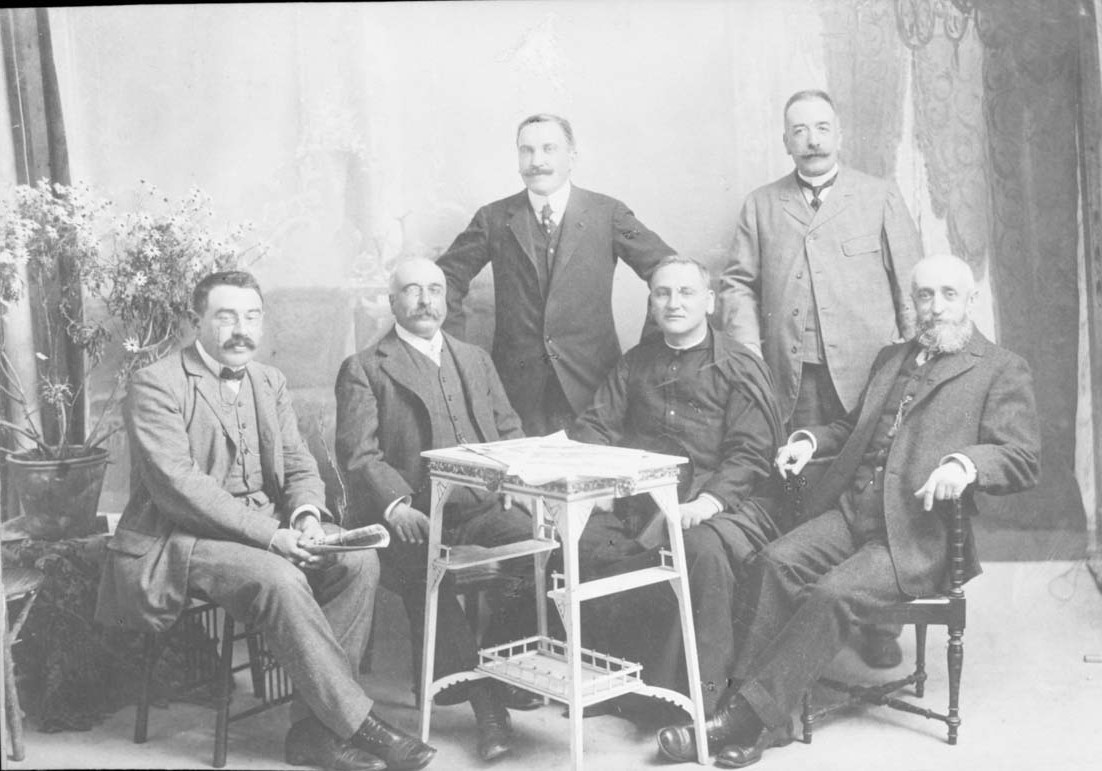
Urquijo (centre) among prominent Basque writers, around 1910

Though one scholar suggested that Urquijo's own production is divided into 4 phases distinguished mostly by institutional milestones, other works do not mention any specific change or evolution of his cultural work, except that he wrote only single pieces prior to 1907 and after 1940. His written contribution is extensive though not massive and covers some 300 titles, including books, articles, reviews, booklets and newspaper items, with most prominent works written between 1922 and 1929.

The key feature of Urquijo's work is its great multifariousness, as his contribution falls into a number of areas: general linguistics, comparative linguistics, paremiology, onomastics, ancient songs and stories, origin of the Basque language, folklore, archaeology, heraldry, etymology, music, literature including poetry, invented universal languages and commercial history of Bilbao, not to count single pieces representing odd and isolated subjects. Another fundamental characteristic is scholarly discipline, especially as opposed to sometimes extravagant and highly hypothetical theories pursued by other vascophiles of the early 20th century.

Though initially Urquijo displayed interest in some very specific topics like evolution of the Sare dialect, over time he specialized in two areas. The first one was bibliography, which suited his systematic nature and together with periodical accounts supplied to RIEV made him emerge as "mayor bibliografo vasco". Another one was paremiology, always generating his particular interest and resulting in a number of publications. Some works add also dialects and their changes over time as another of his preferred subjects.

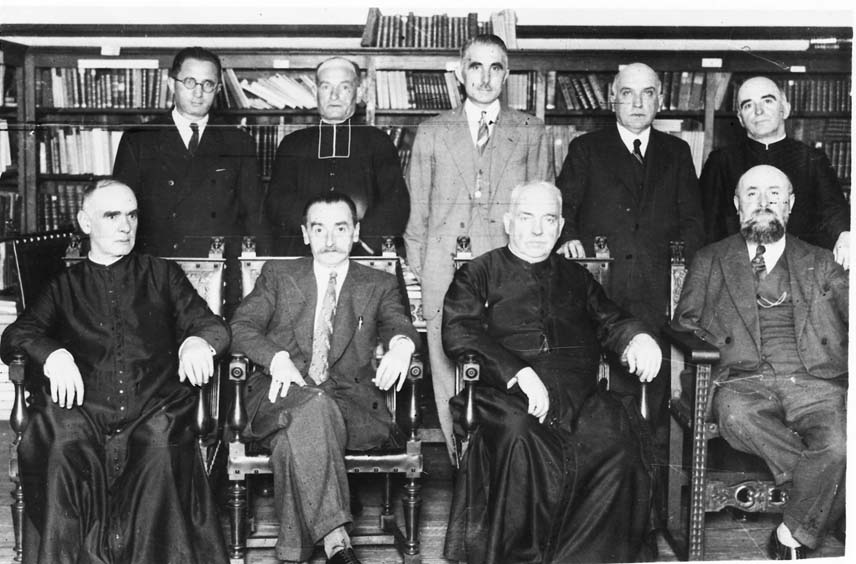
Urquijo (2nd row, 2nd from R) in Euskaltzaindia, 1927

In terms of own writings, Urquijo's contribution was incomparable to production of Azkue, especially that his knowledge and fluency in Basque was far inferior. Contemporary scholars summarise his work as discreet and modest but effective, possibly constrained by his excess self-criticism; they rush to underline that in general, apart from his scholarly production and organizational achievements, Urquijo's contribution consisted to a huge extent of discussion and friendly critique. Some vascólogos even consider his polemical effort as one of key threads of his entire activity, pointing that he did not refrain from and indeed willingly engaged in always amicable disputes with Eleizalde, Baroja and many others.

== Vascólogo: controversies ==
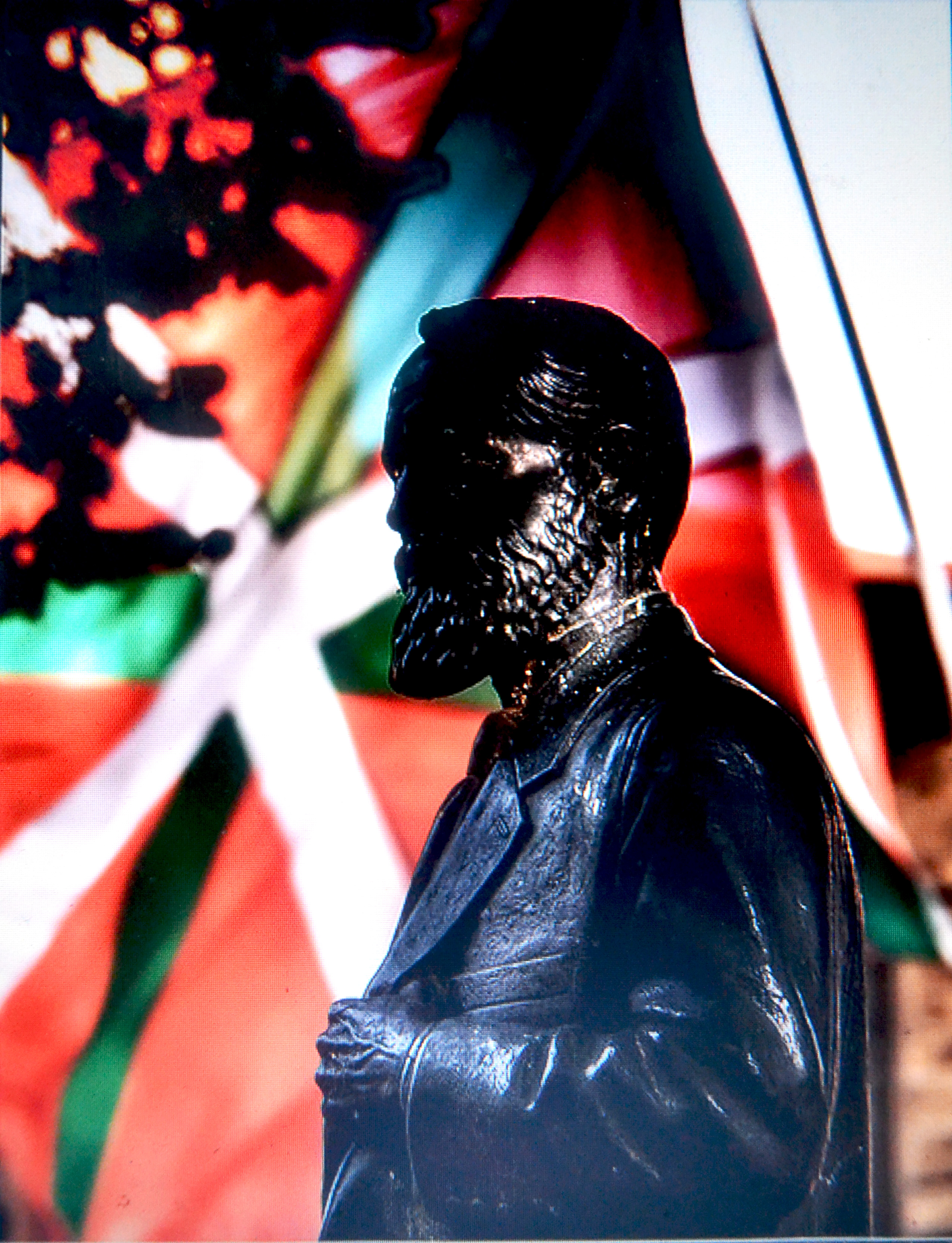
Sabino Arana

As a vascólogo Urquijo was involved in a number of fundamental debates related to the Basque realm. He followed Azkue when confronting the "aranistas". He charged them with pursuing an amateurish and highly speculative approach, resulting in advancing theories which suited their allegedly idealized, Arcadian and almost mythical vision of Basque community; this stance had to be repelled by purely scientific approach. Urquijo's decisiveness in dismantling what he considered myths has even earned him the opinion of an iconoclast. Another line of conflict with the Aranists was their perceived obsession with linguistic purity, entangled in "extravagant etymologies" and "most grotesque hypotheses"; one of the SEV objectives was to wrest the language issue away from zealous nationalists, especially that Urquijo personally appreciated internal variability of Basque dialects. Finally, the area of conflict with Arana and his followers was the cross-linguistic issue. Anchored in a European, cosmopolitan and aristocratic milieu, Urquijo adhered to extremely xenophile approach and envisioned Basque in a wide international cultural context, while Arana was anxious to protect genuine Basque from the outside influence.

A fundamental issue facing SEV was unification of written Basque. For two distinct reasons Urquijo was firmly against taking any action; his scientific focus convinced him there was not enough linguistic evidence to take any course, and his predilection for dialects rendered it impossible to accept their marginalization for the sake of creating a common speak. To him, unification efforts resembled extravagant theories advanced by early vascólogos and purist fixation of the Aranists. On the same basis, he opposed creation of Comisión de Neologismos, as lexical growth was the matter of the pueblo, not the academy. Though Urquijo appreciated the need of an orthodoxy, he did not consider it urgent and preferred to wait and see which dialect prevails. He understood his role as stimulating this process by reprinting traditional Basque works, getting to know the Basque linguistic realm by means of scientific research and promoting the usage of Basque. His stance prevailed, as both SEV and Euskaltzaindia did not adopt any decisive steps. Some scholars claim that unification, finally decided in 1968, developed along the lines envisioned by Urquijo.

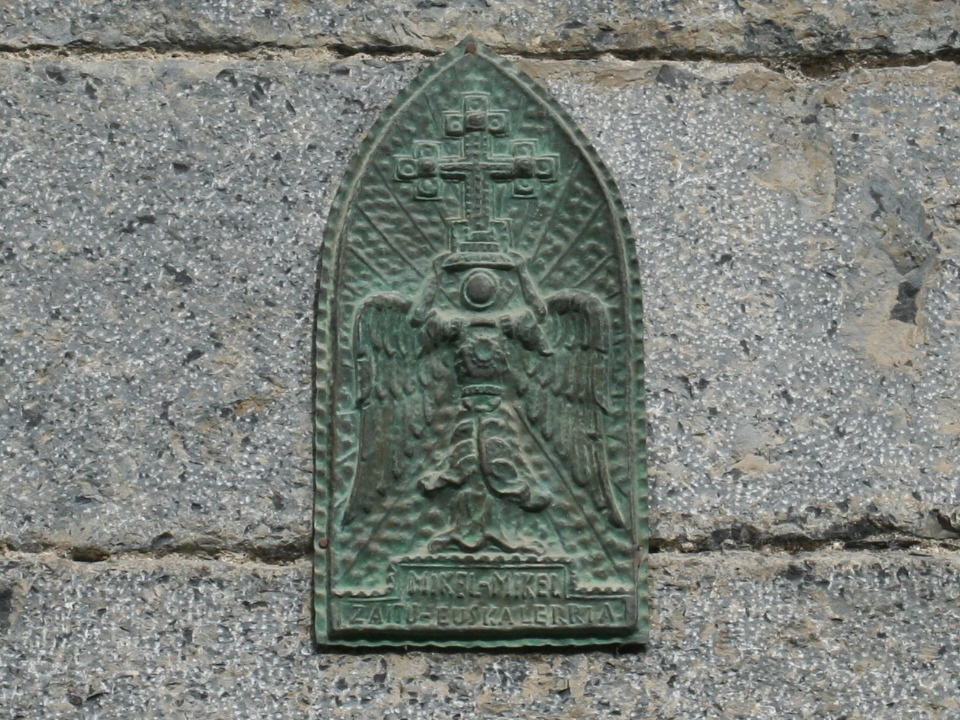
Vasconia tradicional

Later-day vascólogos commented that SEV was tilted towards "Vasconia tradicional que de la Vasconia real" and suggested that Urquijo was heavily responsible for the bias. It is also evident that following the course set by RIEV, SEV formatted its profile as focused on scientific research, somewhat leaning towards historical analysis, and refrained from assuming regulatory and normative role. This might have been heavily influenced by the vision of linguistics harbored by Urquijo. This could have been also the result of his wish to steer clear of potential conflict areas, such as nagging present-day issues, which might have wrecked SEV's impartiality and damaged its blank political profile. This did not spare Urquijo and SEV the charge of ideological bias. Though expressed first during late Francoism in somewhat Aesopian language, the point was that confessional nature of Basque cultural institutions of that era was incompatible with strictly neutral stand.

== Vascólogo: reception and legacy ==
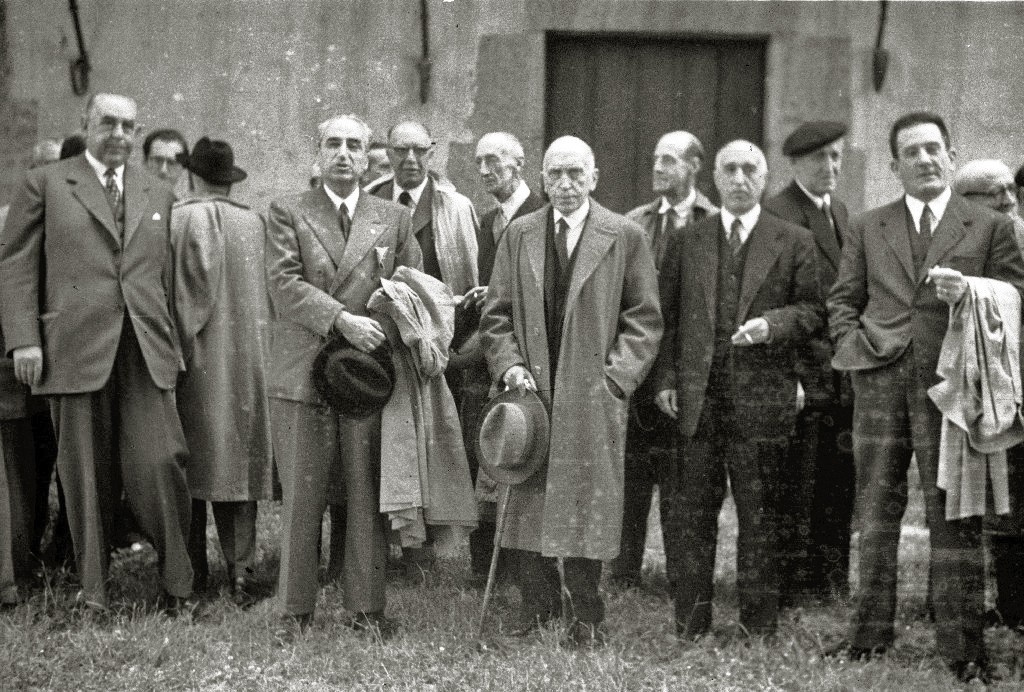
homage to Urquijo, 1949

Already in the early 20th century Urquijo started to gain wide recognition as a scholar. In 1909 nominated academico correspondiente of Real Academia de la Historia and member of a number of prestigious bodies, in 1924 he was named doctor honoris causa by University of Bonn. In 1927 he was invited to Real Academia de la Lengua Española, Sección de Lenguas Regionales, which he joined formally in 1929. In the 1930s his home, and especially its vast library, was considered "el Sancta Sanctorum de la tradición vasca", Urquijo himself named "su sumo sacerdote". In 1942 he moved as catedratico to Salamanca to commence his only teaching episode. In 1949 he was declared hijo benemerito by the province of Gipuzkoa, with appropriate celebrations and the local Diputación publishing 3 volumes of homage materials. The same year he was awarded Gran Cruz de Orden Civil de Alfonso X el Sabio. He died due to heart disease.

In 1954, largely thanks to efforts of another Carlist vascólogo Antonio Arrue, the Gipuzkoan diputación set up Seminario de Filología Vasca "Julio de Urquijo", which soon started to issue its yearbook; the unit is very much active until today. The reborn Euskaltzaindia staged centenary celebrations of his birth in 1971, with a homage session and related publication. His vast library was incorporated as Fondo Urquijo into the Koldo Mitxelena Kulturunea foundation, enhanced to 8,000 monographs and 11,000 other pieces. There are a few streets commemorating him in Spain, especially in his native area, Deusto, though he earned no monument so far.

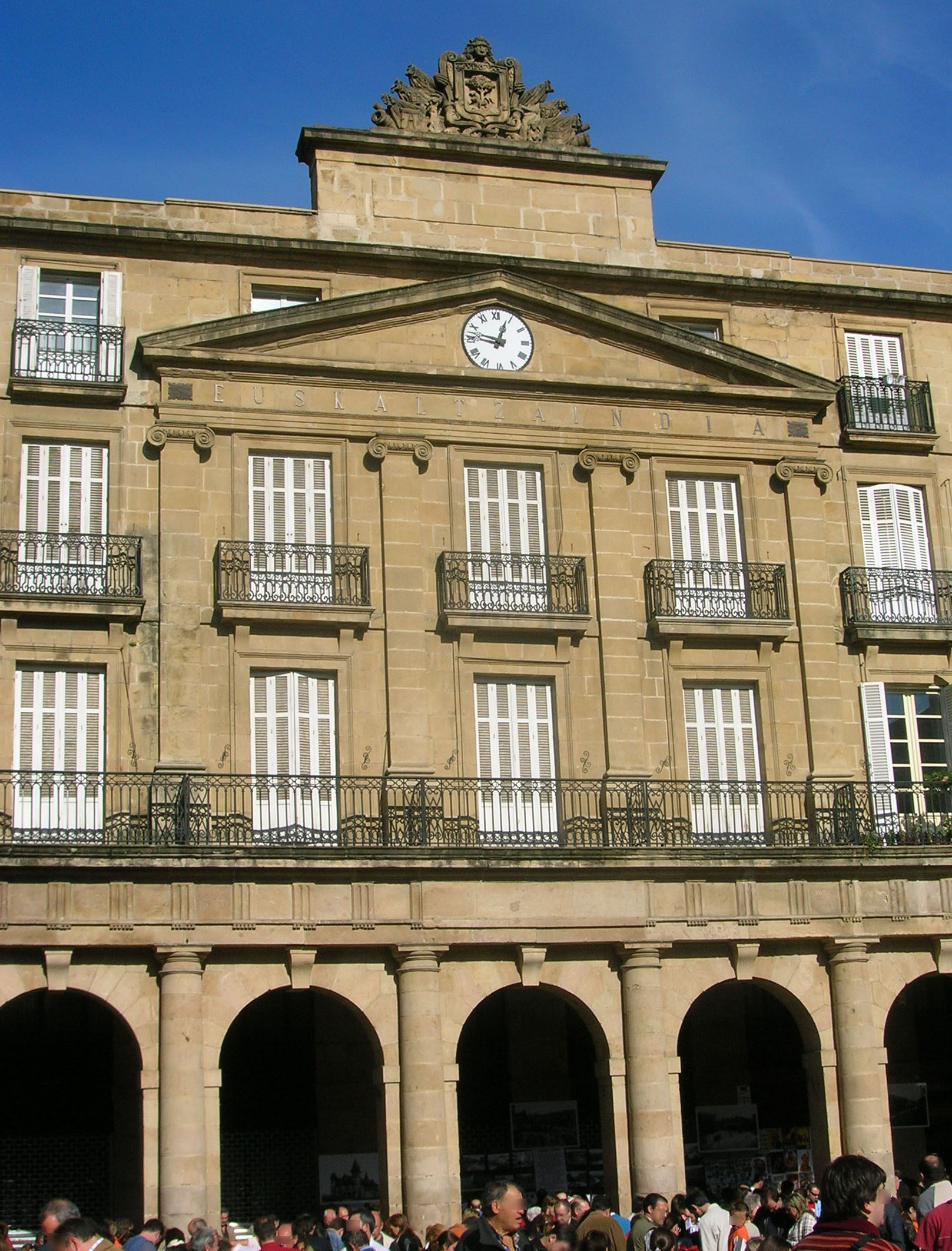
Euskaltzaindia site today

By present-day scholars Urquijo is considered an iconic figure of the Basque cultural revival. With Sabino Arana, Miguel de Unamuno, Resurrección Azkue and Arturo Campión he is listed as one of key individuals leading the movement in the late 19th century; other scholars consider him, together with Azkue and Aranzadi, one of 3 or, including Campión, one of 4 fundamental personalities of Basque culture during the early 20th century. Unanimously hailed in public discourse, also in the highly militant Basque cultural-political milieu Urquijo seems to stay beyond any criticism. Even when acknowledged as member of the reactionary Carlist movement he is absolved as tolerant, liberal and reformist.

== See also ==
- Villa Arbelaiz
