= Antonio Arrúe Zarauz =

Basque writer (born 1903)

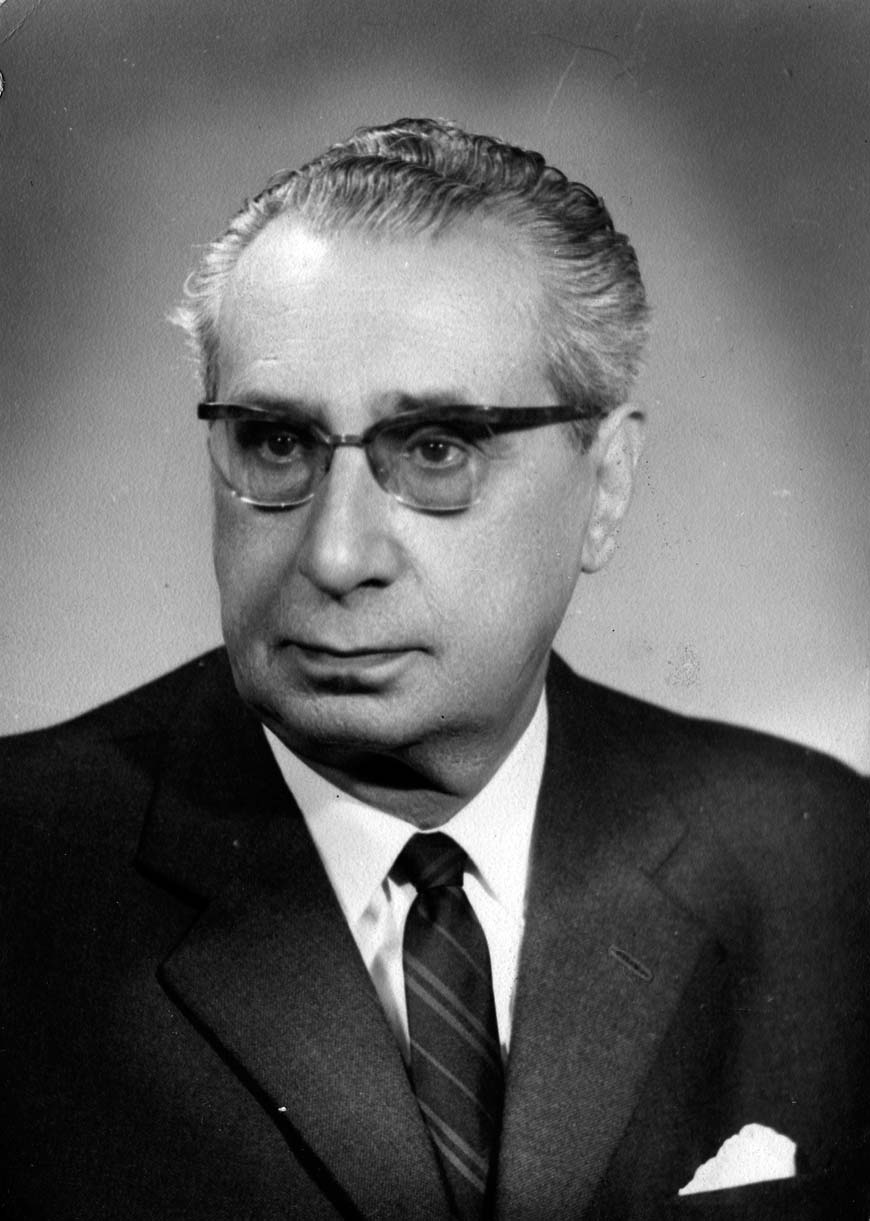
- Born: Antonio Arrúe Zarauz; 1903; Asteasu, Spain
- Died: 1976 (aged 72–73); San Sebastian, Spain
- Occupation: lawyer
- Known for: Basque activist, politician
- Political party: Comunión Tradicionalista

Antonio Arrúe Zarauz (1903–1976) was a Spanish politician and a Basque cultural activist. Politically he was a Carlist militant throughout all of his life; in the 1950s and 1960s Arrue informally led the Gipuzkoan branch of the party, and from 1957 to 1959 he held the official Traditionalist jefatura in the province. From 1967 to 1971 he served in the Cortes elected from the so-called tercio familiar. He contributed to Basque culture mostly as organizer and administrator, during the Francoist era engaged especially in Euskaltzaindia. His input as linguist or ethnographer is moderate, though he excelled as one of the best Basque-language orators of his time.

== Family and youth ==
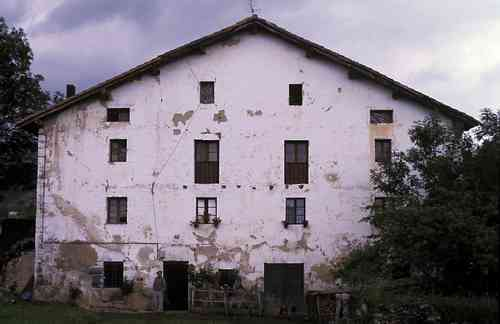
Arrúe's family house, Asteasu

Antonio Arrúe Zarauz was born in the Elizmendi quarter of Asteasu, a small town near Tolosa in the Gipuzkoa province, in the region then known as Vascongadas. None of the sources consulted offers any information on his parents, except that his father, Juan Arrúe, was the first organist in the local San Pedro church; he also served in a number of nearby villages and towns giving lessons. Correct spelling of Antonio's mother's surname is disputed. It is not clear whether the family was in any way related to a number of known contemporary Basques bearing the same name, esp. the Arrúe Valle brothers and the Franciscan musician, José Arrúe. Antonio and his two sisters, Eleuteria and Dolores, were raised in a profoundly Catholic ambience.

The young Antonio obtained his bachillerato in the Lecároz college, run by the Capuchin friars in Elizondo, in the Navarrese region of Valle de Baztán, few miles from the French frontier. In the early 1920s he studied in Oviedo, enrolled at the Faculty of Law in the local university. None of the sources consulted gives exact dates of his academic period. Following graduation he returned to Gipuzkoa and started the career as a lawyer. It is not clear when and where he opened the office; he is first reported by the newspapers as “a young lawyer from Asteasu” in the early 1930s.

In 1941 Arrúe married María Teresa Salazar, a native of Tolosa. The couple settled in San Sebastián; Antonio continued with his law practice, opening the business in the very centre of the city; gradually he specialized in rural rent and heritage issues, working with a number of local companies, associations and institutions. María initially served as a secretary in his law office, later on to work as a seamstress in the garment shop, run by her mother. They had 3 daughters, Maite, María Ignacia and María Carmen. Their only son, Juan María Arrúe Salazar, became a well known donostian lawyer and is referred to as a specialist in urbanismo.

== Early career ==
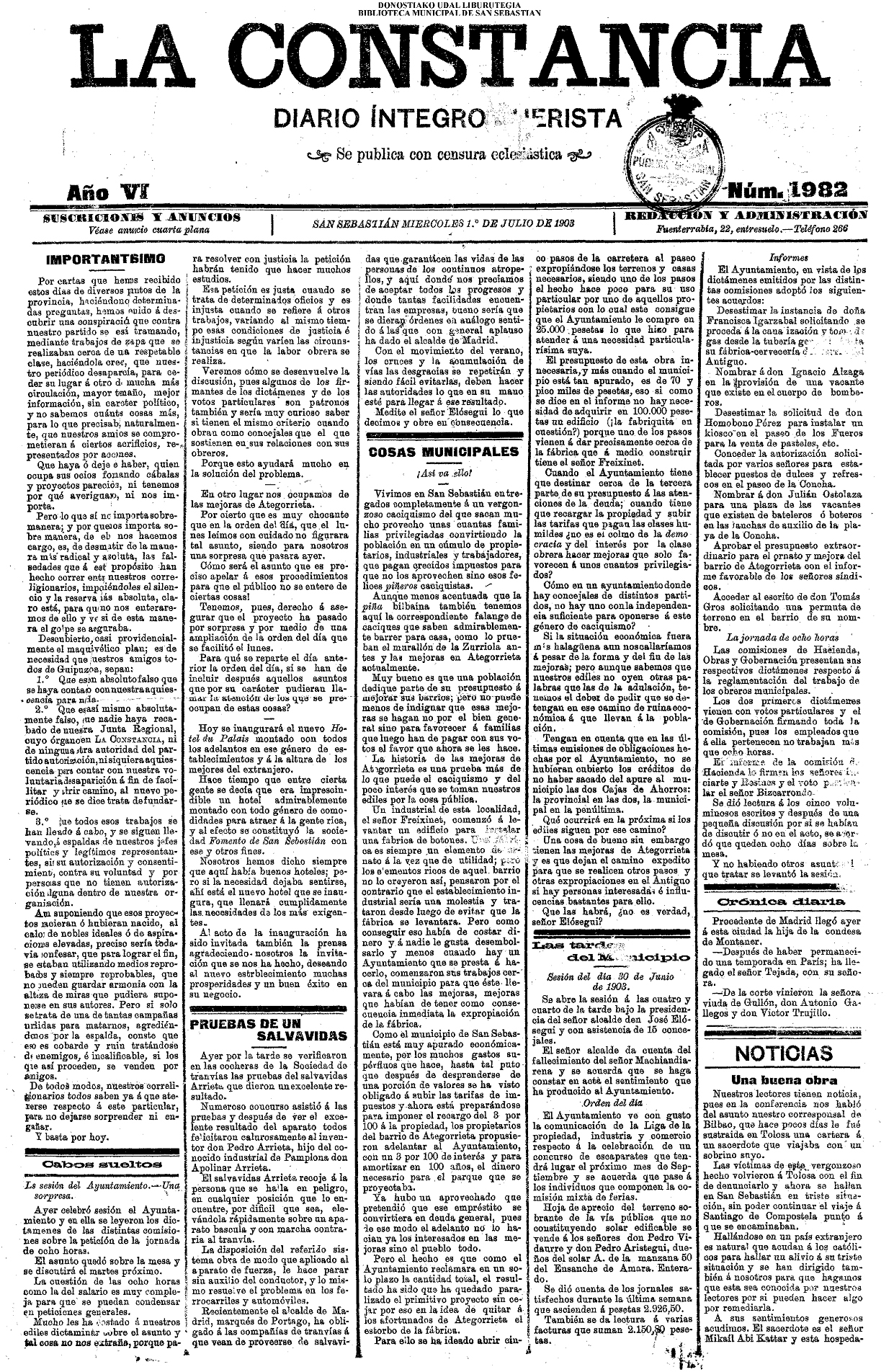
La Constancia

It is not clear whether Arrúe has inherited Traditionalist outlook from his ancestors – like most Carlists in Basque-Navarrese area have – or whether he embraced it during the schooling and academic years. None of the sources consulted offers also any clue as to which branch of the movement he joined in the 1920s, the Jaimistas, the Mellistas or the Integristas, though it is the latter group which seems most probable. Asteasu was in the very centre of the Integrist national stronghold, composed of Tolosa and Azpeitia districts; an Anastasio Arrúe was jefe of the local Tolosan Integrist junta, and a Pedro Arrúe was its treasurer; Antonio's father as an organist was closely related to the parochial clergy; finally, in the early 1930s Antonio commenced collaboration with La Constancia, the local Gipuzkoan Integrist daily, later editing its newly introduced section in Basque.

Arrúe became a public figure after the three Traditionalist streams merged into a united Carlist organization, Comunión Tradicionalista, in 1932. In 1933 he was already reported as an active speaker at local Carlist meetings, mostly in minor Gipuzkoan localities like Isasondo. In the summer of 1934 his activity became indeed hectic and was recorded also in major cities like San Sebastian. Soon gaining recognition as “notable orador”, Arrúe delivered vibrant harangues in Basque that sparked the enthusiasm of the audience. His speeches covered key Carlist topics: siding with the Church against Republican secularization, hailing Gipuzkoan caserios as bulwarks of loyalty, defending traditionalist monarchy as a warrant of regional fueros and confronting Basque nationalism as illusory and deceptive; there were also some social threads present. He spoke firmly against the autonomy draft, denouncing it as "antivasco, antiforal y exótico". Nominated secretary of the Carlist Junta Provincial of Gipuzkoa, he continued with public appearances – already dubbed “infatigable secretario” – throughout 1935 and early 1936.

== Civil War ==
campaign in Gipuzkoa

It is not clear whether Arrúe contributed either to Carlist military buildup or political preparations to the July 1936 coup, as neither himself nor any of the sources consulted provides any related information. Once it became clear the insurgency failed in Gipuzkoa he went into hiding and resurfaced when the Carlist troops conquered the province. As the Junta Provincial was transformed into the wartime Traditionalist provincial body, Junta Carlista de Guerra of Gipuzkoa, Arrúe resumed his duties of its secretary. Some time late 1936 or early 1937 he became acting president of this body, as its February 1937 documents are already signed by him as "presidente en funciones".

Arrúe soon became disillusioned by military rule in the Nationalist zone, growing particularly anxious about preponderance of Falange in Gipuzkoa and about centralizing designs of the regime, perceived as a threat to Traditionalism, Basque culture and provincial identity. Already in October 1936 the Gipuzkoan Junta Carlista de Guerra, animated by Arrúe, voiced publicly against composition of the provincial comision gestora, bluntly stating that there are two wars: one in the trenches, and one in the corridors of power. Early 1937 he tried to co-ordinate a joint effort of Navarrese, Gipuzkoan and Biscay juntas, aimed at countering falangism and ensuring that provincial fueros do not suffer. Faced with growing threat of amalgamating Carlism within a monopolist state party, just a week between the Unification Decree he signed a circular, urging every Gipuzkoan Carlist to maintain loyalty to the Comunión.

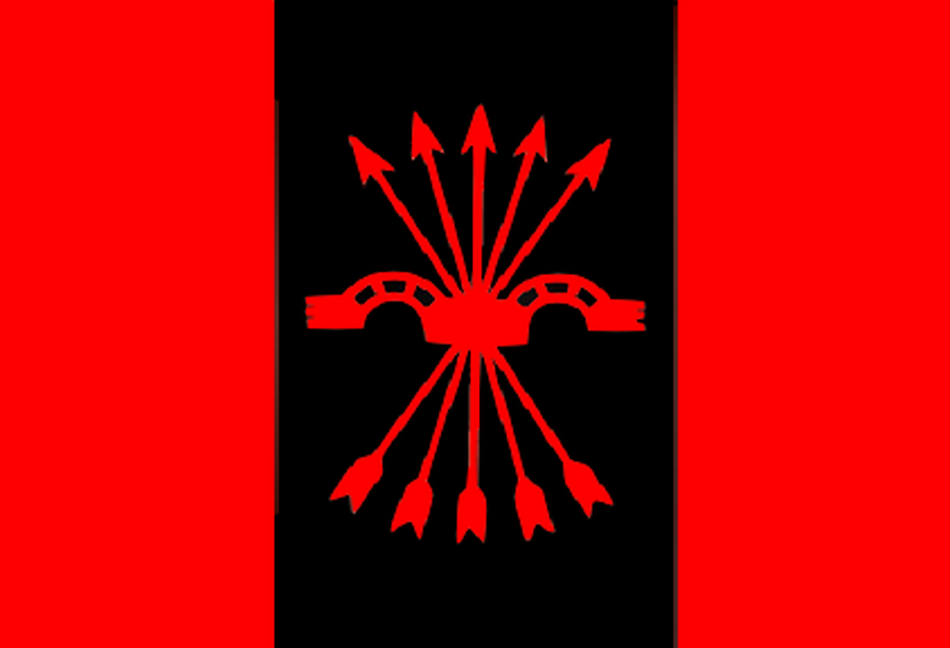
Falangist standard

Once Franco decreed abolishment of all parties and their unification within FET, Arrúe decided simply to ignore it. When the new Carlist regent, Don Javier, entered Spain in mid-May, Arrúe accompanied him across Gipuzkoa. On May 19, 1937, he took part in first of the two most emotional moments of his political career: Don Javier swearing at the Guernica oak to conform to and protect the traditional Basque fueros. The pledge soon suffered a major setback when, following the conquest of Biscay, Franco scrapped the provincial concierto economico in June 1937. Standoff between the military and Carlism continued as Don Javier re-entered Spain in November; Arrúe was appointed his personal secretary, touring the frontlines and making 4,000 km across Vascongadas, Castile, Extremadura and Andalusia. In December 1937 the adventure came to an abrupt end when in Granada Arrúe was reached by the military detention order; only thanks to intervention of collaborationist Carlists he was allowed to make it to the Burgos prison himself instead of having been escorted in handcuffs by Guardia Civil. It is not clear how much time he spent behind bars; released, he returned to Asteasu to lead Carlist opposition to falangisation of the province.

== Early Francoism ==
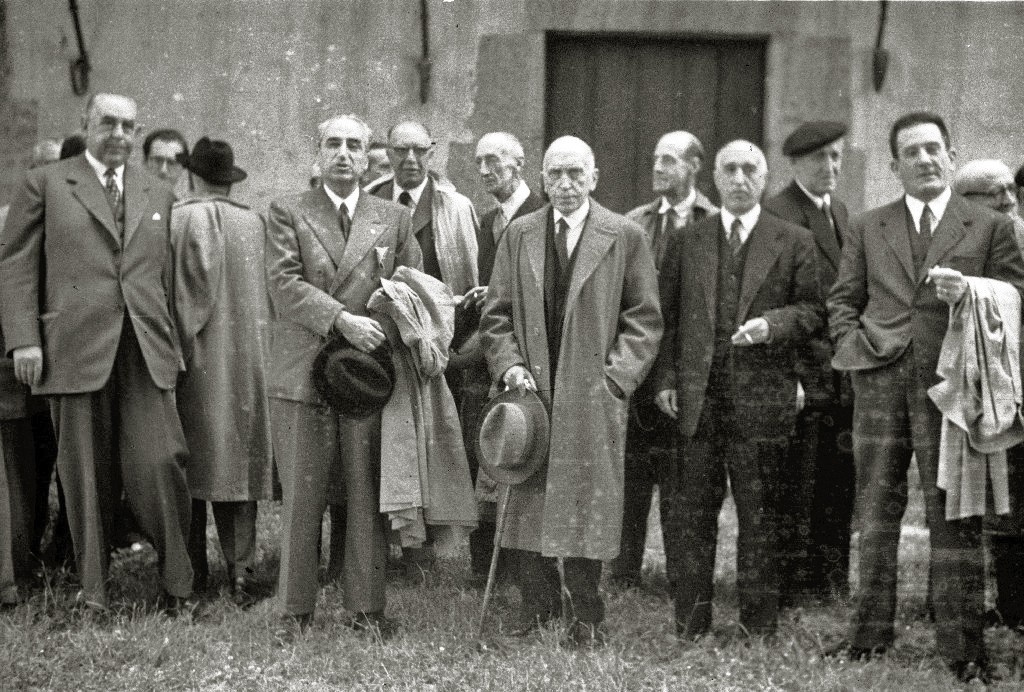
Arrue during homage to vascologist Julio Urquijo, Azcoitia 1949

One scholar suggests that having moved with his newly wed wife to San Sebastián, Arrúe rejected proposals to live off perks and administrative positions. Instead, he joined the anti-collaborationist Carlist faction loyal to Don Javier, and threw himself into rebuilding the independent Traditionalist network in the province. In 1940 he was appointed the representative of Gipuzkoa in a 4-member interregional vasco-navarrese junta; the same year the Carlist political leader Manuel Fal Conde suggested he joins executive board of Editorial Navarra, the Carlist publishing house disguised as a commercial enterprise. In August 1942 as head of the Gipuzkoan junta he signed a manifesto prior to planned official celebrations commemorating the siege of Tolosa; the document urged loyalty to Don Javier and Fal, claiming that the future of Spain lies only with Carlism. As the event turned into riots between Carlists and Falangists, Arrúe – accused also of pro-Allies sympathies - was expulsed from Gipuzkoa and ordered a year of exile in Gijón.

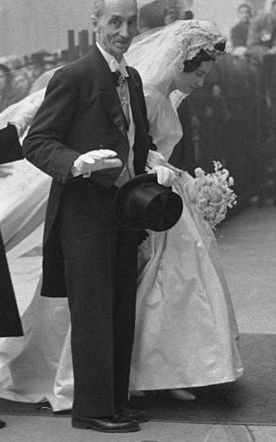
Don Javier, 1960

In late 1940s Carlism lost its influence on Gipuzkoan Diputación, FET and major local ayuntamientos. Having returned to San Sebastían Arrúe resumed his semi-official Carlist activities; as the movement decomposed into many factions, he stayed loyal to Fal and the regent. He was with those judging that the regency aroused little enthusiasm amongst the rank-and-file and merely encouraged damaging dynastical competition; hence, he preferred that Don Javier announces his personal claim to the throne, which indeed took place in 1952.

Arrúe maintained very good relations with the Carlist political leader; he shared Fal's intransigence on dynastical and anti-Francoist issues, while Fal shared and supported Arrúe's drive to promote the Basque identity. Though in 1953 the Gipuzkoan junta was reconstituted under Ignacio Ruz de Prada and with Pablo Iturria as its secretary, it was in fact Arrúe remaining the provincial leader. One scholar suggests that Arrúe conspired against Fal, considering him too conventional in his anti-Francoist bid; if this is the case indeed, the ensuing deposition of Fal and collaborationist turn of mid-1950s caught Arrúe bitterly disappointed; he was leaning to a Sivattista dissidence. With José María Valiente emerging as a new national jefe, in 1956 Arrúe tried to oppose his course by forming Junta del Regiones; this semi-rebellious body was bent on preventing rapprochement with Francoism and envisioned a loose alliance of Carlists, nationalists, regionalists, Catholics and even some sectors of the Falange. The junta proved to be short-lived and some of its participants soon backtracked when challenged by Valiente, but Arrúe did not. In 1957 as Gipuzkoan jefe he automatically entered the newly formed Junta de Gobierno de la Comunión and kept confronting the new leader, accusing him of betraying the Carlist spirit. In early 1959 he resigned as jefe of Gipuzkoan Carlism, quoting disagreement with policy of the new Secretariat.

== Late Francoism ==
Carlist standard

The Gipuzkoan command was temporarily assumed by junta's vice-president, Luis Zuazola, but the Carlist king did not appoint a new jefe. In the early 1960s Arrúe remained the soul of provincial Traditionalism, apparently driving from the back seat though also assuming one-day prestigious ceremonial roles. When the claimant decided to compete with Basque nationalism by setting up an inter-regional Vasco-Navarrese council named Junta Foral Superior in 1961, Arrúe was considered an obvious representative of Gipuzkoa and a leading candidate to head the entire body. His opponents considered Arrúe a power-hungry Carlist version of Aguirre, keen to build his Vascongadas fiefdom, and as there were no suitable counter-candidates, the idea of Junta Foral was eventually abandoned. In 1962 José Aramburu was formally appointed jefe provincial.

Sidetracking of Arrúe was acknowledged by the regime, always keen to exploit differences within various political groupings, by awarding him Orden del Mérito Civil in 1964. In mid-1960s Arrúe, from 1957 supporting Carlist prince Carlos Hugo, neared the group of his young entourage. He engaged in their new publishing house Ediciones Montejurra and in the spring of 1967 was rewarded with the privilege of addressing the annual Montejurra amassment, the key event in Huguista strategy of grabbing power within the Comunión and a promotional stage for Carlos Hugo himself. Speaking as usual in Basque he focused on regional rights, though his lecture arose little enthusiasm and there were even some jeers recorded.

In late 1967 Arrúe stood as a Carlist in the newly introduced, semi-free elections to the Cortes from the so-called Tercio Familiar, and defeated the governmental candidates in Gipuzkoa. He immediately carried into the parliament the just-launched campaign to re-introduce concierto economico, though despite attempts to mount some public pressure, the initiative came to nothing producing only minor alterations to the original abolition law. As part of a hardly veiled dissident strategy, Arrúe joined procuradores who, unable to get adequate hearing in the chamber, staged rump informal sessions across the country; this “Cortes transhumantes” was formally banned in 1968. In early 1969, together with 3 fellow Carlist MPs, Arrúe protested expulsion of Don Javier and Carlos Hugo.

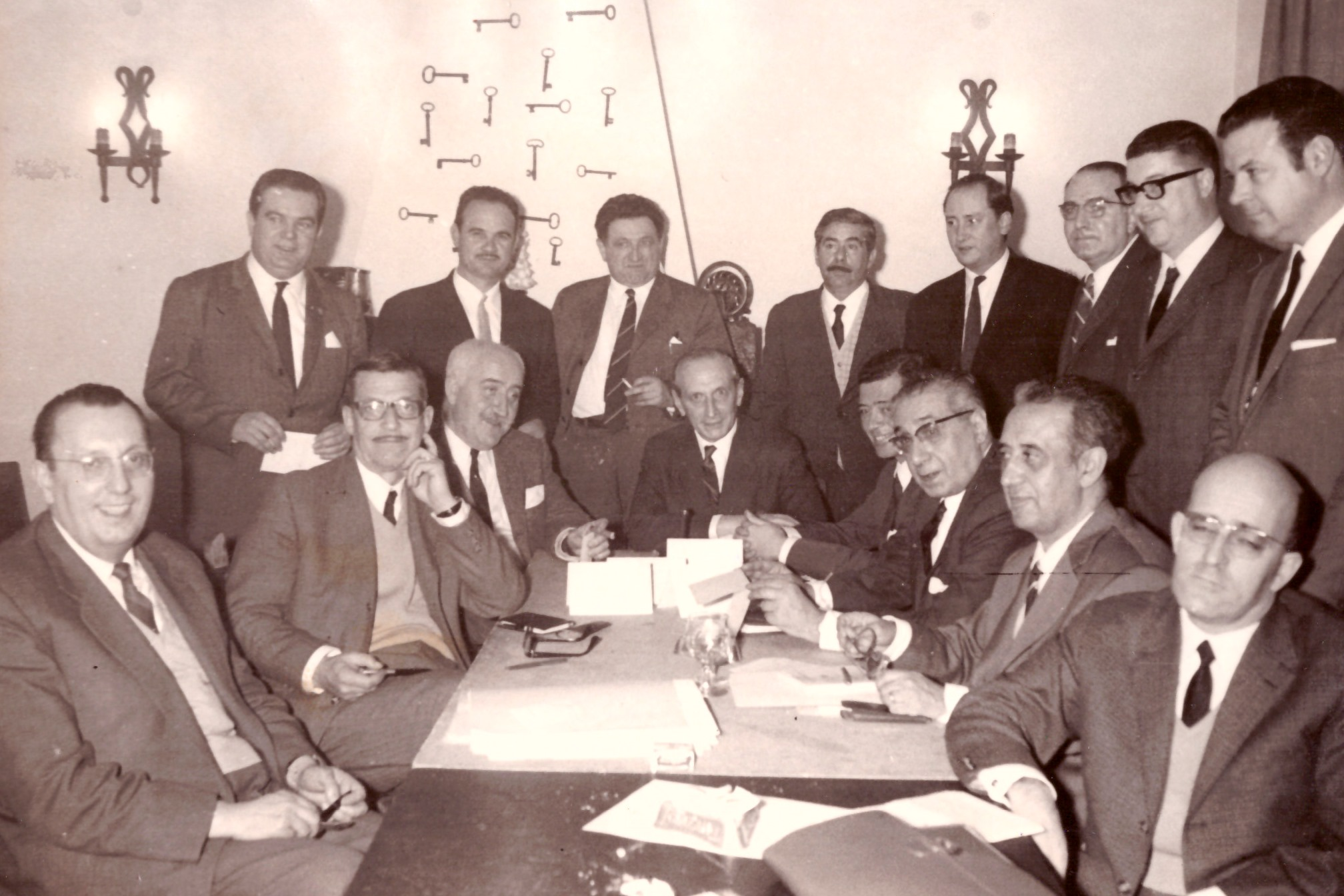
Arrue at Cortes trashumantes, 1968

On July 22, 1969, Arrúe recorded the second of the two most emotional moments in his political career: in an open, one-by-one Cortes voting in front of Franco he voiced against Juan Carlos de Borbón as the future king of Spain. Paradoxically, at that time he was increasingly alienated by the pro-democratic turn of the dynasty he remained loyal to. Though when in 1970 Carlos Hugo established his Gabinete Ideologico, Arrúe joined its foral commission, he remained in this body no longer than until 1971. Following a scandal related to re-election negotiations of the Navarrese MPs, he broke up with Partido Carlista, now firmly controlled by the socialist progressists, and did not run in the 1971 elections. He kept considering himself a Traditionalist and an immense portrait of the Carlist king Javier I remained in his office.

== Basque: promoter and organizer ==
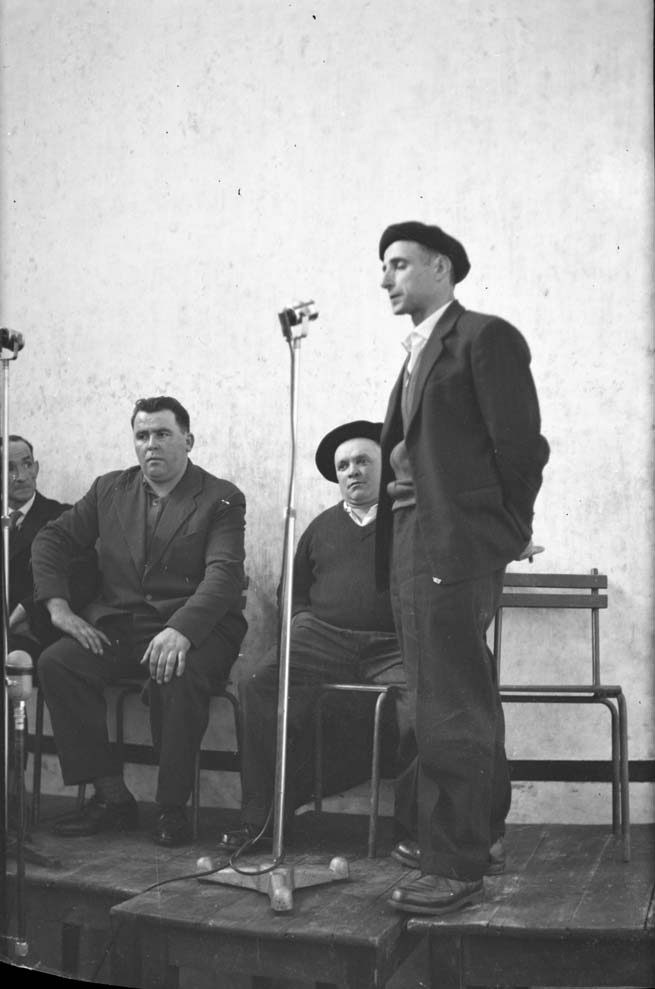
Xalbador, Arrue's favorite bertsolari

Arrúe's mother tongue was Basque and he spoke Basque also with his own children. Little is known about his early views on the Basque question. In the 1930s he firmly opposed PNV and its political ambitions, confronting them with a traditionalist vision of foral Euskalerria as an integral part of Spain; simultaneously he stood out by delivering all his speeches in Basque, at that time practiced only by some PNV politicians. As a leading Carlist politician in Gipuzkoa, during the Civil War and in the 1940s he showed a concern for Basque culture and for Basque provincial rights, though not for Basque political ambitions.

As some pre-war Basque cultural institutions were getting re-established in the Francoist Spain, Arrúe was increasingly engaged in their activities. In 1953 he assumed co-directorship of Egan, a review issued by Real Academia Vascongada de Amigos del País. It is in Egan that in 1954 he started to publish a regular column dedicated to cuisine and maintained for over 20 years. The same year he commemorated fellow Carlist vascologist Julio Urquijo Ibarra by facilitating foundation of a Basque philology institute bearing his name. When Euskaltzaindia, the Basque language academy, managed to regain its precarious legal standing in the early 1950s, Arrúe neared the institution, to join it formally in 1954. As a lawyer and a politician he was instrumental in organizing its first congress in Aránzazu in 1956, overcoming a number of legal, administrative and political obstacles. He also presided over many of its sessions and was key to engineering the follow-up, vital to the re-launching of Euskaltzaindia after the Civil War.

Relieved from political Carlist duties, in the late 1950s Arrúe fully dedicated himself to Euskaltzaindia. He was the moving spirit behind its newly established commission dedicated to bertsolarism and promoted the genre by organizing local qualifications, leading up to the final contest formatted as a major San Sebastián cultural event in 1960, 1962, 1965 and 1967. He was also a jury member, in case of discrepancies his vote often prevailing. He facilitated a number of editorial initiatives, acknowledged in particular for the Zavala's 1961 launch of Colección Auspoa series and the 1964 re-print of Gero, a monumental 17th century Basque literary work. Some authors claim he also helped to push many works through the Francoist censorship. As an author he popularized Basque culture by writing to La Voz de España, Egan, Euskera, Eusko Gogoa, El Fuerista, Zeruko Argia and by delivering public lectures.

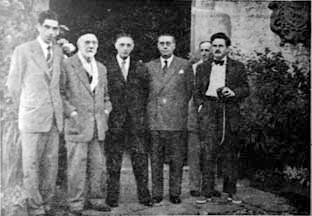
Arrúe, Baroja and Caro Baroja, 1955

In 1966 he was among initiators of the Euskaltzaindia memorandum to the Ministry of Education, suggesting pilot Basque classes in public schools, limited bilingualism in primary schools and graduation Basque classes in universities, apart from state subventions and limited introduction of Basque in official public use. As a lawyer Arrúe assisted in Aránzazu congress of 1968, vital for building the unified Basque language. In 1969, when Euskaltzaindia's legal standing was challenged, he threw himself into massive lawyer's work, resulting in forming its firm juridical basis in 1972.

== Basque: theorist and practitioner ==
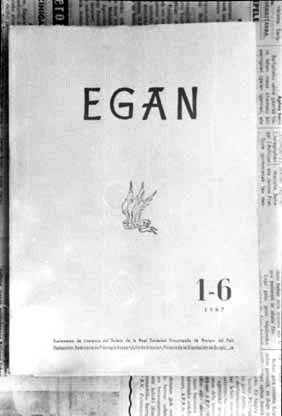
Egan, 1967

Arrúe, an amateur with no professional background either in linguistics or ethnography, was in the second row of those scientifically contributing to the Basque culture. His works – articles published in Basque- and Spanish-language periodicals, mostly in Egan – are loosely scattered across many disciplines: history of Basque literature, history of Basque linguistics, grammar of Basque language, Basque dialectology, history of Basque social movement, Basque anthropology, theory of contemporary Basque poetry, Basque history, Basque cuisine and foreign literature; it was only the question of Basque political ambitions that he avoided – at least in the Francoist Spain – and usually approached only as part of the Carlist history.

Arrúe's role in theoretical development of the Basque language and culture is perhaps dwarfed by his practical contribution. Since the 1930s he has been hailed by media, colleagues and Vascófilos as a great speechmaker, who has not only transplanted spoken Basque from barns to congress halls, but also brought it to unprecedented rhetorical mastery. Considered one of the best Basque orators of his time, he was acknowledged not for highly emotional inflammatory style, but rather for smoothness, sense of humor, vivacity and fluidity. His practical contribution to written Basque, apart from scientific articles, covers also short poems, usually humorous light pieces like a praise of the Jerez sherry, occasionally winning prizes during local contests.

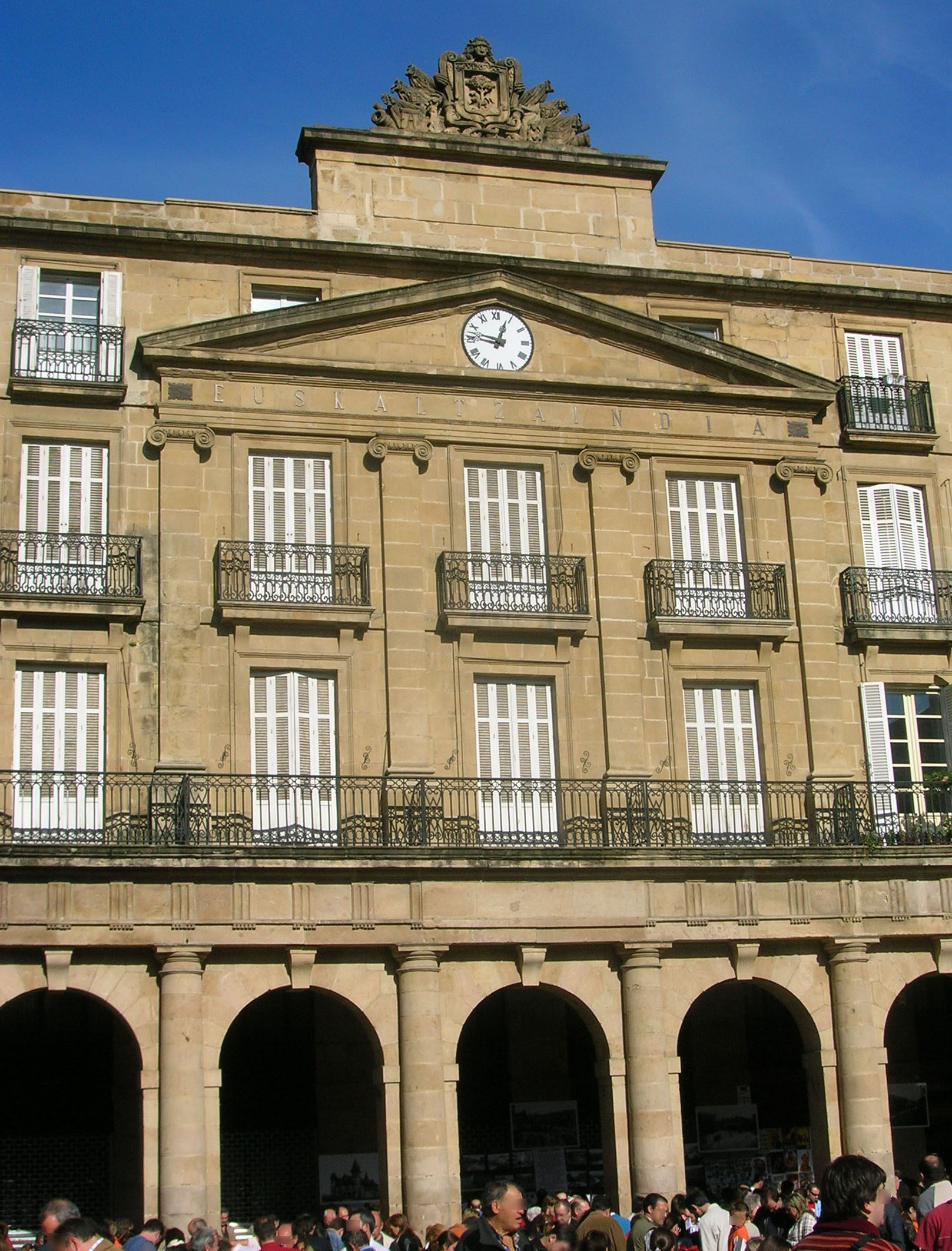
Euskaltzaindia site

== Basque: reception and legacy ==
Arrúe remained a rather forgotten figure until a compilation of his works was released in 2008 and triggered some follow up both in media and in historiography. According to the recently published works his contribution to the Basque cause is highly controversial. It remains beyond any doubt that he opposed independent Basque political ambitions, defended integrity of Spain and has always considered the Basques part of the Spanish political nation; different views pertain to his intentions and to his impact on Basque culture and Basque national development.

In some studies Arrúe is presented as “one of us”, a Basque who trapped in political maze of his time did his best to promote Basque culture against the hostile background of Francoist regime. He is credited mostly for his support as organizer, lawyer and politician, a person who delivered an umbrella sheltering Basque institutions and enabling cultural development, shaped and directed by the others.

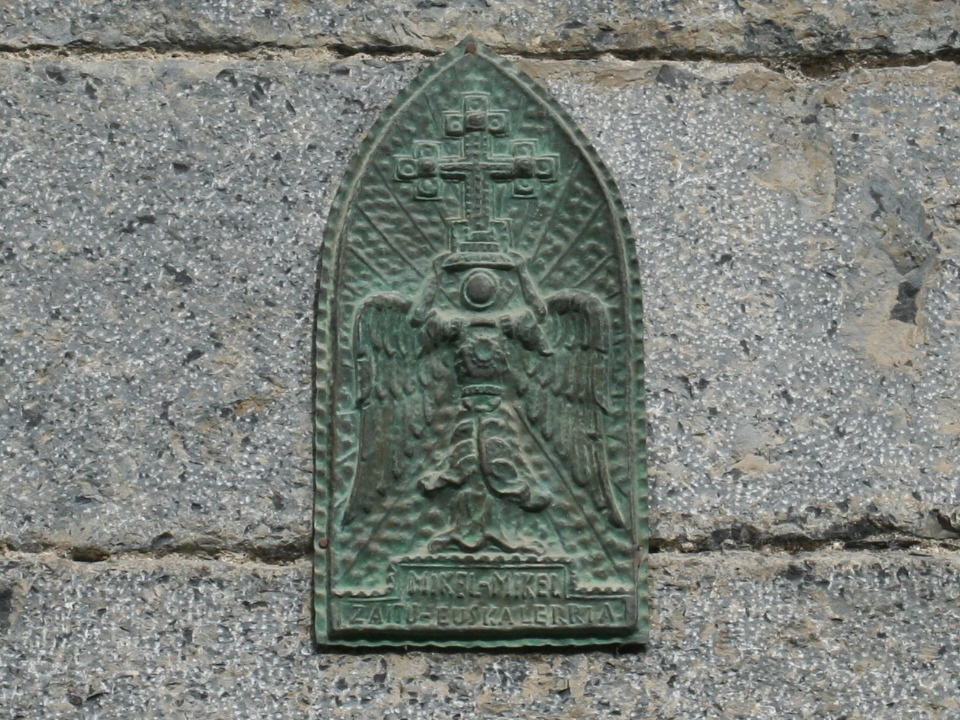
Euskalerria 2014

In some studies Arrúe is presented as “a vascófilo within the regime”, a person who tried to accommodate Basque cultural ambitions within the Francoist system. In this perspective, Arrúe appears to be either someone whose contribution was merely a byproduct of his Carlist political leaning, someone who unintentionally promoted the cause, or someone who was used by the Basques to pursue their cultural and national goals.

In some studies Arrúe is presented as a badly reputed "Asteasu beltza". Adherent to a backward ideology, he censored the Basque literature, forced pro-Francoist distortions, promoted clericalism, sponsored Spanish lexical intrusions into Basque, obstructed disliked people and publications and manipulated bertsolari contests in terms of their winners and in terms of their public reception. In a nutshell, according to this view Arrúe was nothing less than a Francoist “political commissar” delegated to Euskaltzaindia, and his activity remained detrimental to Basque national development.

== See also ==
- Carlism
- Traditionalism
- Euskaltzaindia
- Egan
