= Alfonso Beorlegui Canet =

Colonel in the Spanish Army

- Born: Alfonso Beorlegui y Canet; 26 January 1888; Navarra, Kingdom of Spain
- Died: 29 September 1936 (aged 48); Huesca, Spanish Republic
- Education: Toledo Infantry Academy
- Military career
- Allegiance: (Spain) Kingdom of Spain; Second Spanish Republic; Nationalist faction
- Branch: Spanish Army
- Service years: 1913-1936
- Rank: Colonel
- Units: 28th Luchana Infantry Regiment; Alfonso XII Jaeger Regiment; Group of Regular Forces Of Mellia; Group of Regular Forces of Tetuán; 2/14 America Regiment; 2nd Legion Bandera; 77th Infantry Regiment; 8th Mountain Jaeger Battalion; Civil Guard of Navarre
- Commands: 8th Mountain Jaeger Battalion; Civil Guard of Navarre
- Conflicts: Rif War; Jaca Uprising; Spanish Civil War: Campaign of Gipuzkoa; Battle of Irún (DOW)
- Awards: Individual Military Medal

Alfonso Beorlegui y Canet (26 January 1888 – 29 September 1936) was a colonel of infantry in the Spanish Army. In the Spanish Civil War, he led the Nationalist forces in the Campaign of Gipuzkoa in August and September 1936.

On 18 July 1936, at the beginning of the Spanish Civil War, in Pamplona, Beorlegui put himself under the orders of General Emilio Mola, who ordered him take control of the Civil Guard and Assault Guards of the city—approximately 2,000 men—and put him in charge of public order in the city. Shortly afterward, Mola ordered Beorlegui to lead an offensive to the Basque province of Gipuzkoa with the regular troops, Civil Guard forces and some newly raised units of requetés.

After the Battle of Irún, they occupied the town on 5 September, closing the French border to the northern provinces of the republic. Beorlegui was wounded in the advance towards the international bridge of Irún, refused to receive suitable treatment, and died a month later. Mola's forces soon went on to secure the whole of the province, isolating the remaining Republican provinces in the north, which led to their fall the next year.

== Bibliography ==
- Thomas, H. (2001). The Spanish Civil War. New York: Modern Library. ISBN 9780375755156.
