= Campaign of Gipuzkoa =

Campaign of the Spanish Civil War, in the province of Gipuzkoa

- Part of the Spanish Civil War
- Campaign in one-week intervals
Date	July 20 – September 26, 1936
Location	Gipuzkoa, Northern Spain
Result	Nationalist victory

Belligerents
(Spain) Spanish Republic	(Francoist Spain) Nationalist Spain

Commanders and leaders
Lt. Col. Augusto Pérez Garmendia (POW) (DOW); Lt. Antonio Ortega	Gen. Emilio Mola; Col. Alfonso Beorlegui Canet (DOW); Lt. Col. José Solchaga; Lt. Col. Rafael García Valiño

Strength
3,000	3,500 men Ju 52 bombers Italian bombers Panzer I tanks 1 battleship 1 cruiser 1 destroyer

Casualties and losses
?	?

The campaign of Gipuzkoa was part of the Spanish Civil War, where the Nationalist Army conquered the northern province of Gipuzkoa, held by the Republic.

== Background ==
In late July Mola's troops suffered a shortage of ammunition (having only 26,000 rounds of ammunition). Then Francisco Franco sent him large supplies of ammunition and weapons from Italy and Germany via Portugal (600,000 rounds). On August 13, Mola met Franco in Seville and decided to capture San Sebastián and Irún in order to cut the Basques off from the French Border at the western end of the Pyrenees.

== The campaign ==
=== Advance on San Sebastian ===
The campaign was initially conceived by General Emilio Mola as an advance to Irún, to cut the northern provinces off from France, and to link up with the Nationalist garrison in San Sebastián that was to have seized that city. The campaign was diverted from the advance on Irún when the direct route to the town was blocked by the demolition of the bridge at Endarlatsa. When word came that the Nationalists in San Sebastián were besieged in the Cuartel de Loyola, Alfonso Beorlegui diverted all his forces westward toward that town in an attempt to relieve the Nationalist garrison. Two other Nationalist columns advanced on the city from points further west with the intent of cutting it off from Biscay. Nevertheless, on 27 July, the Nationalist garrison in San Sebastián surrendered.

=== Advance on Irun ===
Following the failure to relieve the siege of the Nationalists in San Sebastian, the forces of Beorlegui resumed their advance on Irún to cut off the northern provinces of Gipuzkoa, Biscay, Santander and Asturias, from their source of arms and support in France by taking that city. On August 11 the Nationalists took Tolosa and Beorlegi seized Picoqueta, a key ridge commanding the approach to Irún. Telesforo Monzon, a Basque Nationalist, travelled to Barcelona to seek aid, but he only got 1,000 rifles, and the Basque nationalists confiscated the gold in the local branch of the Bank of Spain to buy weapons in France, but on August 8 the French government closed the frontier.

On August 17, the rebel battleship España, the cruiser Almirante Cervera and the destroyer Velasco arrived at San Sebastián and started to shell the city. After that, German Ju 52 bombers and other Italian planes bombarded on a daily basis the bordering towns of Hondarribia and Irun, as well as San Sebastián. Furthermore, the Nationalists captured the republican commander in Gipuzkoa, Pérez Garmendia.

=== Fall of Irun and San Sebastián ===
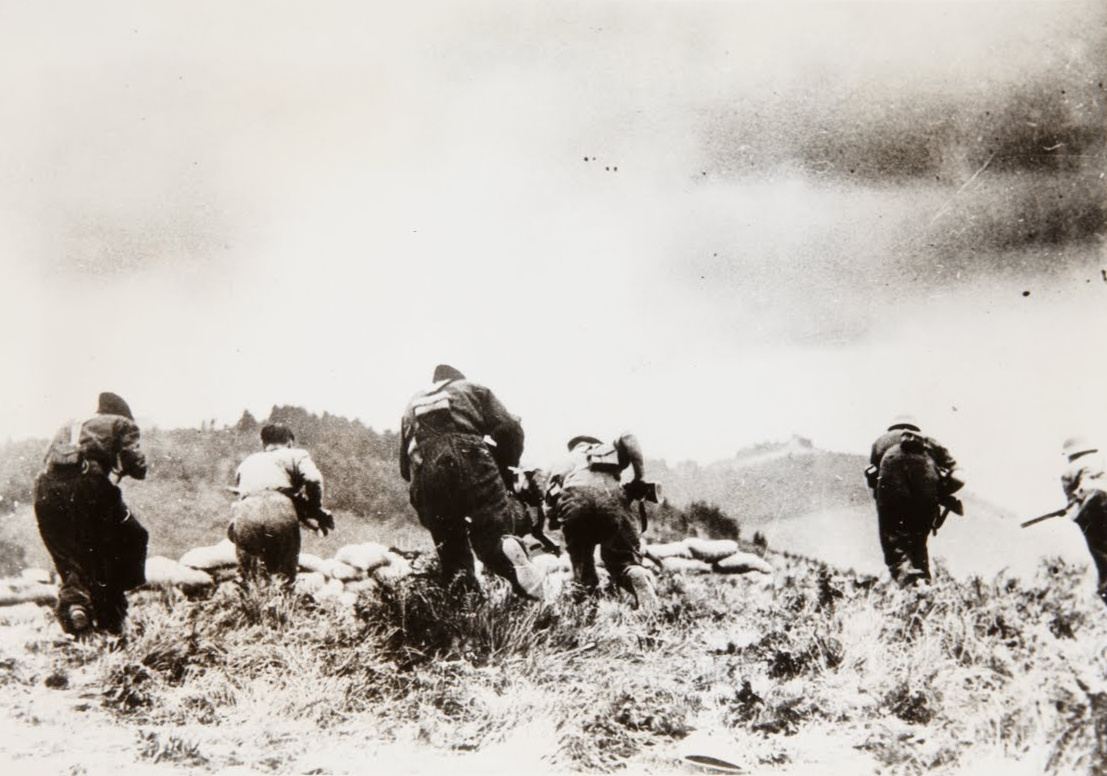
Counterattack of the Republican forces in the surroundings of Irun, before its fall to the Nationalists

On August 26, Beorlegui began the assault on Irún. The poorly armed and untrained leftist and Basque nationalist militias fought bravely but could not fend off the rebel push, in no small part due to an inability to get ammunition to the defending forces. After bloody combats, the resisting forces were overwhelmed on September 3, 1936: thousands of civilians and militia-men fled in panic, some across the French border. The town was occupied by Nationalist forces that day. The victorious Beorlegui was wounded, dying a month later of gangrene, the general having refused treatment for his wounds. Enraged by their lack of ammunition, retreating anarchists burned parts of the city.

The Nationalists followed up the capture of Irun with the capture of San Sebastián, effectively surrounding and isolating the northern Republican zone from external support. The fall of San Sebastián illustrated a fundamental difference in policy as well as strategy between the Basque and Anarchist leadership. Thanks to the Basque leadership, a sizeable number of the city's 80,000 inhabitants fled on an exodus towards Bilbao, in the Spanish province of Biscay. British field-journalist George L. Steer sets the figure of the terrified population fleeing to Bilbao at 30,000. Basque Nationalist Party officials arranged for the final orderly evacuation of the city before its fall, holding back anarchist efforts to repeat the burning of Irun by shooting several anarchist officials. Small in number, the anarchists were planning to wreak havoc.

Despite the evacuation of San Sebastián, hundreds of people were killed in the city as a result of pseudo-trials mounted by the conquering rebel troops in the aftermath of the city's occupation; during the first months of occupation approximately 600 were murdered in paseos (extrajudicial executions). Among them, Steer cites the execution of seventeen priests of Basque nationalist sympathies. The city mayor also faced summary execution.

The Nationalist rebels advanced further west. They were stopped by the Republicans at Buruntza for a few days, but continued their push until the outer fringes of Biscay (Intxorta). There, the resistance of the Basque pro-republican forces, backed up with 8,000 rifles smuggled in extremis by Lezo Urreiztieta to Santander on 24 September, along with the exhaustion of the Nationalists, resulted in an end of the offensive until the War in the North began.

== Aftermath ==
In a few months in late 1936 the Nationalists conquered 1,000 square miles of terrain and many factories. Furthermore, they cut off the Basques from land-links with a sympathetic France. Indalecio Prieto, the Republican minister of defense, sent the Republican fleet to the northern ports in order to prevent a rebel naval blockade. On occupation during September, a Comisión Gestora or Management Commission was appointed by the rebel nationalists comprising the factions involved in the military insurrection, i.e. Carlists, Falangists, and others. The Junta Carlista, the Carlist high executive body in the province, was then chaired during the first months by the local Carlist leader Antonio Arrúe Zarauz up to early 1937.

After taking over San Sebastián, speaking in the Basque language was frowned upon, and then forbidden by proclamation. Occupation was followed by harsh repression against inconvenient figures and individuals. Among them, the Basque clergy were specifically targeted and exposed to torture and rapid execution for their family ties and/or proximity to Basque nationalist proponents and ideas. In general, they were searched according to blacklists put together in Pamplona. Despite occasional internal protests within the ecclesiastic hierarchy, they did not go far. A widespread purge of the clergy in Gipuzkoa was decided in the high military and ecclesiastic circles. The occupiers also purged the Provincial Council (Diputación/Aldundia) resulting in the expulsion of 1,051 civil servants and workers, 123 of them railway operators.

The hatred underlying the crackdown was evidenced by the assassination of José Ariztimuño 'Aitzol', a priest and major personality of the Basque cultural renaissance during the previous years), tortured and shot on 18 October in the Hernani cemetery, along with other ecclesiastic and civilian victims found fleeing.

== See also ==
- List of Spanish Nationalist military equipment of the Spanish Civil War
- List of Spanish Republican military equipment of the Spanish Civil War
- The Basques during wartime

== Bibliography ==
- Aznar, Manuel (1969). Historia Militar de la Guerra de España. 3 vols. Madrid: Editora Nacional.
- Barruso, Pedro (1996). Verano y revolución. La guerra civil en Gipuzkoa (julio-septiembre de 1936), San Sebastián: Haramburu Editor.
- Barruso, Pedro. "Gipuzkoa 1936: Verano y revolución, la Guerra Civil en Gipuzko. (Spanish.)
- Beevor, Antony (2006). The battle for Spain. The Spanish Civil War, 1936-1939. Penguin Books. ISBN 978-0-14-303765-1.
- Jackson, Gabriel (1967). The Spanish Civil War. Princeton University Press. ISBN 978-0-691-00757-1.
- Preston, Paul (2013). The Spanish Holocaust: Inquisition and Extermination in Twentieth-Century Spain. W. W. Norton & Company. ISBN 0393345912.
- Romero, Eladi (2001). Itinerarios de la Guerra Civil española: guía del viajero curioso, Barcelona: Laertes.
- Steer, George (2009). The Tree of Gernika. London, UK: Faber Finds. ISBN 978-0-571-25513-9. Original date, 1938.
- Thomas, Hugh (2001). The Spanish Civil War. Modern Library. ISBN 0-375-75515-2.
