= Walter Patterson =

Walter Patterson may refer to:

- Walter Patterson (governor) (1735 or 1742 – 1798), British colonial governor
- Walter Patterson (American politician), U.S. representative from New York
- Walt Patterson, environmentalist
