= Lycée privé Sainte-Geneviève =

Private high school in Versailles, France

Coordinates: 48°48′13″N 2°09′19″E

Lycée Sainte-Geneviève
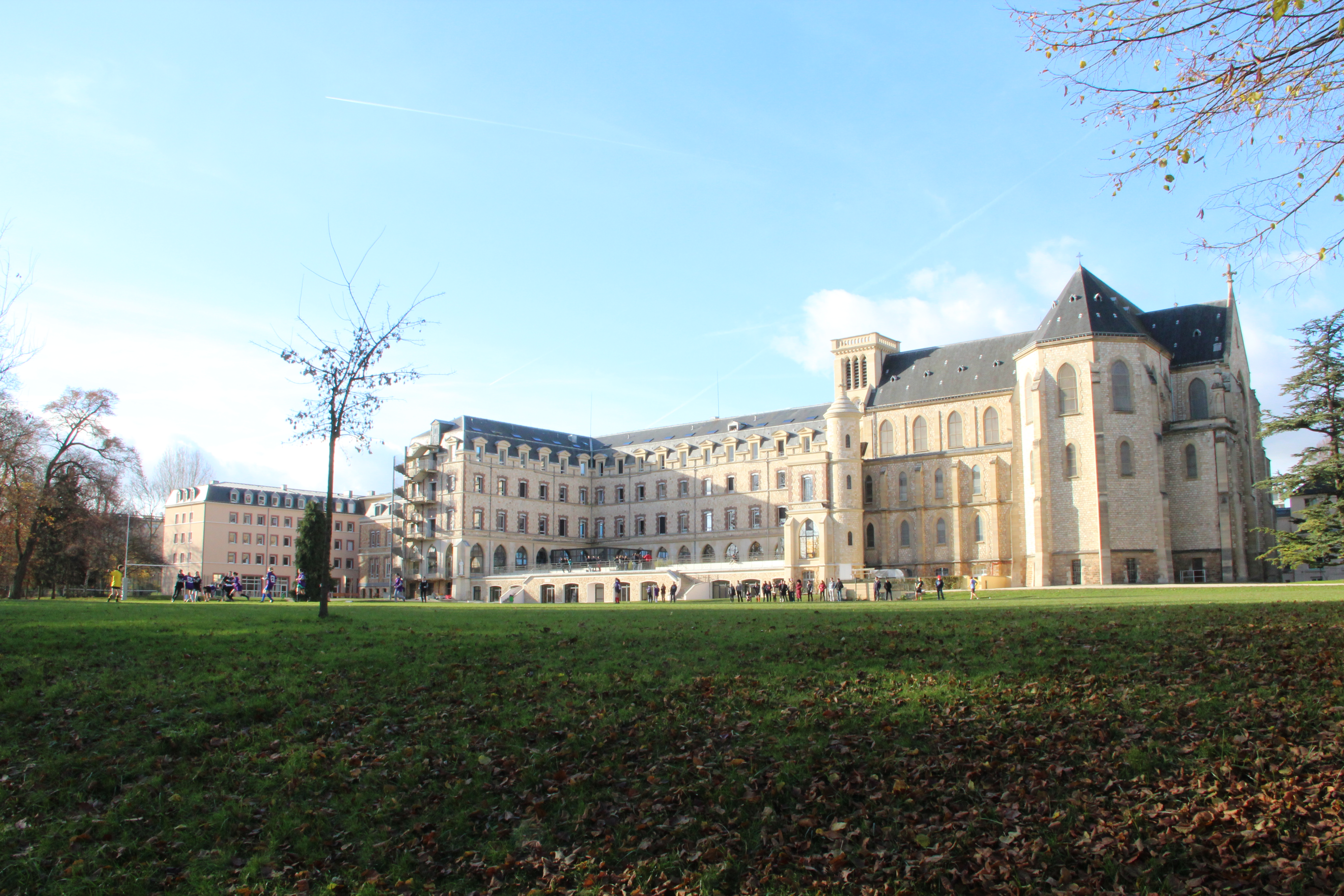
- Motto: Servir (French)
- Motto in English: To Serve
- Type: Private, Catholic
- Established: 1854; 172 years ago
- Affiliations: Jesuit
- Location: Versailles, France
- Website: BGinette.com

Lycée Sainte-Geneviève is a private institution offering preparatory classes for the grandes écoles (France's elite universities).

Founded in 1854 by the Society of Jesus on what is now Rue Lhomond in Paris, it moved to Versailles in 1913 following the decrees expelling religious congregations and the law on the separation of Church and State.

The school, commonly nicknamed "Ginette" or "BJ" (for "boîte à jèzes," slang for "Jesuit box"), is renowned for its students' high success rate in the competitive entrance exams for top engineering and business schools, particularly the École polytechnique, Centrale Paris, ESSEC and HEC.

== Reputation ==
Lycée Sainte-Geneviève has long played a central role in forming the intellectual, scientific, military, and political elite of France. Its preparatory classes (MP, PC, PSI, PT, BCPST, ECG) consistently rank among the top nationwide. In 2025, Ginette's MP, PC, and BCPST tracks ranked first in the country, while its ECG stream led HEC Paris and ESSEC Business School admissions both in terms of volume and success rate.

The school is widely recognized for its rigorous academic standards, its Jesuit values centered on service ("Servir"), and its commitment to developing both intellect and character. Ginette also maintains one of the strongest alumni networks in France, with over 26,000 members supporting former and current students.

In 2016, Nobel Prize laureate in Physics Serge Haroche gave a lecture at Ginette, exemplifying the school's continued ties to the academic and scientific elite.

== Academics ==
Ginette provides PC/PC*, MP/MP*, PT/PT*, PSI*, ECG and BCPST classes.

== Notable alumni ==
=== Military ===
- Hubert Lyautey (1854–1934), Marshal of France
- Jean de Lattre de Tassigny (1889–1952), Marshal of France
- Antoine Béthouart (1889–1982), Compagnon de la Libération
- Henry de Bournazel (1898–1933)
- Honoré d'Estienne d'Orves (1901–1941), Compagnon de la Libération
- Philippe Leclerc de Hauteclocque (1902–1947), Compagnon de la Libération and marshal of France (Marshall Leclerc)
- Pierre Segrétain (1909–1950), commander of the 1st Foreign Parachute Battalion
- Alain de Boissieu (1914–2006), Compagnon de la Libération and Chief of Staff of the French Army
- Tom Morel (1915–1944), Compagnon de la Libération
- Jean-Louis Battet (born 1944), admiral, Chief of Staff of the French Navy from 2001 to 2005
- Édouard Guillaud (born 1953), admiral, Chief of the Defence Staff since 2010

=== CEOs ===
- Étienne Audibert (1888-1954), second CEO of EDF from 1947 to 1949
- Pierre Gadonneix (born 1943), CEO of Gaz de France from 1996 to 2000, then CEO of EDF from 2004 to 2009
- Louis Gallois (born 1944), CEO of SNCF, then CEO of EADS and CEO of Airbus
- Marc Tessier (born 1946), former chairman of France Télévisions
- Jean-Martin Folz (born 1947), former chairman and CEO of PSA Peugeot Citroën
- Philippe Varin (born 1953), CEO of PSA Peugeot Citroën (2009-2014)
- Benoît Potier (born 1957), CEO of Air Liquide
- Édouard Michelin (1963–2006), former CEO of Michelin
- Pierre Simon (1885-1977), first CEO of EDF (1946-1947)
- Tidjane Thiam (born 1962), CEO of Crédit Suisse

=== Politicians ===
- Jean-François Deniau (1928–2007), statesman, diplomat, essayist and novelist; member of the Académie française
- Laurent Touvet (born 1962), conseiller d'État, directeur des libertés publiques et des affaires juridiques au ministère de l'Intérieur
- Valérie Pécresse (born 1967), Minister for Higher Education and Research
- Emmanuelle Mignon (born 1968), civil servant and chief of staff of President Nicolas Sarkozy

=== Scientists ===
- Albert Jacquard (1925–2013), statistician, geneticist
- Xavier Le Pichon (born 1937), geophysicist, professor at Collège de France, member of the Académie des Sciences
- Ivar Ekeland (born 1944), mathematician
- Albert Ducrocq (1921–2001), scientific, journalist and essayist
- Stanislas Dehaene (born 1965), mathematician and cognitivist, professor at Collège de France, member of the Académie des Sciences
- Elyès Jouini (born 1965), economist, member of the Institut universitaire de France

=== Others ===
- Tirso de Olazábal, Count of Arbelaiz (1842-1921), politician
- Pierre Savorgnan de Brazza (1852–1905), explorer
- Saint Charles de Foucauld (1858–1916), explorer and Catholic religious
- Yves du Manoir (1904–1928), rugby player
- Jean Bastien-Thiry (1927–1963), attempted to assassinate French President Charles de Gaulle
- Bernard Fresson (1931–2002), cinema actor
- Philippe Sollers (born 1936), writer
- Patrick Peugeot (born 1937), president of the Cimade
- Bernard Ramanantsoa (born 1948), dean of HEC Paris from 1996 to 2015
- Bernard de Montmorillon (born 1950), dean of Paris Dauphine University from 1999 to 2007
- Mac Lesggy (born 1962), scientific journalist
- Julien Coupat (born 1974), political activist

== See also ==
- List of Jesuit sites
