= Pierre Simon (1885–1977) =

- Born: 1885; Provence
- Died: 1977 (aged 91–92)
- Education: École polytechnique
- Occupations: Businessman, French resistance
- Known for: First président-directeur général of Électricité de France (1946–1947)

Pierre Simon (1885–1977) was the first président-directeur général (PDG) of Électricité de France (EDF) and a member of the French Resistance. Simon was a student of the Christian school in Mées and then at the l'Institution Sainte-Geneviève in Versailles. He was a civil engineer at Gap, Chief of Staff to the Minister of Public Works in 1924, Chief Engineer of Forces hydrauliques – dams in Grenoble in 1925, and some years later, he became head of the Department of Roads and Bridges in Isère. At the end of 1936, Simon was called to the Direction des Forces Hydrauliques et des Distributions d'Énergie électrique – Directory of Dams and Electricity at the Ministry of Public Works. He was an essential part of the des 3 milliards – 3 million plan to rehabilitate the country's electric grid, which began in 1938, and in negotiations with the Fédération de l'Éclairage – Lighting Federation which improved the staffing situation.

In June 1940, Vichy France reorganized the Ministries. An Electric Directory was created, attached to the Ministry of Industrial Production. In October, Simon was dismissed and reassigned to the Conseil général des ponts et chaussées. He then entered the private sector, taking over operations for Durand, l'Entreprise Industrielle.

During the war, he was a resistor and kept in touch with Marcel Paul and the Fédération illégale de l'Éclairage – Illegal Lighting Federation. During liberation, Simon participated in some of the meetings for the commission that nationalized electricity, the CNR. After a vote, he accepted the proposal from Marcel Paul to become the first PDG of EDF.

At the beginning of 1947, Robert Lacoste asks Simon to take measures against staff. The government majority wanted to impose a pricing policy on EDF-GDF. On 2 May, Simon resigned. He returned to Durand and was considered Honorary Chair by the end of his life.

== Bibliography ==
- René Gaudy (1978). Et la lumière fut nationalisée : naissance d'EDF-GDF. Paris: Éditions sociales. ISBN 978-2-209-05297-4.
