= John McGregor Hill =

British nuclear physicist

Sir John McGregor Hill, FRS, FREng (21 February 1921 – 14 January 2008) was a British nuclear physicist who was chairman of the UK Atomic Energy Authority for 14 years.

He was born in Chester and educated at the Richmond County Grammar School, Surrey (1930–1939) and at King's College London, where he gained a B.Sc. in Physics. He then served in the Royal Air Force Radar Branch during the Second World War (1941–1945) after which he carried out research into the life span of short-lived radio nuclei at the Cavendish Laboratory, Cambridge and was awarded a Ph.D. In 1948 he was appointed Lecturer in physics in the University of London.

In 1950 he joined the Department of Atomic Energy of the Ministry of Supply at the Windscale plant in Cumbria to follow a career in nuclear energy. He worked on commissioning Britain's first production nuclear reactors, the Windscale Piles, designed to produce plutonium for military purposes. When the emphasis changed to the production of nuclear power he became manager of the Production Group relocated at Risley, Cheshire, overseeing the uranium diffusion plan at Capenhurst in Cheshire, the fuel manufacturing plant at Springfields near Preston, the reprocessing plant at Windscale and the power-generating reactors at Calder Hall in Cumbria and Chapelcross, near Annan.

In 1964 he was appointed to the main board of the UK Atomic Energy Authority, rising rapidly to succeed the first chairman, Lord Penney, in 1967, a post he held until 1981. In 1971, he also became Chairman of British Nuclear Fuels Ltd (BNFL) (formerly the Production Group of UKAEA), and in 1975 succeeded Sir Charles Cunningham as Chairman of The Radiochemical Centre Ltd (later Amersham International plc). He retired as Chairman of BNFL in 1983 and Amersham International plc in 1988.

Hill was knighted in the 1969 Birthday Honours. He was awarded the Melchett Medal by the Energy Institute in 1975, elected a Fellow of the Royal Society in 1981 and a Fellow of the Royal Academy of Engineering in 1982.

He married Nora Hellett in 1947; they had two sons and a daughter. Hill died in Richmond, Surrey in 2008.
