= Melchett Medal =

British medal for science of energy

The Melchett Award is an honour awarded by the Energy Institute for outstanding contributions to the science of fuel and energy.

It was created by and named for Alfred Moritz Mond, 1st Baron Melchett, the 20th century businessman and philanthropist.

== Winners ==
- 1930: Kurt Rummell
- 1931: W. A. Bone
- 1932: Charles M. Schwab
- 1933: John Cadman
- 1934: Friedrich Bergius
- 1935: Harry R. Ricardo
- 1936: Franz Fischer
- 1937: Morris W. Travers
- 1938: R.V. Wheeler
- 1939: H.A. Humphrey
- 1940: Étienne Audibert
- 1941: Clarence A. Seyler
- 1942: Arno C. Fieldner
- 1943: E S Grumel
- 1944: J.G. King
- 1945: C H Lander
- 1946: Sir James Chadwick
- 1947: Kenneth Gordon
- 1949: Sir Frank Whittle
- 1950: R.J. Sarjan
- 1951: F.H. Garner
- 1952: D.T.A. Townend
- 1953: H. Hartley
- 1954: H.H. Storch
- 1955: A. Parker
- 1956: Sir Alfred Egerton
- 1957: Sir Christopher Hinton
- 1959: P.O. Rosin
- 1960: H.C. Hottel
- 1961: Sir Harold Hartley (award to MacFarlane): MacFarlane Memorial Lecture
- 1962: H.E. Crossley
- 1963: HRH Prince Philip, Duke of Edinburgh
- 1964: Homi Jehangir Bhabha
- 1965: F.J. Dent
- 1966: Sir Owen Saunders
- 1967: Sir Charles Cawley
- 1968: A. Ignatieff
- 1969: William T. Reid
- 1970: T E Allibone
- 1971: Lord Rothschild
- 1972: F T Bacon
- 1974: Sir Frederick Warner
- 1975: Sir John Hill, UKAEA
- 1976: T G Callcott
- 1977: J H Chesters
- 1978: G. Brunner
- 1979: A.W. Pearce
- 1980: Sir William Hawthorne
- 1981: J.H. Dunster
- 1982: J.A. Gray
- 1985: J.M. Beer
- 1986: N. Franklin
- 1987: Sir George Porter
- 1988: Frank Fitzgerald
- 1989: Neville Chamberlain
- 1990: David Lindley
- 1991: R.N. Hodge
- 1992: H.L. Beckers
- 1993: Robert Evans
- 1994: S. William Gouse, Jnr
- 1995: John Chesshire
- 1996: Sir Crispin Tickell
- 1997: I. Boustead
- 1998: Brenda Boardman
- 1999: Ian Fells
- 2000: Walt Patterson
- 2001: Lord Browne of Madingley
- 2002: Mary Archer
- 2003: Sir John Parker
- 2004: Sir Roy Gardner
- 2005: Vincent de Rivaz
- 2008: Andrew Warren
- 2010: James Skea
- 2011: Allan Jones
- 2013: David MacKay
- 2014: Lord Oxburgh
- 2016: David King
- 2017: Fatih Birol

== See also ==
- List of chemistry awards
