= Tirso de Olazábal =

Spanish noble and Carlist politician (1842–1921)

The Most Excellent The Count of Arbelaiz
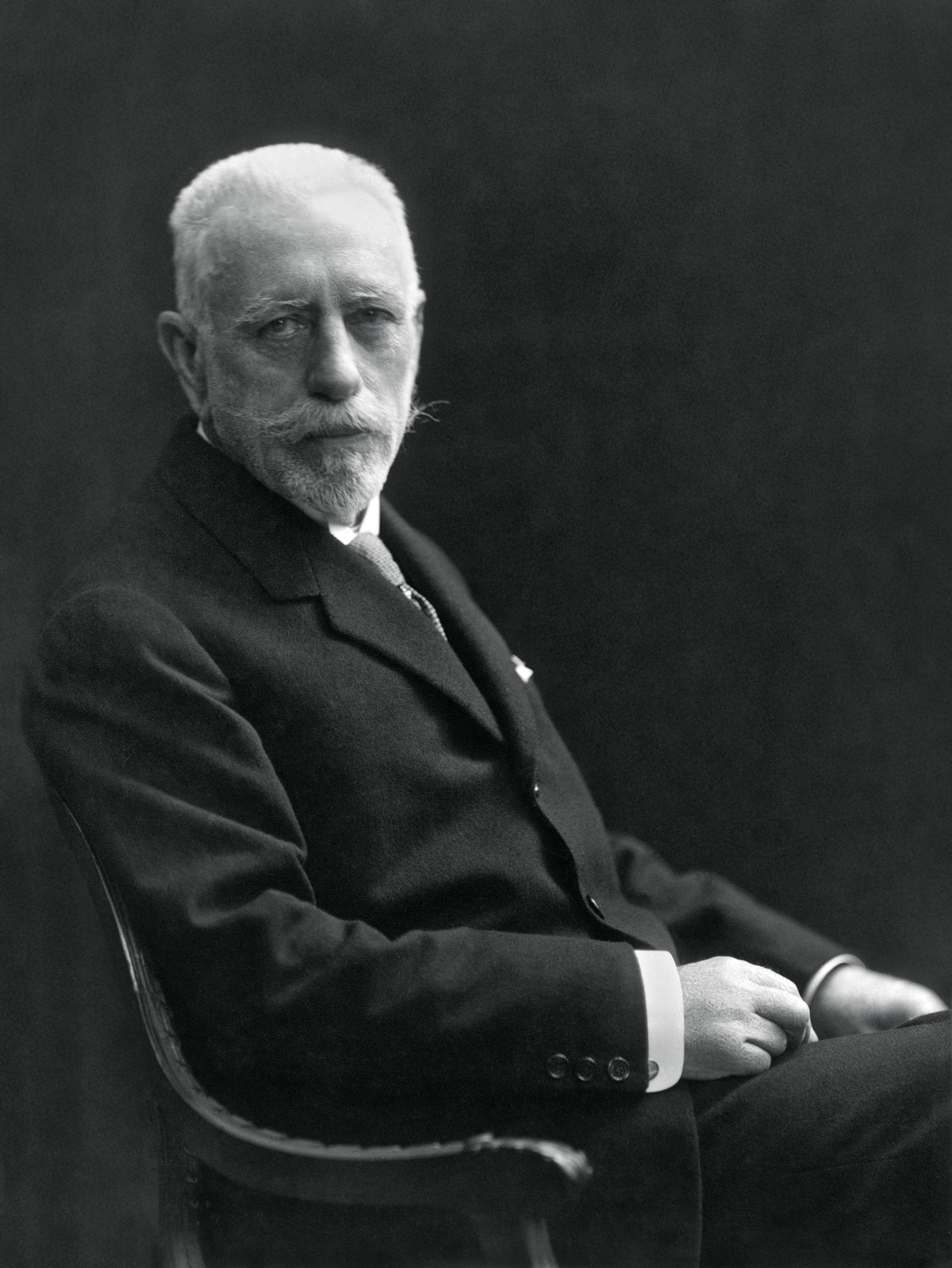
- Formal photo portrait, 1921

Personal details
- Born: 28 January 1842 Arbelaiz Palace, Irun, Spain
- Died: 25 November 1921 (aged 79) San Sebastián, Spain
- Occupation: Politician

Tirso de Olazábal y Lardizábal, 1st Count of Arbelaiz, 1st Count of Oria (28 January 1842 – 25 November 1921), was a Spanish noble and Carlist politician.

== Family and early life ==
=== Origins ===
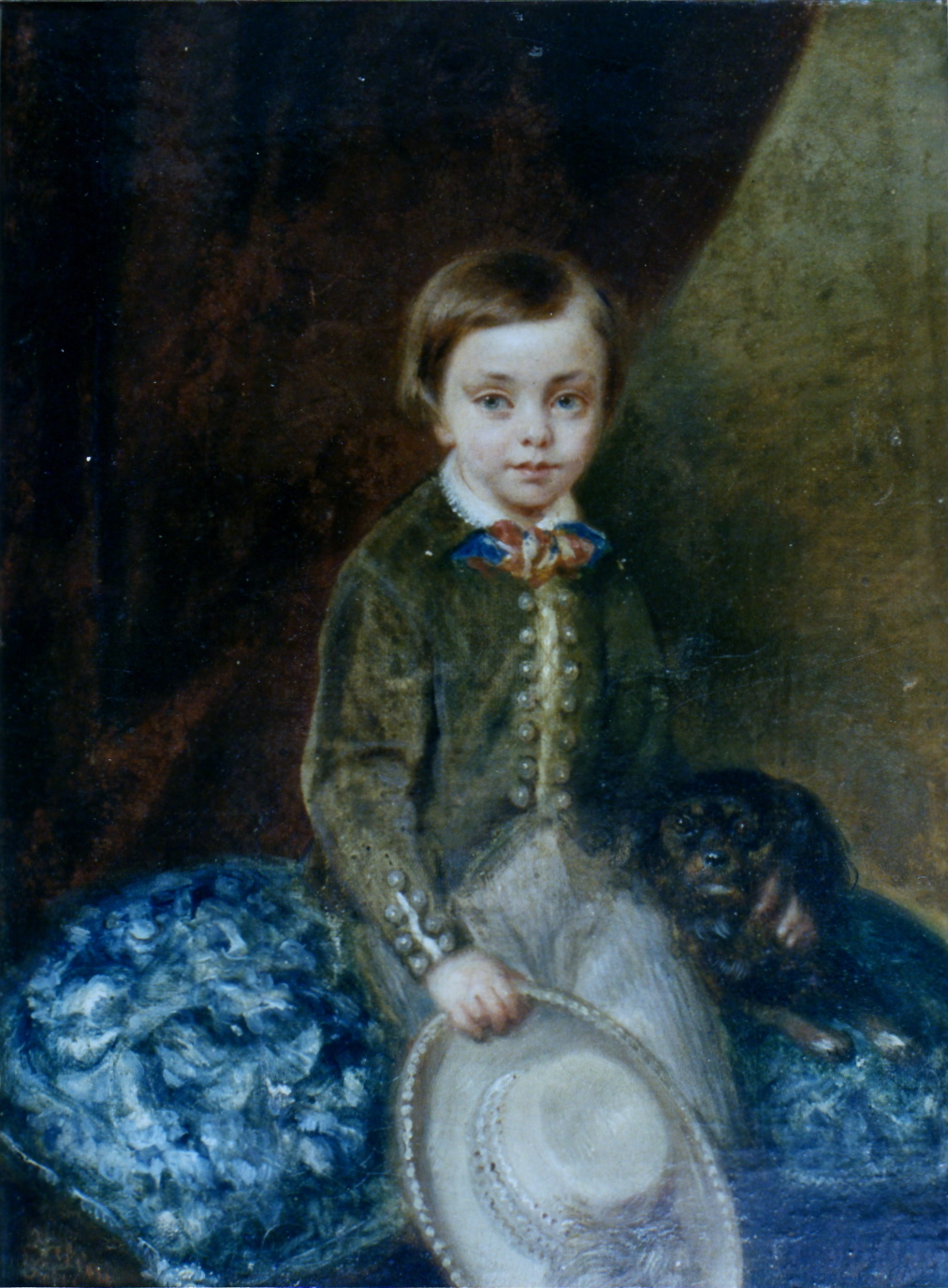
Tirso as a child

Tirso Julián Francisco José Ramón María de Olazábal y Lardizábal was born into a distinguished and aristocratic Basque family, with many of its members recorded in history of the region. The Olazábal family is reputed to be one of the first settlers of the province of Guipúzcoa, taking part in the exploits of Cantabria. They also contributed to the restoration of Spain with Pelagius of Asturias and accompanied Ferdinand the Saint in the Siege of Seville and in several incursions into Andalusia. Considered to be a chief lineage or a lineage of "Elder Relatives" (Parientes Mayores) of Guipúzcoa, its founders owned the fief of Alzo, where they possessed the patronat of San Salvador Church. The first official document of the province of Guipúzcoa, dated 1025, attributes to the Olazábal family the property of 300 caseríos (villages) in the place of Alzo.

Tirso's ancestors can safely be traced back to the 14th century. More recently, his great-grandfather, Domingo José de Olazábal y Aranzate, was alcalde of Irun in 1767 and 1778. His son and Tirso's grandfather, José Joaquín Cecilio María de Olazábal y Murguía (1763–1804), served in the navy and is listed as teniente de fragata. His oldest son and Tirso's father, José Joaquín María Robustiano de Olazábal y Olaso (1794–1865), between 1828 and 1845 was many times elected to the Guipuzcoan Diputación. He is better known as a cartographer, which suggests that he was also a military, serving either in the army or in the navy. In 1836 together with Francisco de Palacios he published a map of Guipúzcoa, re-worked later in another version, issued in 1849.

Tirso's mother was María Lorenza de Lardizábal y Otazu (1806–1889); his maternal grandfather, Juan Antonio de Lardizábal y Altuna, XII Lord ("Señor") of Laurgain and VII Lord ("Señor") of Amézqueta, was among the largest landowners in Guipúzcoa. As head of the Lardizábal family, he inherited the palace of the same name located in Segura and owned other provincial estates. His maternal grandmother, María Benita Ruiz de Otazu y Valencegui, also belonged to distinguished families of the Basque aristocracy. Among her ancestors are the Idiáquez of Azcoitia (later Dukes of Granada de Ega), the Counts of Peñaflorida and the Marquesses of Rocaverde. One of Tirso's maternal great-great-grandfathers, Manuel Ignacio de Altuna y Portu (1722–1762), was a major figure of Enlightenment in Spain. Encyclopedist and scholar, Altuna became known for his friendship with Jean-Jacques Rousseau (who mentions him in his Confessions, calling him the "virtuous Altuna"), to whom he was introduced in Venice during his Grand Tour in the 1740s. Along with the Count of Peñaflorida and the Marquis of Narros, he founded the Royal Basque Society of Friends of the Country (known as La Bascongada) in Bergara, in 1748. The three men came to be known as the "Gentlemen of Azkoitia" (Los Caballeritos de Azcoitia) or the "Triumvirate of Azkoitia" (Triunvirato de Azcoitia).

=== Early years ===
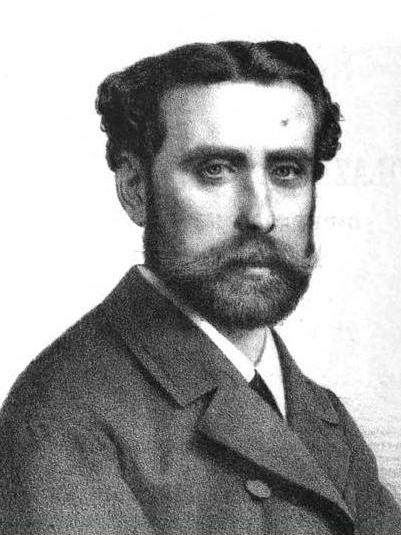
Young Olazábal

The young Tirso was first educated in the prestigious Jesuit college of de la Sauve near Bordeaux, where he is reported to have pursued philosophy. He completed his curriculum studying mathematics at the Lycée privé Sainte-Geneviève in Paris; no further details are known. From his youth he developed keen interest in music, his favourite composer having been Mozart; in the early 1860s he set up 18 local bands across Guipúzcoa, allegedly gathering musicians from all social strata. In 1864 he won a gold medal on the Franco-Spanish art exhibition in Bayonne, directing an orchestra he created in Irun; he also kept directing local orchestral bands during various provincial feasts in the mid-1860s.

With the death of his father in 1865, Tirso inherited part of his considerable wealth. Among other properties located in Guipúzcoa (spread over Azpeitia, Beasain, Beizama, Idiazabal and Lazcano), his legacy included the Arbelaiz Palace and its formidable private garden, in Irun, which had remained in the hands of his family since the reign of Philip II of Spain. This ancestral estate, which hosted various historical figures (Henry III of France, Catherine de' Medici, Charles IV of Lorraine, Catherine of Braganza, Philip V of Spain and Charles X of France, etc.) and owes its name to the powerful family who built it in the sixteenth century, passed by marriage to the Olazábal family after the wedding of Tirso's great-grandmother, the Dowager Marchioness of Valdespina, Maria Teresa de Murguía y Arbelaiz, XV Lady (Señora) of Murguía and VI Lady (Señora) of Arbelaiz, with the above-mentioned Domingo José de Olazábal y Aranzate, in 1756. From his father, he also inherited the assets of the majorat (mayorazgo) of Abaria, founded in the seventeenth century by Francisco de Abaria, of whom Olazábal descended through his paternal grandmother, María Brígida de Olaso y Abaria. This majorat (mayorazgo) included, primarily, the Abaria Palace, in Villafranca de Oria, which during the Third Carlist War, and on the occasion of the Carlist Meeting that were held there, would provide accommodation to Carlos VII.

=== Marriage and family ===
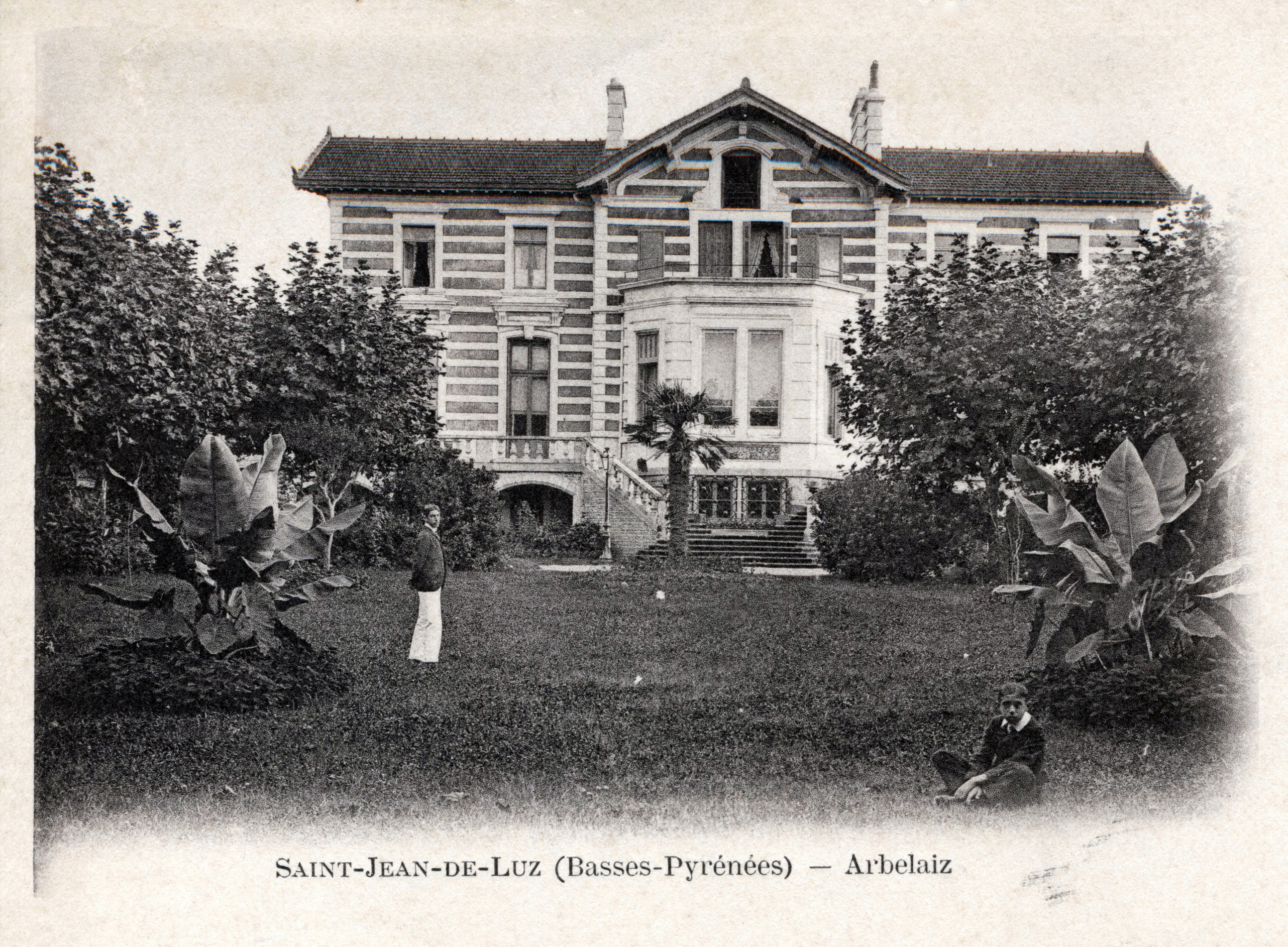
sons in the gardens at Villa Arbelaiz

In 1867 he married Ramona Álvarez de Eulate y Moreda (1846–1927), also from a noble lineage related mostly to Guipúzcoa and Navarre. Ramona descended in the male line from Juan Álvarez de Eulate y Ladrón de Cegama, Governor of New Mexico between 1618 and 162 and later Castellan of Pamplona. Her father (like her grandfather), Rafael María Álvarez de Eulate y Acedo, was a military man; some sources describe him as infantry captain and some claim he was a navy lieutenant. He owned the Mirafuentes landholding and partially estates of Yturbe, Inurrigarro, Monasteriobide and Jaúregui, located in south-western Navarre and eastern Álava.

Tirso and Ramona had 11 children; the eldest son, Ramón, married Maria Luísa de Mendóça Rolim de Moura Barreto, related to the Portuguese royal family as Infanta Ana de Jesus Maria of Portugal's granddaughter and John VI of Portugal's great-granddaughter. They settled in Portugal, scarcely involved in Spanish affairs; two of the younger ones, Tirso and especially Rafael, were active in the Carlist movement until the 1950s.

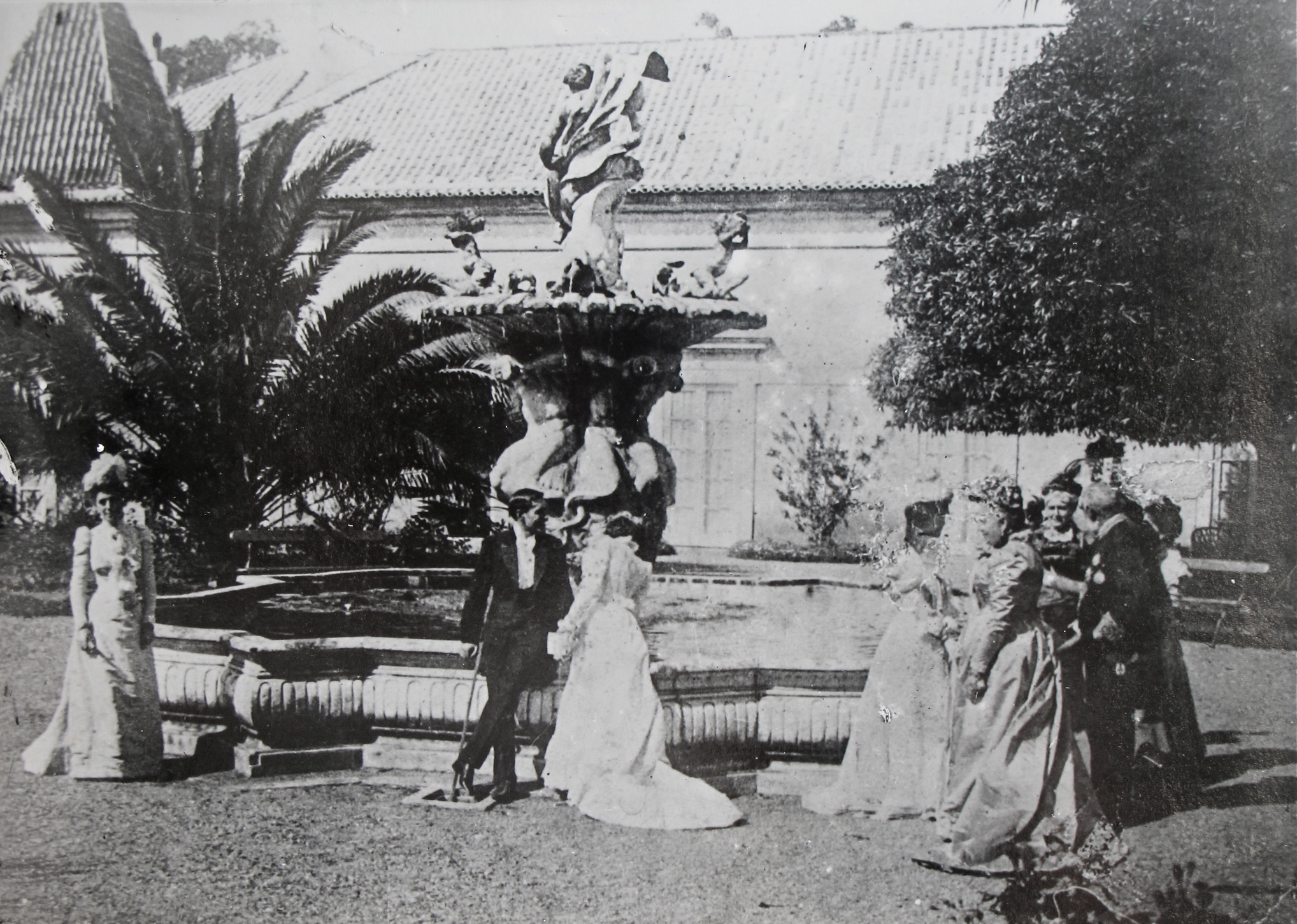
at wedding of his eldest son, 1899

In March 1934, Rafael, alongside Carlist monarchist Antonio Lizarza and Alfonsine monarchists Antonio Goicoechea and Emilio Barrera, met the Italian dictator Benito Mussolini and Italo Balbo, in Rome, in order to negotiate on a military agreement that would guarantee Italian support of their movements should a civil war erupt in Spain. Since 1930s advocating a dynastical rapprochement with the Alfonsinos, in 1957 Rafael declared Don Juan the legitimate Carlist claimant. Their sister, Vicenta de Olazábal y Álvarez de Eulate, married Julio de Urquijo e Ibarra, a well known Carlist and especially Basque activist. Many of the Tirso's offspring made their names in different areas in Spain, Portugal or worldwide; his distant relative Pedro de Morenés y Álvarez de Eulate in 2015 served as the Spanish Minister of Defense. Condado de Arbeiaiz is functional until today.

== Early career ==
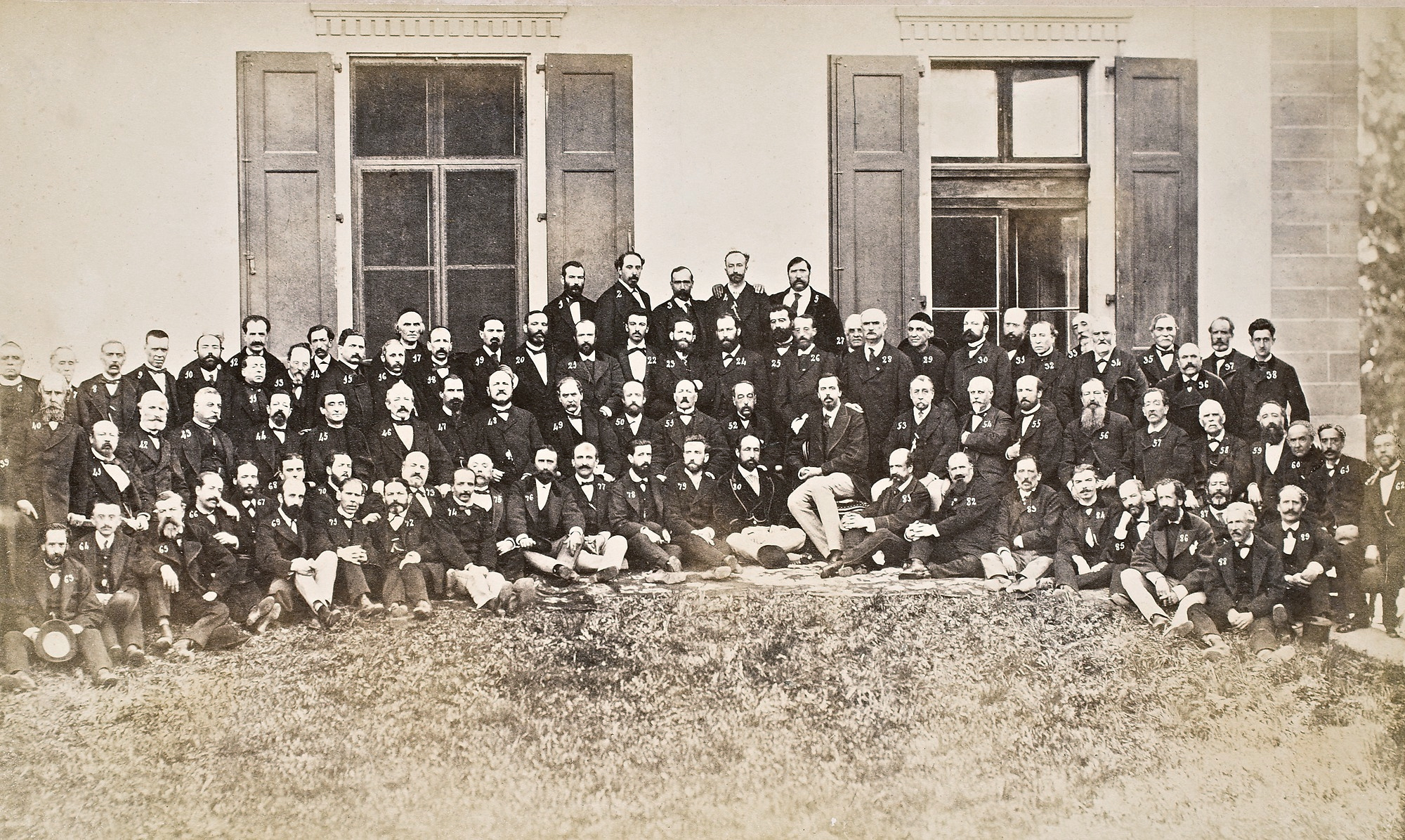
Olazábal at Junta de Vevey

Olazábal's political beginnings are not clear. None of the sources consulted offers any information on political preferences of his father or paternal grandfather; his maternal grandfather was a die-hard conservative. Hence, it is not known what political mechanisms were at work when in Villafranca in 1865 Tirso Olazábal was elected to the Guipuzcoan provincial Diputación as representative of segundo partido judicial. Given his very young age and total lack of experience, his mandate might have been political tribute to his late father. Already as member of the Guipuzcoan Diputación he took part in homage welcoming Isabel II in Tolosa en route to her usual San Sebastián summer residence; when offered the order of Isabella the Catholic he allegedly declined it as an undeserved honor. His term lasted only one year, as in 1866 he was already listed as ex-diputado.

In 1867 Olazábal ran for the Cortes and was elected from the San Sebastián district; in the chamber he became one of the youngest deputies. Present day author counts him among 17 neocatólicos, contemporary press considered him a governmental candidate, an 1869 informative publication claimed he ran as independent, and an 1888 hagiographical Carlist publication hailed him as the youngest member of the Carlist minority, the thesis repeated also by some scholars. In 1868 Olazábal again welcomed Isabel II during what soon turned out to be her last summer journey to the beaches of Biscay; he painfully acknowledged her deposition in course of the Glorious Revolution later that year. During the 1869 elections to Cortes Constituyentes he joined the list of “candidaturas católicas” with “Dios y fueros” as their local Guipuzcoan war cry; he was elected from the same district. Little is recorded of his parliamentarian activity, except that he opposed opening casinos in San Sebastián.

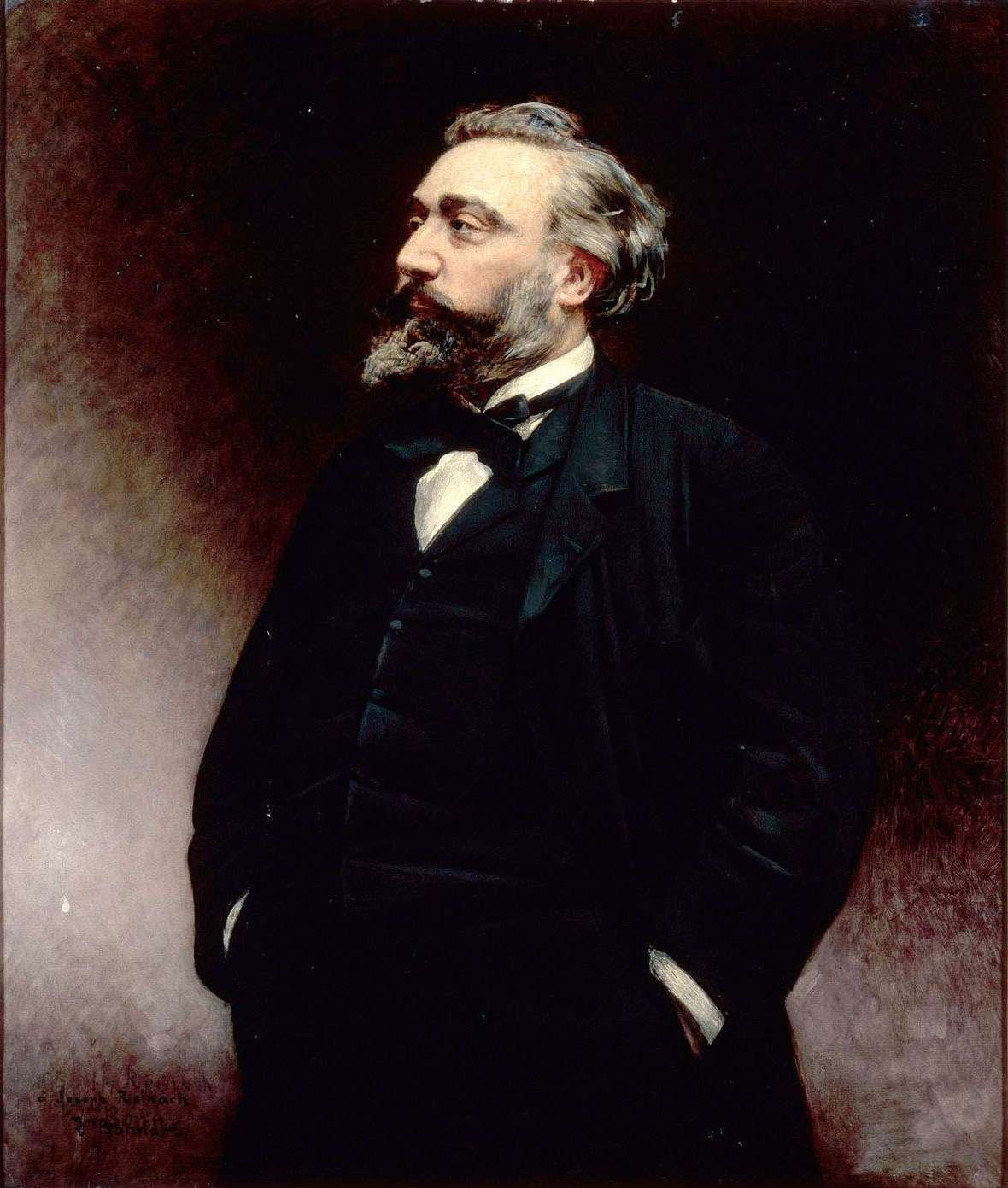
Léon Gambetta

Some time late 1869 or early 1870 Olazábal got engaged in the Carlist conspiracy, though it is not clear whether he neared the movement together with many neocatólicos or whether he had always sympathised with the legitimists. He left Spain in search of arms for planned insurgency and with the party finances entrusted, he patrolled France looking for an appropriate deal. Early 1870 he purchased some 20,000 rifles in Antwerp and arranged the shipment by sea.

Since himself he joined the grand Carlist meeting known as Junta de Vevey and was unable to supervise the entire action, due to misunderstanding the cargo was not unloaded in Bilbao. Olazábal followed the ship to Genoa, where he managed to deceive Italian police and got part of the cargo reloaded to another ship, this time successfully sent to Catalonia. The subsequent installment was intercepted by the French, who feared a Prussian plot aiming at arming native tribes in French Africa. Olazábal travelled to Tours, where he talked to Gambetta and got the transport released. At this time his activities were already known to the Madrid government and there was legal action launched against him.

== Civil war ==
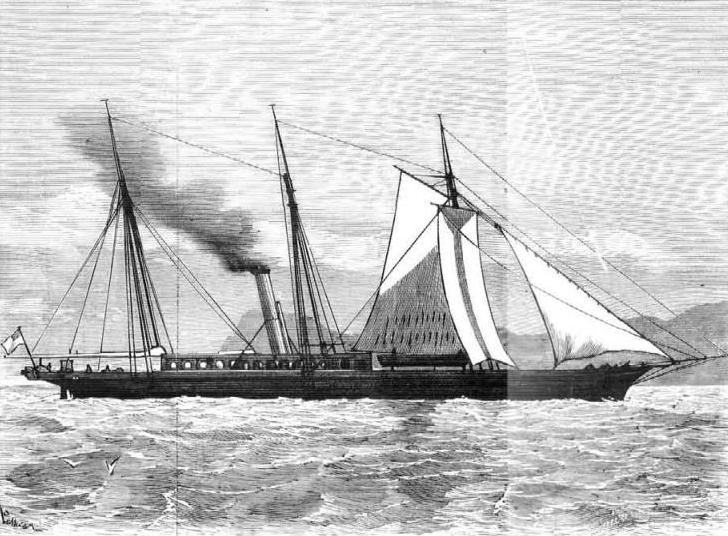
Deerhound

At the outbreak of hostilities Olazábal was in Switzerland, nominated gentilhombre of the claimant's wife Doña Margarita; his task was to prevent her expulsion from the country, demanded by the Spanish government. Another of his diplomatic missions was acting as a link to Ramón Cabrera. Finally, nominated head of Comisión de armamento, he became sort of the Carlist minister of supply.

Early 1873 Olazábal bought in Versailles 11,000 berdan rifles and 2m cartridges, now useless for France. Soon afterwards he arranged two ships to get the arms transported to Spain, but his plot envisioned initial shipment to England to deceive the French. Off the English coast the cargo was reloaded and during the night of July 13, 1873 the first installment reached the Ispaster beach; it was secretly unloaded by Carlist conspirators. The same maneuver was repeated two weeks later in a daring action, this time Cap Higuer serving as point of delivery. As following another shipment of August 13 the Carlist ship Deerhound was intercepted by the Liberal schooner Buenaventura, Olazábal arranged for another ship, Orpheon, which broke the Liberal blockade and delivered arms to Lequeitio, on the coastline now firmly controlled by the Carlists. Two more missions, this time somewhat chaotic, were completed in October and November before Orpheon sunk due to a naval accident.

Engineering a wide fund-raising scheme and arranging a new delivery from France to England, Olazábal was outsmarted by the Madrid agents who illegally seized the cargo in Newport. He promptly filed a lawsuit; eager to avoid a diplomatic conflict with the British, the Liberal embassy in London agreed to pay Olazábal a compensation fee, which by far exceeded the original cost incurred. In 1874 he bought a French ship, renamed it as London, and co-ordinated delivery of artillery pieces to Bermeo. Later on that year he planned to deliver arms to Catalonia, but that mission was made pointless as the Carlists withdrew from the Mediterranean cost. London kept delivering arms in successive missions, with the last shipment in January 1876. In the meantime Olazábal arranged for 34 artillery pieces to be manufactured in France and transported by land to the Carlist-controlled border in Irun, before he was finally expulsed from France as urgently demanded by the Madrid government.

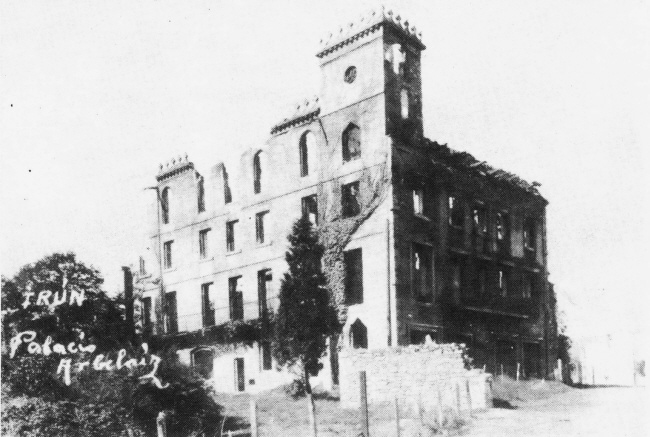
Palacio de Arbelaiz

In recognition of his merits the Carlist artillery corps asked Carlos VII to nominate Olazábal honorary colonel; contemporary scholar claims he delivered more than 50% of all artillery pieces used by the Carlist troops. Exact scale of his engagement is unclear; some authors maintain that Carlists transported arms also from America with English intelligence reporting a wide international delivery network. The claimant acknowledged his role by conferring upon Olazábal condado de Arbeláiz. His engagement in actual combat was rather symbolic. He is remembered for his stance during the siege of Irun, when Olazábal directed artillery fire from the guns he procured at his family palace at Plaza de San Juan (San Juan Square), held by the Liberal troops.

== Idle years ==
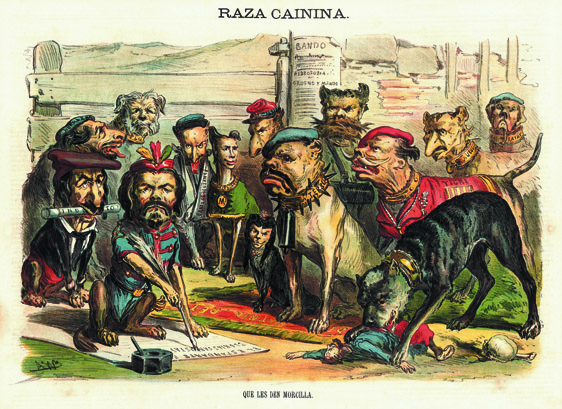
Carlist dogs conspiring

Following the Carlist defeat Olazábal's return to Spain was unthinkable, though governmental reprisal measures did not affect him very much; in the late 1870s he was the first taxpayer of Irun. He settled in Saint-Jean-de-Luz in the French province of Labourd, only 8 km from the Spanish border, where he acquired several properties. By the 1890s, he purchased a residential estate that would be known as "Villa Arbelaiz". According to Sûreté, which kept monitoring his activities, Olazábal joined a committee co-ordinating Carlist activities in France. He was allegedly entrusted with new military purchases in England and in fact he kept trafficking arms across the border. In late 1876 Ejército del Norte, the occupation army in Vasco-Navarrese provinces, was put on alert as the news of Carlist war preparations mounted, especially that in 1877 Carlos VII issued a manifesto pledging to defend the fueros, scrapped by the central government. At that time Olazábal was already referred to by the Madrid press as “famous Tirso de Olazábal”

As resumption of hostilities turned out to be nothing but rumors and Carlism was reduced to licking its wounds, Olazábal withdrew to privacy. Almost nothing is known about his public efforts in the early 1880s, his activities having been major financial contribution to Zumalacarregui monument, planned to be erected in Guipúzcoa, press celebrations of pro-Carlist bishop of Plasencia or congratulation letters to El Siglo Futuro on 10th anniversary of its launch. In the mid-1880s he started to supply the newspaper with brief informative notes from Saint-Jean-de-Luz. Though most of the above steps suggest he was on good terms with the Nocedalista faction, none of the studies discussing growing conflict within Carlism lists Olazábal as involved in increasingly bitter rivalry between immovilistas and aperturistas.

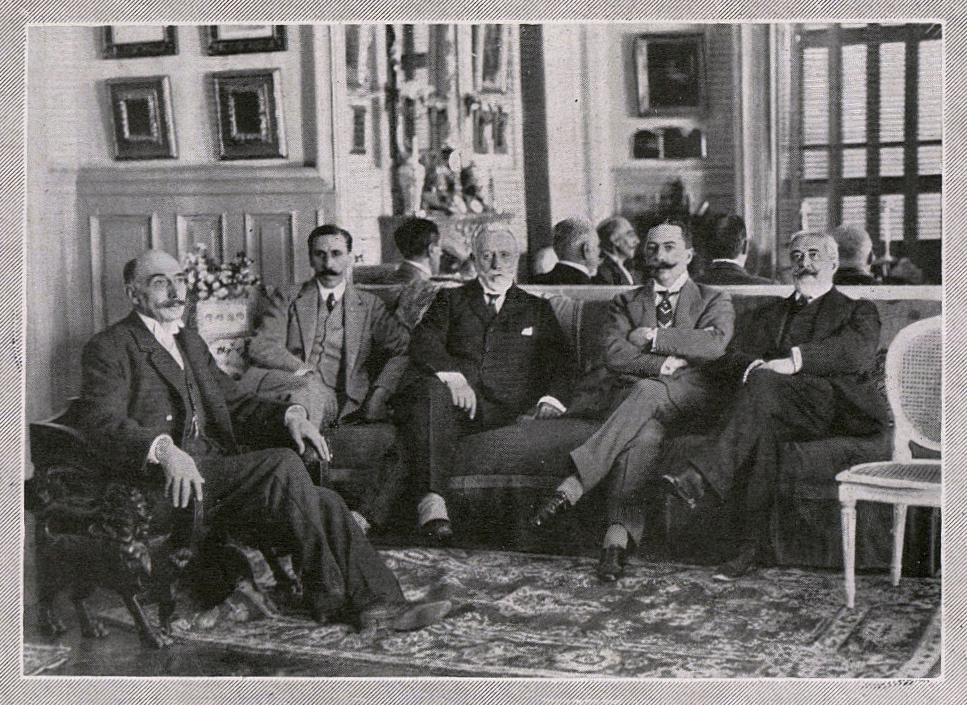
Olazábal with his king and Carlist leaders in Saint-Jean-de-Luz, ca 1910

In early 1887 the provincial Guipuzcoan Carlist jefe conde del Valle resigned; the claimant appointed Olazábal as his successor, a choice far from obvious since the incumbent resided out of Spain; at that time he was only paying brief visits to the province. He immediately clashed with the Vascongadas jefe and his cousin, marqués de Valde-Espina, protesting appointments of non-local sub-delegates and claiming they should have been elected by local juntas. This minor clash was dwarfed by the Integrist secession in 1888; though earlier associated with Neo-Catholics, forming the core of the rebels, Olazábal stayed loyal to Carlos VII and emerged one of key politicians of the shattered Carlism. He did not prevent, however, all Guipuzcoan Carlist periodicals defecting to the Integirst camp, with the provincial El Fuerista leading the way. In 1889 Olazábal was invited to Frohsdorf to take part in wedding of claimant's daughter, Blanca de Borbón; also the Liberal press kept considering him one of the most insatiable and dangerous exiles, his Saint-Jean-de-Luz residence turned into a Carlist émigré headquarters. He seemed to have been on good terms with the new Jefe Delegado, marqués de Cerralbo. However, during periods of Valde-Espina's infirmity, it was Salvador de Elió and not Olazábal nominated his temporary replacement for the entire Vascongadas.

== Election years ==
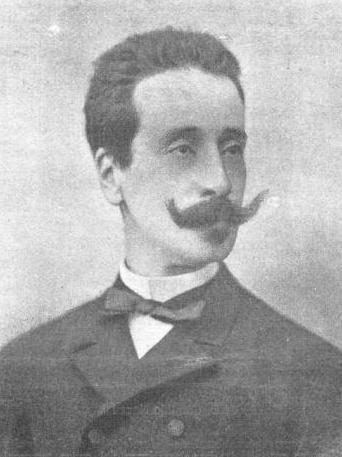
Ramón Nocedal

Under de Cerralbo's leadership Carlism rejected intransigence; the 1891 election campaign to the Cortes was the first one that the movement officially decided to join. Olazábal opposed the plan, though not because he sided with the immovilistas; he rather seemed anxious that Carlism might deliver an embarrassingly poor showing. He was overruled and entrusted with a prestigious task: in the Guipuzcoan Azpeitia district he was to defeat Ramón Nocedal, leader of the Integrist rebels. Carlos VII was frantic to see Nocedal humiliated and remarked that in case of defeat, the name of Azpeitia would be recorded next to Vergara, Oroquieta and Valcarlos. The Carlist propaganda machinery was put in motion with banquets attended by Carlist leaders, the press declaring Azpeitia “indudable triunfo” and Olazábal hailed as guardian of the Vascongadas’ honor. Nocedal's victory was acknowledged as a disaster. Olazábal blamed the hierarchy and the Jesuits, who allegedly favored the Integros; the theme reverberated in private correspondence until the late 1890s.

The revenge time came 2 years later, though prior to the next campaign in 1893 local Integrists suggested forming a united Guipuzcoan front. Olazábal, apparently not much concerned with ideological differences, was inclined to accept the proposal, but he could not swallow the condition that Azpeitia would be left for them to grab the mandate. Eventually he confronted Nocedal again and lost again, though initially the Carlist press congratulated him on victory, the difference was mere 17 votes, and it was only following backstage haggling involving the government that in 1894 Olazábal was finally confirmed as defeated.

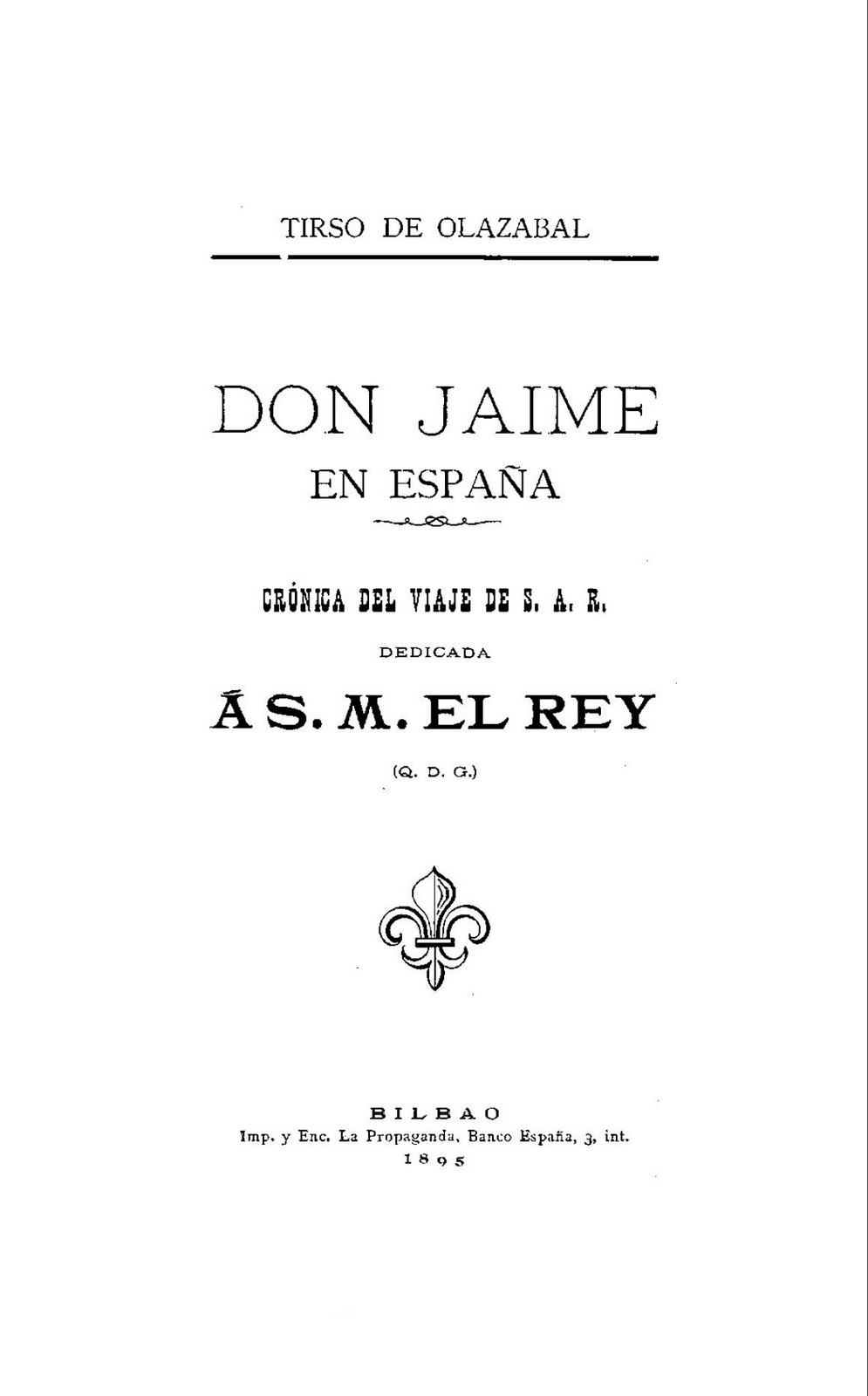
Don Jaime en España: crónica del viaje de S.A.R.

Though Olazábal's prestige with the claimant diminished, it was still at its height. When in 1894 Don Jaime, the 24-year-old son of the claimant, was agreed to pay his first visit to Spain, it was Olazábal appointed his tutor and cicerone. The trip lasted 37 days and covered a route from San Sebastián to Vitória, Burgos, Santander, Covadonga, Oviedo, León, Madrid, Aranjuez, Toledo, Córdoba, Jerez, Málaga, Sevilla, Granada, Jaen, Valencia, Barcelona and Montserrat. The event turned into a media scoop, discussed for months, accompanied by anecdotes and with Olazábal becoming sort of a celebrity. In 1895 he published a booklet with a hagiographical account of the trip. Though the press was speculating about differences between Olazábal and his king, he felt fit to explain to the journalists the meanders of dynastical policy of the claimant.

Recovering from sickness, interviewed in Saint-Jean-de-Luz he declared prior to the 1896 elections that his only aspiration was to get back to health; he soon changed the tone when claimed that in Azpeitia the Jesuits have finally recognised the authority of Carlos VII. Though indeed Nocedal was defeated, it was at the hands of another Carlist candidate; Olazábal joined the race to the Senate and was elected from Guipúzcoa. He would have formed a 4-person minority had he agreed to take oath of loyalty to Alfonso XIII; his electoral triumph turned into a pure prestigious gain, acknowledged in the media.

== La Octubrada ==
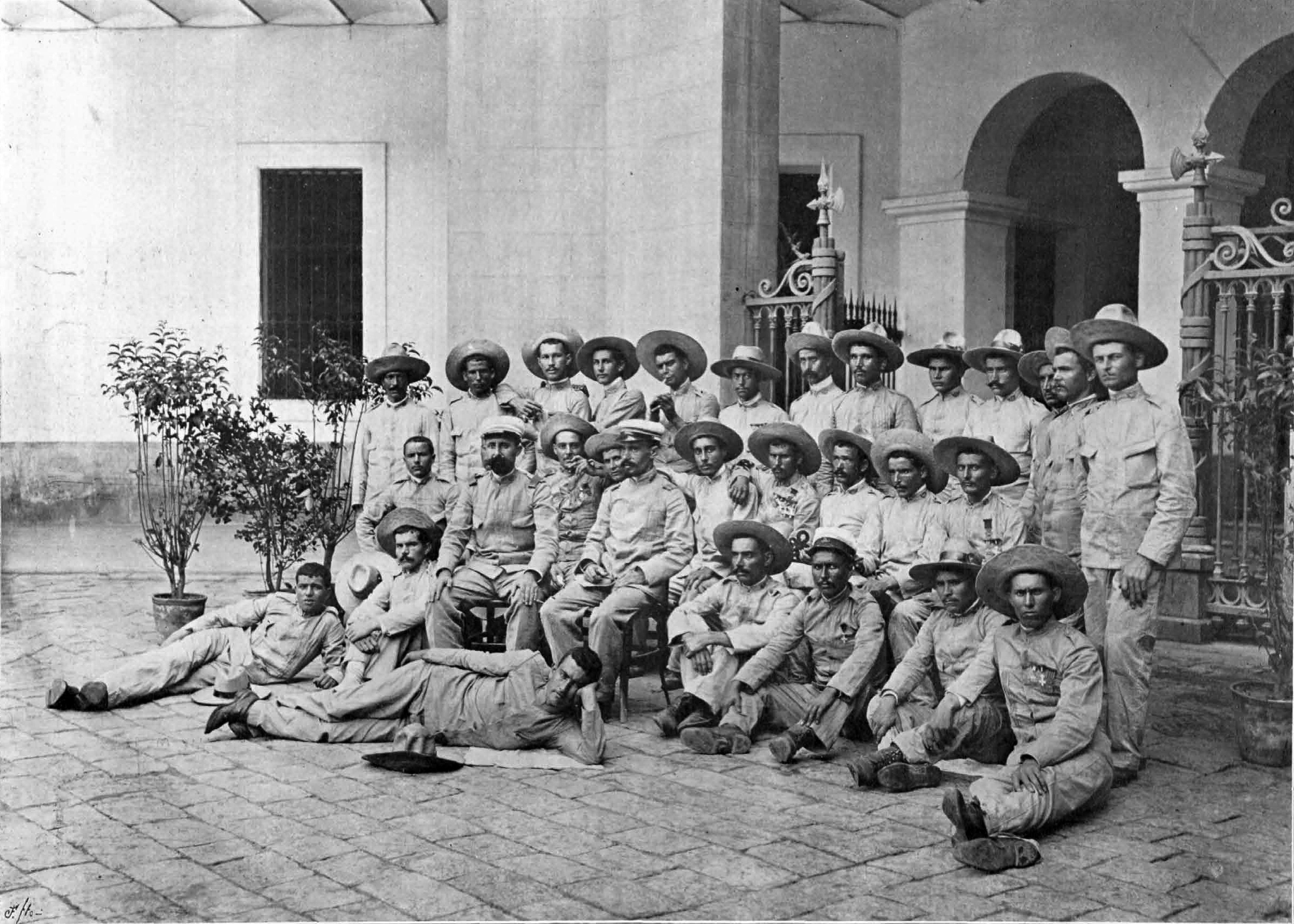
Los Últimos de Filipinas

In September 1896 Olazábal travelled to Madrid and signed Manifiesto de las minorías carlistas. The declaration followed Carlist withdrawal from the parliament and was preconfiguration of the 1897 program, conceived by the movements’ leaders gathered in Venice and known as Acta de Loredán. Both declared non-belligerency but considered the Restoration system unacceptable and included mild pro-social tones.

Already the 1896 manifesto made references to problems overseas; since the conflict evolved into war with the United States, Olazábal declared that Carlists planned no trouble and their priority remained integrity of Spain. However, the government kept a close watch on him, and in July 1898 his Saint-Jean-de-Luz residence was again reported as Carlist operations centre; despite his continuous denials, wild rumors related to Carlist war preparations started to circulate. At that point Olazábal was already engaged in fund-raising campaign, with the same sources as 30 years earlier; Carlist leaders suggested he should control all party funds and co-ordinate all party foreign activities.

Though early 1899 Olazábal declared there was no reason to postpone the wedding of his daughter, he was already busy trafficking arms. He bought 53,000 Gras rifles, arranging later for their industrial recalibration to fit the Spanish cartridge standard. He delivered a portion across the Pyrenees with his own network of smugglers, though it is not clear whether arms were directed to Vascongadas or to Catalonia. There were also plans to use Cap Higuer as a marine disembarkation point. In midst of his hectic activities Olazábal engaged in planning Guipuzcoan electoral alliances of 1899, though it is unclear whether he engineered them or simply approved them ex-post. When de Cerralbo was rumored to resign, the press speculated it would be Olazábal replacing him.

As Sûreté reported arms purchases in London, Brussels, Paris and Switzerland, early 1900 Olazábal delivered 300 rifles from Bayonne across the Pyrenees before the French government bowed to pressure from Madrid and in February ordered him to settle North of the Loire. Olazábal moved to Paris but appealed; the Spanish embassy demanded rejection, though eventually they concluded he would be better watched in Saint-Jean-de-Luz. In October the embassy changed their mind and demanded Olazábal's internment. Though the French indeed interned other Carlist conspirators, the Minister of Foreign Affairs Delcassé considered such action against a longtime legal inhabitant too violent. As the Spanish government feared diplomatic conflict in wake of the Deroulede affair, they backtracked.

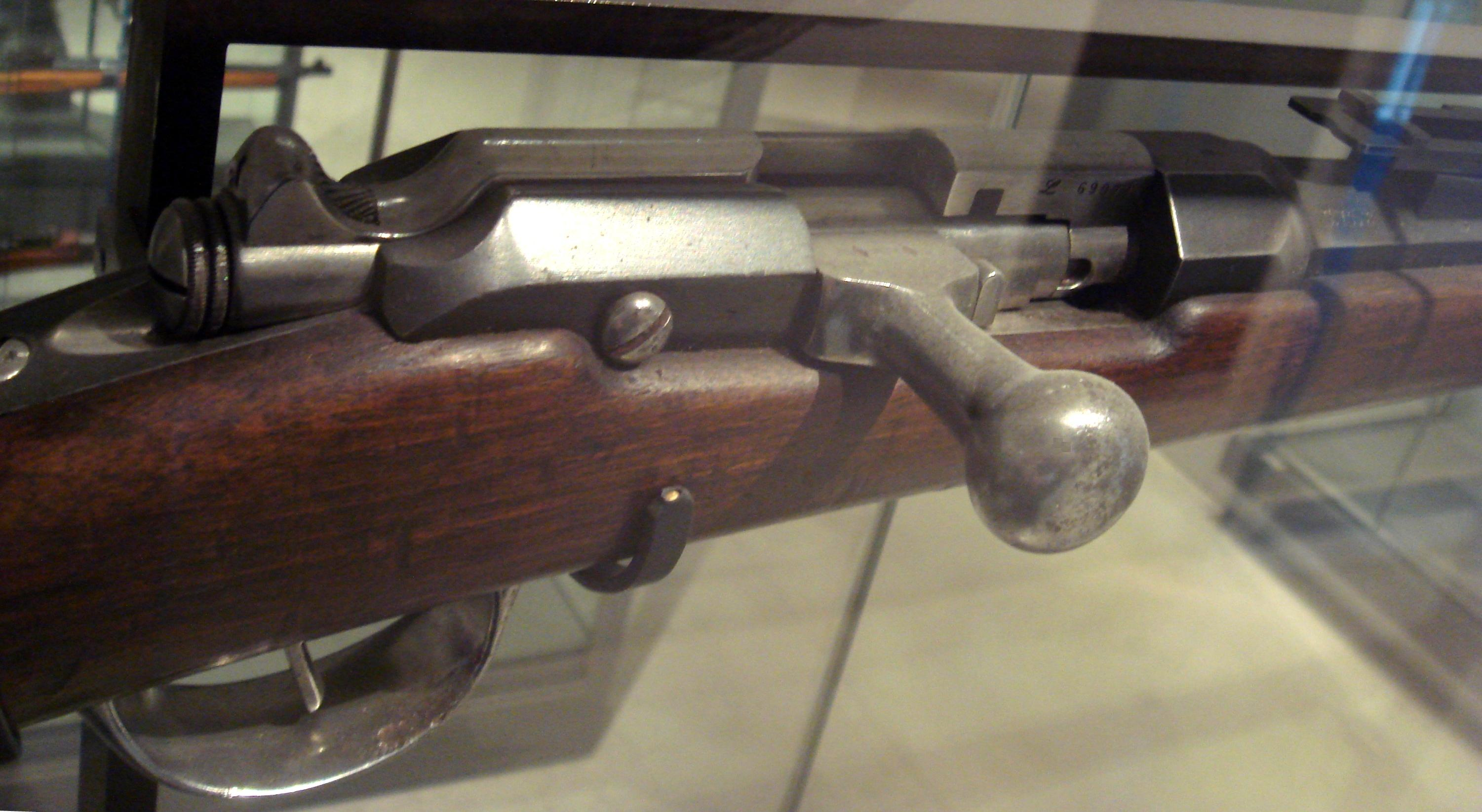
Gras rifle breech

When a series of minor Carlist insurrections rocked Catalonia in October 1900, Olazábal together with many Carlist bigwigs stayed in Paris and declared himself utterly surprised. Whether he was indeed remains unclear; though he contributed to military buildup and harbored political hopes related to potentially rebellious Spanish generals, scholars tend to assume that the rebels acted on their own and with no official order, if not clearly against it. Some partisan versions claimed that the affair was aimed at causing Madrid stock exchange perturbations.

== Early 1900s (The king is dead, long live the king) ==
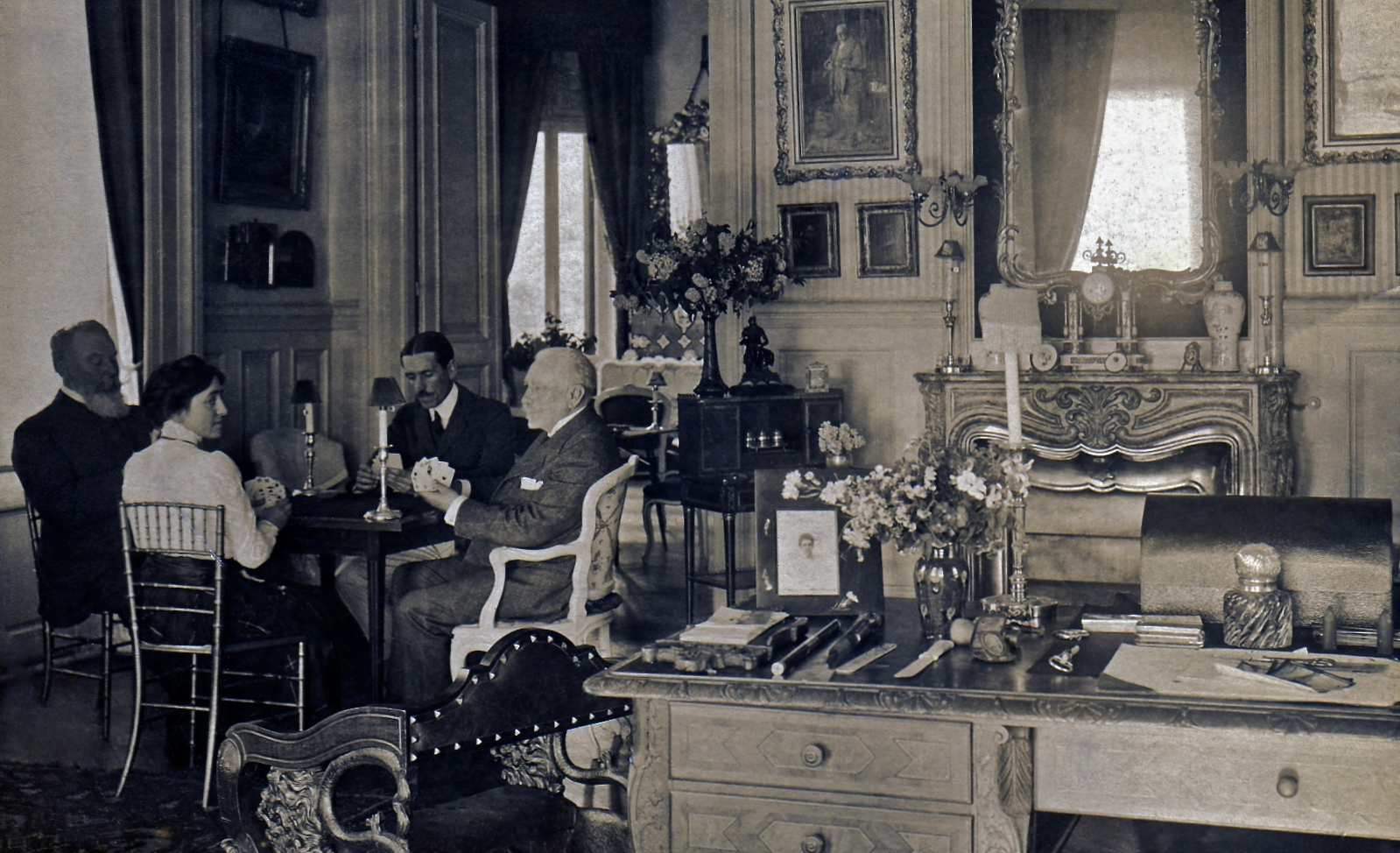
Olazábal family playing cards at Villa Arbelaiz, 1910s

The early 1900s are marked by relative Olazábal's inactivity; he is noted only for occasional Saint-Jean-de-Luz conferences with other Carlist leaders. In pieces published by Spanish press envoys he was presented, "surrounded by his family", as sort of a local tourist attraction. By this time, Villa Arbelaiz became a social center of Saint-Jean-de-Luz welcoming close friends and relatives of the Olazábal family and notable personalities associated with legitimist movements. Among its regular visitors were Don Jaime de Borbón, the former Queen Natalie of Serbia, the Countess of Bardi, Princes and Princesses of Bourbon-Parma, Italian aristocrats, the Duchess of Cadaval, the Counts O'Byrne of Corville and several Carlist politicians.

During these years, Tirso and his family maintained their close relations with Carlos VII's family and were frequent visitors to the Palazzo Loredan in Venice. At least in 1905 he ventured to enter Spain, again accompanying Don Jaime during his visit to Covadonga. Also later he kept feeding the press with news about royal whereabouts, but during the 1907 trip it was already his son Rafael accompanying Don Jaime. It seems that his sons have already started to assume some of his tasks and it is indeed difficult to tell which Olazábal is referred to in various press notes from that period. Tirso is known to have exchanged vast correspondence with other Carlist leaders and upon death of the then Jefe Delegado Matías Barrio in 1909 he was invariably reported by the press as one of his potential successors; though the job went to Bartolomé Feliu instead.

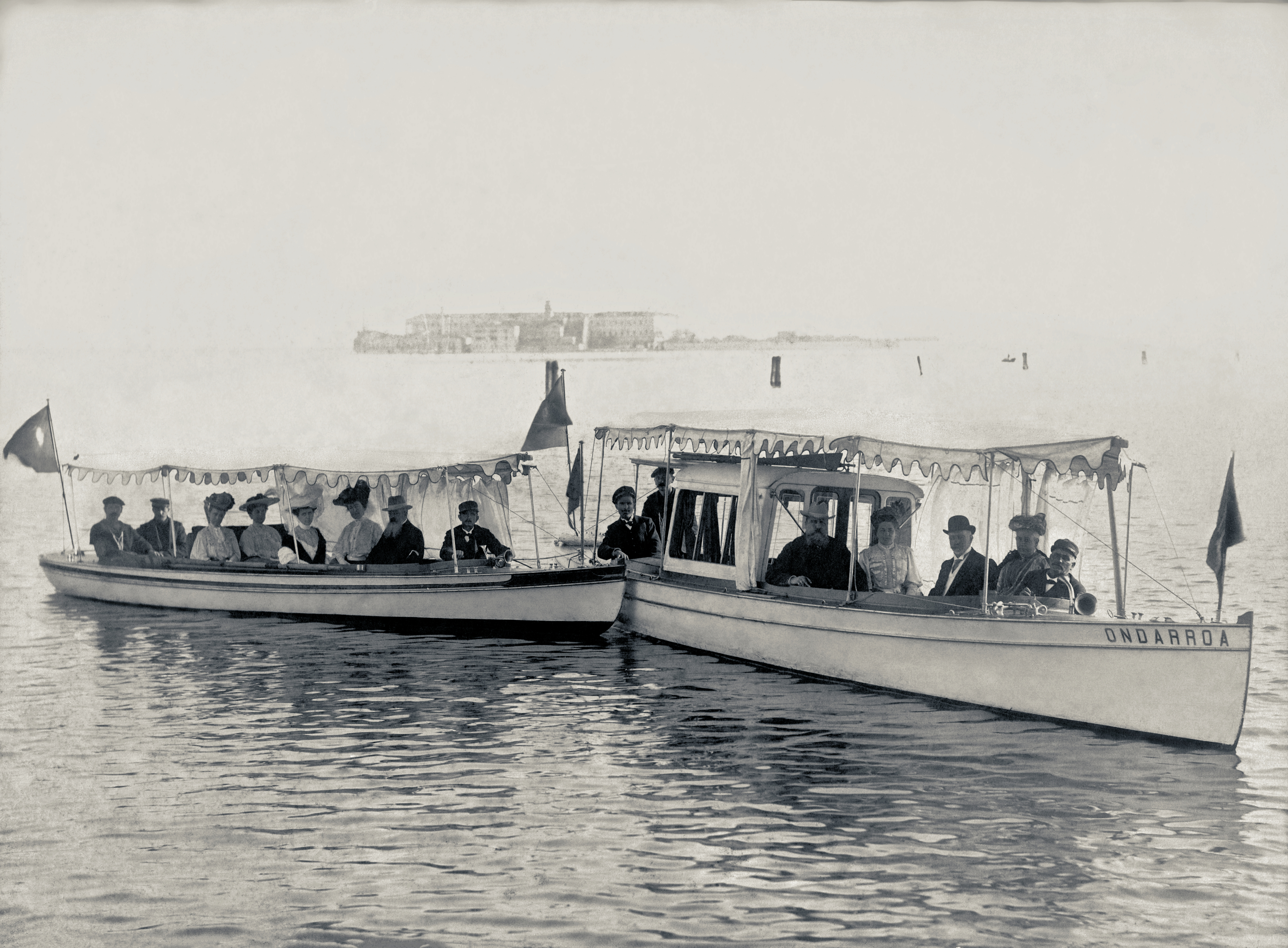
Olazábal couple visiting their king in Venice, 1904

Olazábal was among major Carlist figures at the funeral of Carlos VII in Varese in July 1909; when republican unrest rocked Catalonia later that year, he resumed his now customary arms trafficking role serving the new claimant, Jaime III. The French security claimed that the Carlists were involved in massive contraband, controlled by a team located in Saint-Jean-de-Luz. The French prime minister Briand estimated that 5–6,000 rifles were smuggled through Cerdanya only between December 1909 and February 1910. Contemporary scholars suspect that arms, including artillery pieces, originated mostly from England, with smaller amounts coming from Belgium, France and Austro-Hungary. Disguised as farming hardware, railway equipment, agricultural machines or even pianos, having passed carabineros and guardias civiles on the Spanish side they were stored in Zumárraga, Alsasua and Tudela. Madrid demanded that the French tightly control Olazábal and his son-in-law, Julio de Urquijo e Ibarra. As Paris was upset with Olazábal's public criticism of the republican secular education system, in October 1910 he was again ordered to move North of the Loire; his duties were taken over by Urquijo, permitted to stay in the South. It was only in May 1911 that he was allowed to come back to Labourd, though some sources claim he was expulsed from France in 1912. At that time another Carlist unrest, if indeed considered at any time, was nothing but a long gone illusion.

== Final years ==
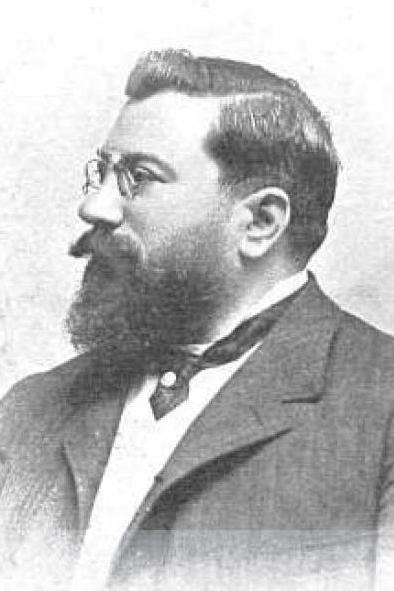
Juan Vazquez de Mella

In wake of the Ley del Candado crisis of 1910 Olazábal together with Fernando Manzanos became the Carlist representative in Comité Ejecutivo of a nationwide Catholic alliance. Locally he joined not the Guipuzcoan, but the Biscay Junta de Defensa Católica; one source claims he intended to run or actually ran for Senate from Biscay in 1910, the information not confirmed elsewhere.

At that time Juan Vázquez de Mella was clearly emerging as the top Carlist personality, engineering a scheme which would depose the then Jefe Delegado, Bartolomé Feliu, and replace him with de Mella's friend, the aging marqués de Cerralbo. Though Olazábal was not in the front row of the plotters, he sided with them and in 1911 wrote a letter to Jaime III, suggesting that de Cerralbo is nominated the new political leader. In 1912 the claimant partially bowed to the pressure by creating an auxiliary collective junta, theoretically set to assist Feliu in his duties; within its structures, Olazábal was confirmed as jefe of the entire Vascongadas and La Rioja, a move up the party structures from the previous provincial Guipuzcoan leadership. In early 1913, with Feliu removed already and under de Cerralbo's lead, there were 10 commissions formed within Junta Central Superior; Olazábal was nominated member of the electoral one. His career at this job did not last long; in July 1913 he resigned all posts within Carlism and announced his withdrawal from politics.

Carlist standard

There is scarce information on Olazábal's public activity in the very last years of his life; indeed it is not clear whether he retired due to his age or due to political differences. Within Carlism he was still celebrated as a prestigious figure, though in 1917 he was reported as taking part in a local initiative clearly associated with Alfonso XIII and especially his wife Victoria. Perhaps the sharpest political turn of his life came in 1919; when the long-developing conflict between de Mella and Jaime III escalated into secession of the so-called Mellistas, Olazábal supported the rebels. Having been a political retiree with no official duties, his gesture presented the secessionists with only a symbolic, prestigious gain. One source definitely claims he joined de Mella, another is less bold and suggests some ambiguity, though with preference for the rebels. Though mechanism behind the Mellist secession is rather well known in general, none of the sources consulted offers any comment as to why, following almost 50 years of loyal service, Olazábal decided to abandon his king.

== Guipuzcoan jefe: legacy ==
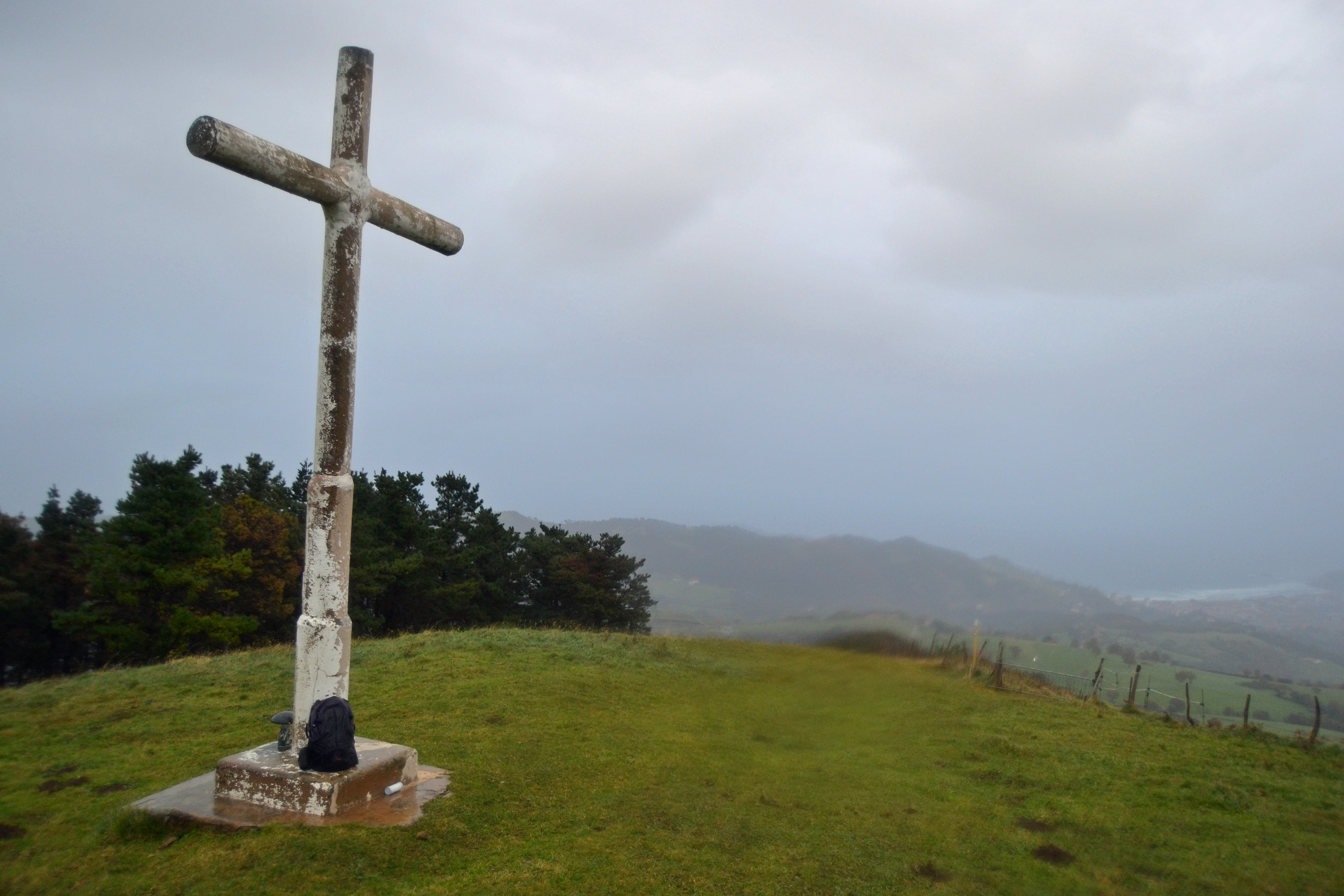
Guipúzcoa

Olazábal was heading Guipuzcoan Carlism between 1887 and 1908, during the period of dramatic social, economic and political change in the province. Some authors claim that his leadership style had enormous impact on Basque Carlism and contributed to final fate of the movement in the Vascongadas. Though he resided outside the province, Olazábal tended to run the Carlist provincial affairs single-handedly. In theory, he should have been assisted by Junta Provincial; though formally created in 1889, Olazábal has never assembled this body. When de Cerralbo strove to build in-depth party structures nationwide, Guipúzcoa was one of the least-dynamic provinces; the number of local juntas grew from 59 in 1892 to 87 in 1896, mere 47% growth rate compared to 63% of Biscay and 257% of Álava. In 1899 there were fewer juntas in Guipúzcoa than in the Alicante province, hardly known for its Traditionalist zeal. Olazábal did not appreciate modern means of political mobilisation introduced by de Cerralbo, commenting that his pompous trips across the country served no purpose but arrests of Carlist supporters.

Olazábal's position versus rebellious Guipuzcoan Carlist branches was somewhat ambiguous. On the one hand, he was adamant ensuring full loyalty to the king and expulsing either those suspected of siding with rebellious Nocedal in 1888–1889 or evicting Victor Pradera and his collaborators in 1910. On the other hand, he was rather flexible as to forging electoral alliances with the Integrists; it was the Guipuzcoan 1898 accord which ended the decade of hostility and inspired collaboration also in other provinces. In terms of political strength measured by the number of Cortes mandates won, during Olazábal's tenure Guipúzcoa (9 mandates) was second only to Navarre (28); measured as ratio between seats won and seats available Guipuzcoan Carlists achieved a 20% success ratio, compared to 44% in Navarre and 19% in Álava. By all means the province remained the Carlist national stronghold.

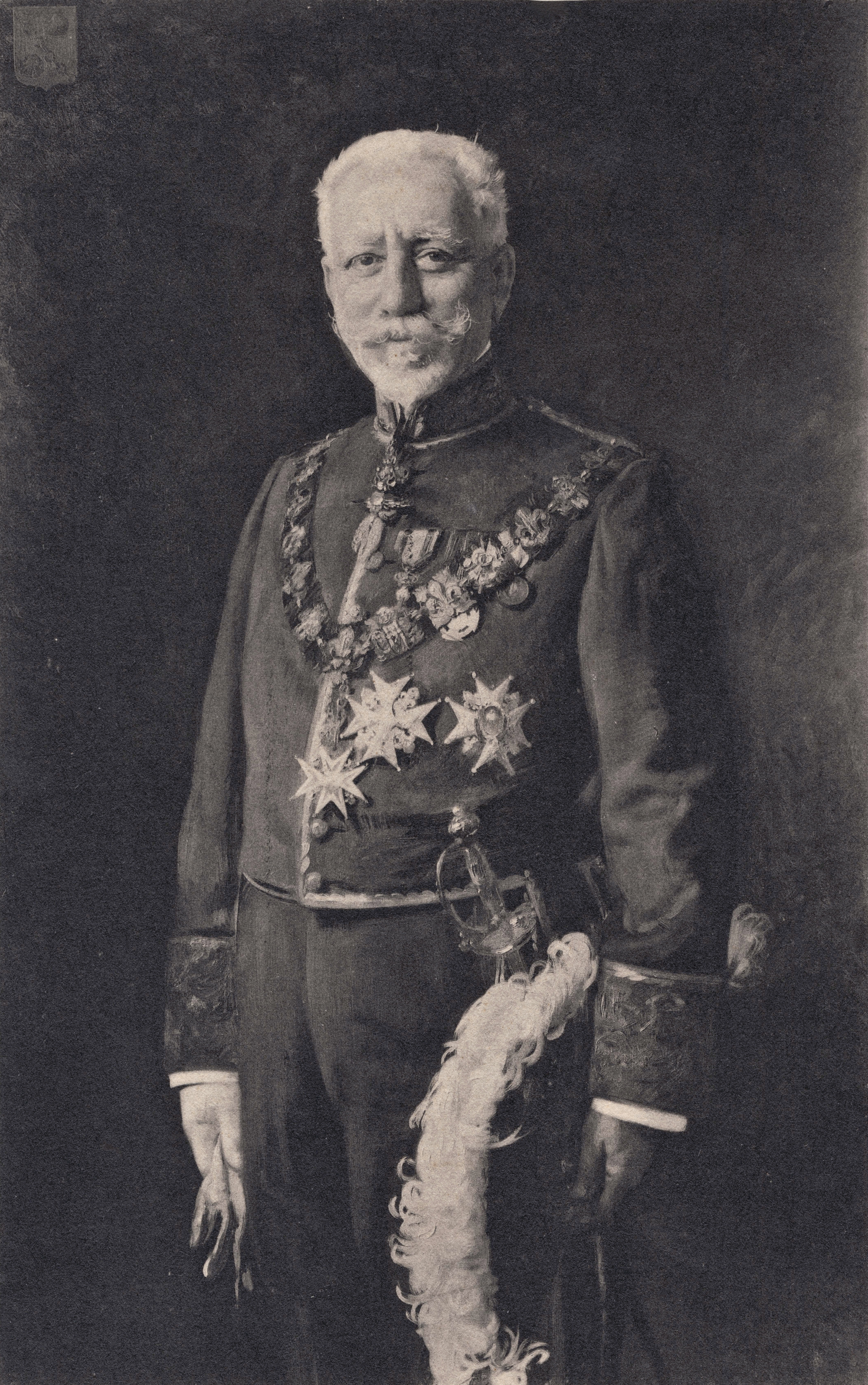
Olazábal with Golden Fleece, 1910

Though Olazábal commenced his political activity under the “Dios y fueros” banner and though he protested to Carlist leaders against breaking with the foral tradition, he is not recognised as particularly concerned with regional rights. Some of his contemporaries described him as “aforal” (though not “antiforal”). Present-day scholar claims that until the early 1880s Guipuzcoan Carlism was offering a clear Catholic and foral line. Later on, mostly due to stance of provincial leaders, the movement stalled in "political ossification", with "tradicionalismo foralista" replaced—thanks to influence of de Mella and Pradera—by "doctrina españolista"; This resulted in Carlism failing to accommodate or to offer an alternative to the nascent Basque national movement. Though Olazábal was related to José Ignacio Arana, he probably failed to understand what process was at work when Daniel Irujo handed his resignation in 1908. He had even less understanding of the Basque workers’ movement, which he firmly opposed like during the 1912 gathering in Eibar, ending in riots.

== In literature ==
Tirso de Olazábal appears in the Fifth Series (Spain Without a King) of Benito Pérez Galdós's Episodios Nacionales.

It is also possible that Olazábal has also been acknowledged in world literature; the 1919 novel of Joseph Conrad, The Arrow of Gold, features a person referred to as "Lord X", whose activities as arms smuggler resemble those of Olazábal.

== Issue ==
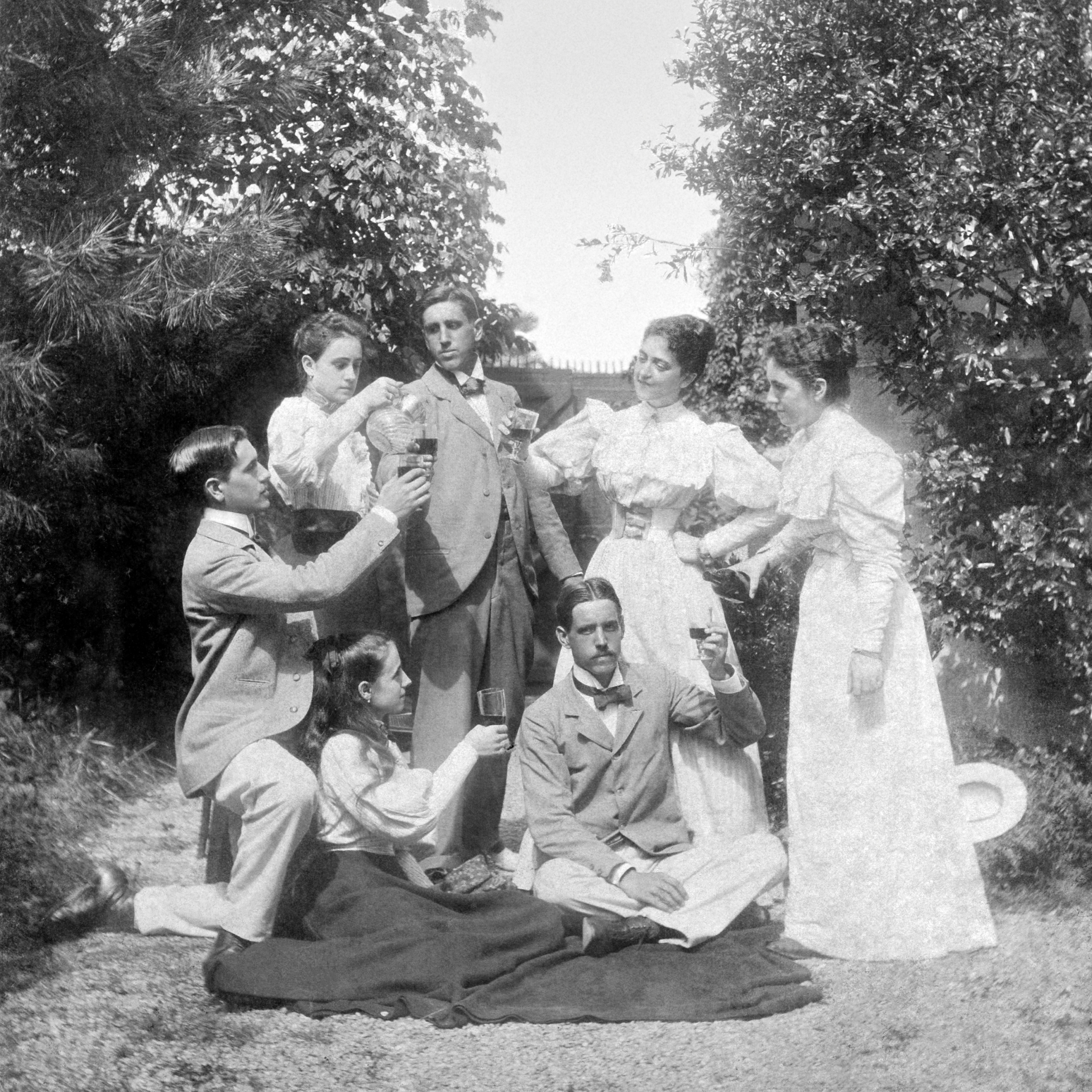
The family of Tirso de Olazábal. From left to right: Ramón; Vicenta (later Countess of Urquijo); Tirso; Francesca (Cichetta) Zileri dal Verme degli Obbizi (later Countess Emo Capodilista); Mercedes. From left to right, seated: Lorenza and José Joaquín. Saint-Jean-de-Luz, France, 1890s.

Tirso married Ramona Álvarez de Eulate y Moreda, from a noble lineage related mostly to Guipúzcoa and Navarre, in 1867. They had twelve children, eleven of whom survived infancy:

- Mercedes de Olazábal y Álvarez de Eulate, who died unmarried
- Margarita de Olazábal y Álvarez de Eulate, who died unmarried
- Ramón de Olazábal y Álvarez de Eulate, married in 1899 to Maria Luísa de Mendóça Rolim de Moura Barreto, daughter of Augusto Pedro de Mendóça Rolim de Moura Barreto, 3rd Count of Azambuja, and his wife, the Portuguese heiress Maria da Assunção Ferreira. They had six sons and four daughters.
- José Joaquín de Olazábal y Álvarez de Eulate
- Tirso de Olazábal y Álvarez de Eulate, married in 1916 to María de la Concepción de Jaraquemada y Quiñones, daughter of Mateo Jaraquemada y Cabeza de Vaca, Marquis of Jaraquemada, and his wife, María Amparo de Quiñones y Gómez-Jara, 13th Marquise of Lorenzana. The couple had no children.
- Vicenta de Olazábal y Álvarez de Eulate, married in 1894 to Julio de Urquijo e Ibarra, Count of Urquijo. The couple had no children.
- Lorenza de Olazábal y Álvarez de Eulate, a Handmaid of the Sacred Heart of Jesus.
- Blanca de Olazábal y Álvarez de Eulate, a Handmaid of the Sacred Heart of Jesus.
- Rafael de Olazábal y Álvarez de Eulate, married to Ana Yohn y Zayas, daughter of Victoriano José Yohn y Urigüen and his wife, Maximina Casilda de Zayas y Celis. They had four sons and four daughters.
- Ignacio de Olazábal y Álvarez de Eulate, married in 1918 to the Chilean heiress Ana Vives y Rámila. They had a daughter.
- Pelayo de Olazábal y Álvarez de Eulate, married in 1928 to María Isabel Ruiz de Arana y Fontagud, 12th countess of Cantillana, daughter of Vicente Pio Ruiz de Arana y Osorio de Moscoso, 11th marquess of Castromonte, 21st count of Priego, Grandee of Spain, and his wife, Elena María Luisa Bertrán de Fontagud y Aguilera. They had two sons and five daughters.
- Roberto de Olazábal y Álvarez de Eulate, who died as a child

== See also ==
- Carlism
- Third Carlist War
- Carlos VII
- Jaime III
- Electoral Carlism (Restoration)
- Enrique de Aguilera y Gamboa
- Julio de Urquijo e Ibarra
- Mellismo
- Villa Arbelaiz
