= Étienne Audibert =

French engineer

- Born: May 14, 1888; Marseille
- Died: June 6, 1954 (aged 66); Paris
- Education: École polytechnique École nationale supérieure des mines de Paris
- Occupations: Engineer, politician, industrialist
- Known for: chairman of Électricité de France (1947–1949); Mayor of Senlis (1941–); Vice President of the Conseil général des mines
- Awards: Resistance Medal; Melchett Medal (1940); Grand Officer of the Legion of Honour

Etienne Audibert (May 14, 1888 – June 6, 1954) was a French engineer, a Mayor of Senlis, a Vice President of Conseil général des mines, the second chairman of Électricité de France (EDF) from 1947 to 1949, a Chair of Charbonnages de France, and a directeur général of CERCHAR.

== Career ==
Audibert was a student of the Christian school in Mées and then at the l'Institution Sainte-Geneviève in Versailles.

In 1907, Audibert began studies at the École polytechnique and was ranked 6th in his class of 170 students during the admissions process.

In January 1941, Audibert became the Mayor of the town of Senlis.

Audibert was arrested by the Sicherheitsdienst on June 7, 1944, and transported to the Neuengamme concentration camp. He returned to France on May 18, 1945.

== Awards ==
- Knight of the Legion of Honour (June 30, 1925)
- Officer of the Legion of Honour (December 31, 1938)
- Commander of the Legion of Honour (October 16, 1946)
- Grand Officer of the Legion of Honour (December 14, 1949)
- Resistance Medal

He was awarded the Melchett Medal from the Energy Institute in 1940.

On January 18, 1951, the medal of the British Institute of Mining Engineers was awarded to Audibert for the year 1950, in recognition of his contributions to the mining industry. Audibert was the second person from France to receive this distinction.

== Publications ==
- Étienne Audibert (January 1, 1924). "Étude expérimentale de la combustion du charbon pulvérisé". Revue de l'industrie minérale (73).
- Étienne Audibert (1943). "Le mécanisme de l'oxydation du méthane". Annales des mines et des carburants.
- Étienne Audibert (January 1947). "Le mécanisme des réactions en chaînes et de la combustion du méthane". Annales des mines et des carburants.
- Étienne Audibert (January 1947). "Le tir en atmosphère grisouteuse". Annales des mines et des carburants.
- Étienne Audibert; André Raineau (January 1947). "L'utilisation du mixte de lavage". Annales des mines et des carburants.
- Étienne Audibert; André Raineau (January 1947). "L'effet des tourbillons sur la stratification du lit de lavage". Annales des mines et des carburants.
