= Walt Patterson =

Canadian writer and environmentalist

Walter C Patterson (born November 4, 1936) is a UK-based Canadian physicist and widely published writer and campaigner on energy.

== Biography ==
Patterson was born in Winnipeg, Manitoba, Canada, and educated at the University of Manitoba. Patterson arrived in the United Kingdom in 1960. Trained as a nuclear physicist, Patterson has spent his life teaching, writing and campaigning. In 1972, he became Friends of the Earth's first energy campaigner (1972–1978) at their London office. In 1984–1985, Patterson acted as series advisor to the BBC drama series Edge of Darkness.

Patterson has published fourteen books and hundreds of papers, articles and reviews, on nuclear power, coal technology, renewable energy, energy systems, energy policy, and electricity. His most recent book, self-published online in April 2015, is Electricity Vs Fire: The Fight For Our Future. It argues that a key cause of global problems is human use of fire - polluting city air worldwide, creating international tension about fuel to feed fire, and overheating the planet. To reduce the damage will entail using less fire, especially by improving buildings and by accelerating the shift from fire-based to fire-free electricity.

Since 1991, Patterson has been a Fellow of what is now the Energy, Environment and Resources Programme at Chatham House in London. He is a Fellow of the Energy Institute, London, and a Visiting Fellow of the Science Policy Research Unit at the University of Sussex. He is chair of the Seoul International Energy Advisory Council and a founder-member of the International Energy Advisory Council.

== Awards ==
In 2000, the Institute of Energy, now the Energy Institute, awarded Patterson its annual Melchett Medal.

In 2004, Scientific American honoured Patterson as Energy Policy Leader for his work in pioneering the concept of distributed micropower generation.

== Books ==
- Red Alert - Nuclear Reactors (Earth Island Ltd 1973)
- Nuclear Power (Penguin 1976-86)
- The Fissile Society: Energy, Electricity and the Nuclear Option (Earth Resources Research 1977)
- The Plutonium Business and the Spread of the Bomb (Paladin 1984)
- Going Critical: An Unofficial History of British Nuclear Power (Paladin 1985)
- The Energy Alternative: Changing The Way The World Works (Boxtree 1990)
- Rebuilding Romania: Energy, Efficiency and the Economic Transition (Earthscan 1994)
- Power from Plants: Global Implications of New Technologies for Electricity from Biomass (Earthscan 1994)
- Transforming Electricity: The Coming Generation of Change (Earthscan 1999) (Chinese edition)
- Keeping the Lights On (Earthscan 2007)
- Electricity Vs Fire: The Fight For Our Future (2015)
- Reframing Urban Energy Policy: Challenges and Opportunities in the City Seoul preface (Seoul Metropolitan Government 2017) ISBN 979-11-6161-057-3
